= British passport =

Passport issued to British nationals

British passport; Welsh: Pasbort Prydeinig; Irish: Pas Briotanach; Scottish Gaelic: Cead-siubhail Breatannach
- The front cover of a British passport

- Polycarbonate data page of the current Series D British biometric passport
- Type: Passport
- Issued by: United Kingdom — HM Passport Office — CSRO (Gibraltar) —Crown dependencies —Overseas Territories
- First issued: 1414 (First mention of 'passport' in an Act of Parliament) (Note: Safe Conducts Act 1414 (2 Hen. 5 c. 6)); 1915 (Photo passport); 1921 (Hardcover booklet); 15 August 1988 (Machine-readable passport); 5 October 1998 (Version 2); 6 March 2006 (Series A biometric passport); 5 October 2010 (Version 2); 7 December 2015 (Series B); 10 March 2020 (Series C); 31 December 2025 (Series D)
- In circulation: 53.4 million (2025)
- Purpose: Identification, international travel
- Valid in: For most passport types, all countries; British National (Overseas) passports not recognised in People's Republic of China, Hong Kong and Macao
- Eligibility: British nationals
- Expiration: Adult: 10 years Child: 5 years
- Cost: Adult (16 or older) (Note: Free if born before 2 September 1929) (Note: Upgrade fees may still apply.) (Note: This differs from the UK age of majority at which a person reaches adulthood, which is 18.); Standard (34 pages): £102; Frequent traveller (54 pages): £116 Child (under 16); Standard (34 pages): £66.50; Frequent traveller (54 pages): £80.50; Fees above are only for applications made online from within UK

The British passport is a travel document issued by the United Kingdom or other British dependencies and territories to individuals holding any form of British nationality. It grants the bearer international passage in accordance with visa requirements and serves as proof of British citizenship. It also facilitates access to consular assistance from British embassies around the world. Passports are issued using Royal Prerogative, which is exercised by His Majesty's Government; this means that the grant of a passport is a privilege, not a right, and may be withdrawn in some circumstances. British citizen passports have been issued in the UK by His Majesty's Passport Office, an agency of the Home Office, since 2014. All passports issued in the UK since 2006 have been biometric.

The legacy of the United Kingdom as an imperial power has resulted in several types of British nationality, and different types of British passport exist as a result. Furthermore, each of the Crown dependencies and certain Overseas territories issue their own variants of British passports to those with links to their jurisdictions, which have small differences from the UK-variant passport. All British passports enable the bearer to request consular assistance from British Embassies and from certain Commonwealth High Commissions in some cases. British citizens can use their passport as evidence of right of abode in the United Kingdom.

Between 1920 and 1992, the standard design of British passports was a navy blue hardcover booklet featuring the Royal achievement of arms emblazoned in gold. From 1988, the UK adopted machine readable passports in accordance with the International Civil Aviation Organization standard 9303. At this time, the passport colour was also changed to burgundy red, to bring it into line with the European Community passports of other member states. The previous blue hardback passport continued to be issued in tandem with the new design until stocks were exhausted in 1992.

Pre-Brexit, the contract for printing British passports had been held by British company De La Rue on a 10-year contract since 2010, and prior to that by 3M. In 2018, the contract for printing post-Brexit was awarded to Franco-Dutch company Gemalto, which in 2019 became Thales DIS, part of the multinational Thales Group. The passport booklets would be printed more cheaply in Poland, with a controversial loss of printer jobs at De La Rue, but the passports would be personalised in the UK across two sites. All passports are now issued with the blue design and they are made by Thales DIS in Poland.

British citizens have visa-free or visa on arrival access to 184 countries and territories; the international access available to British citizens ranks eighth in the world according to the 2025 Visa Restrictions Index. British citizens have freedom of movement in the Republic of Ireland, due to the Common Travel Area. Since the introduction of biometric passports in 2006, a new design has been introduced every five years. As of 2025 there were 53.4 million British passports in circulation.

== History ==
Timeline
Various changes to the design were made over the years:
- 1914: the first 'modern' passports featuring a photograph of the holder were issued.
- 1915: passports featuring a cardboard cover, validity period, and description of the holder were first issued.
- 1927: the country name changed from "United Kingdom of Great Britain and Ireland" to "United Kingdom of Great Britain and Northern Ireland" (alternatively the name of the colony, territory, or protectorate appeared here).
- 1954: the name of the Secretary of State was removed.
- 1968: the validity was extended from five years renewable up to ten, to ten years non-renewable.
- 1972, end: several modifications were made. A special blue watermarked paper was introduced to make alteration and forgery more difficult. The number of pages was reduced from 32 to 30, and the holder's eye colour and the maiden name of a married woman were removed.
- 1973, May: an optional 94-page passport was made available which provided many more pages for immigration stamps and visas for frequent travellers.
- 1975: lamination over the bearer's photograph was introduced to make alteration harder. Overprinting of the laminate was added in 1981 to make removal easier to spot.
- 1979: Sterling area exchange controls were abolished, and the foreign exchange page was removed.
- 1982: the holder's occupation and country of residence were removed.
- 1988, July: changes were made to ease the introduction of machine-readable passports later in the year. Joint passports were no longer issued and the descriptions of distinguishing features and height were removed. At the same time the number of pages was increased to 32 pages in a standard passport, whilst the jumbo passport was reduced to 48 pages.
- 1988, August: the old style started to be replaced by the burgundy passport, which included the first-ever printed mention of the European Community on the cover and granted automatic free movement of labour to British citizens in the other 9 EEC countries (at the time), and reciprocally provided access for those nation's workers into the British economy. Some offices issued the remaining stock of old-style passports until as late as 1993.
- 1998: Digital facial image rather than a laminated photograph, and intaglio or raised printing on the inside of the covers. Children under 16 are no longer included on new adult passports.
- 2006: Biometric passports (also called ePassports) comply with the US Visa Waiver Program.
- 2010: The Identity & Passport Service announced that the British passport was to be redesigned. Pages of the passport will contain well-known British scenes including the White Cliffs of Dover, the Gower Peninsula, Ben Nevis and the Giant's Causeway. There will also be new security features, namely moving the chip which stores the holder's details to the inside of the passport cover where it will no longer be visible (this gives additional physical protection as well as making it much harder to replace the chip without damage to the passport cover being spotted), a secondary image of the holder printed onto the observations page, new designs now stretching across two pages and a new transparent covering which includes several holograms to protect the holder's personal details.
- 2015: HM Passport Office unveiled the design and theme of the new passport as 'Creative United Kingdom' at Shakespeare's Globe, London on November. The design features British cultural icons such as William Shakespeare, John Harrison, John Constable, Charles Babbage, Ada Lovelace, Antony Gormley, Elisabeth Scott and Anish Kapoor; iconic British innovations such as the Penny Black and the London Underground; and British landmark structures like the Houses of Parliament, London Eye, Edinburgh Castle, the Pierhead Building in Cardiff, Titanic Belfast and the Royal Observatory Greenwich. As part of the Press release the HM Passport Office said the new passport is the most secure in the world. The passport was released in December 2015. De La Rue has a 10-year contract with HM Passport Office designing and producing the British Passports starting in 2010 as well as the new 'Creative UK' passport in 2015.
- 2019: References to the European Union removed.
- 2020: Burgundy passports to be phased out over the first few months. New manufacturer Gemalto to start issuing navy blue passports, which are printed at the plant in Tczew (Poland). These new passports are said to be the most technologically advanced in the world and add features such as a polycarbonate data page and the holder's data duplicated on an electronic microprocessor. The Home Office is also aiming for the new passports to be carbon net-neutral, through projects such as tree planting to offset carbon emissions during the manufacturing process.

=== Early passports (1414–1921) ===
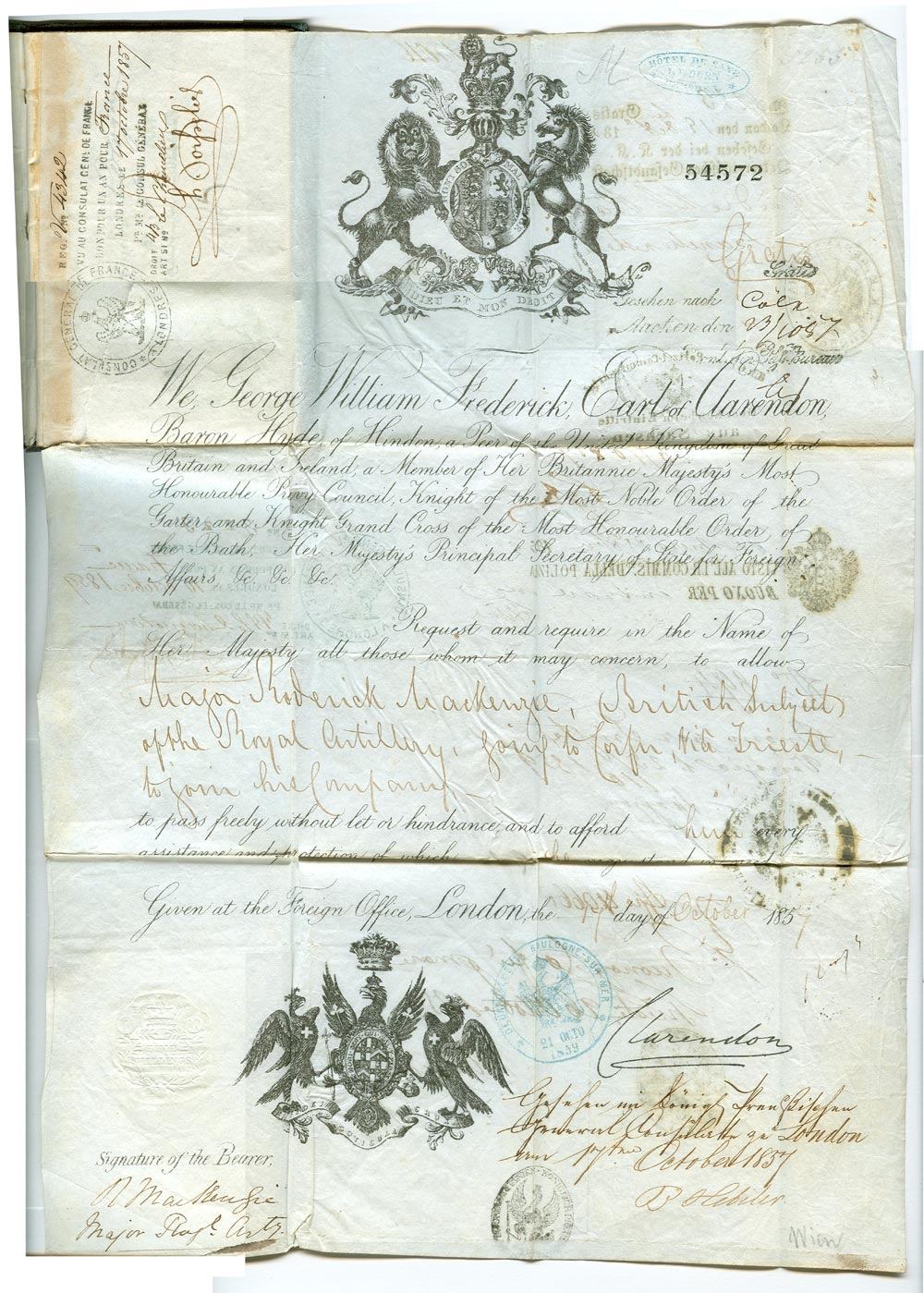
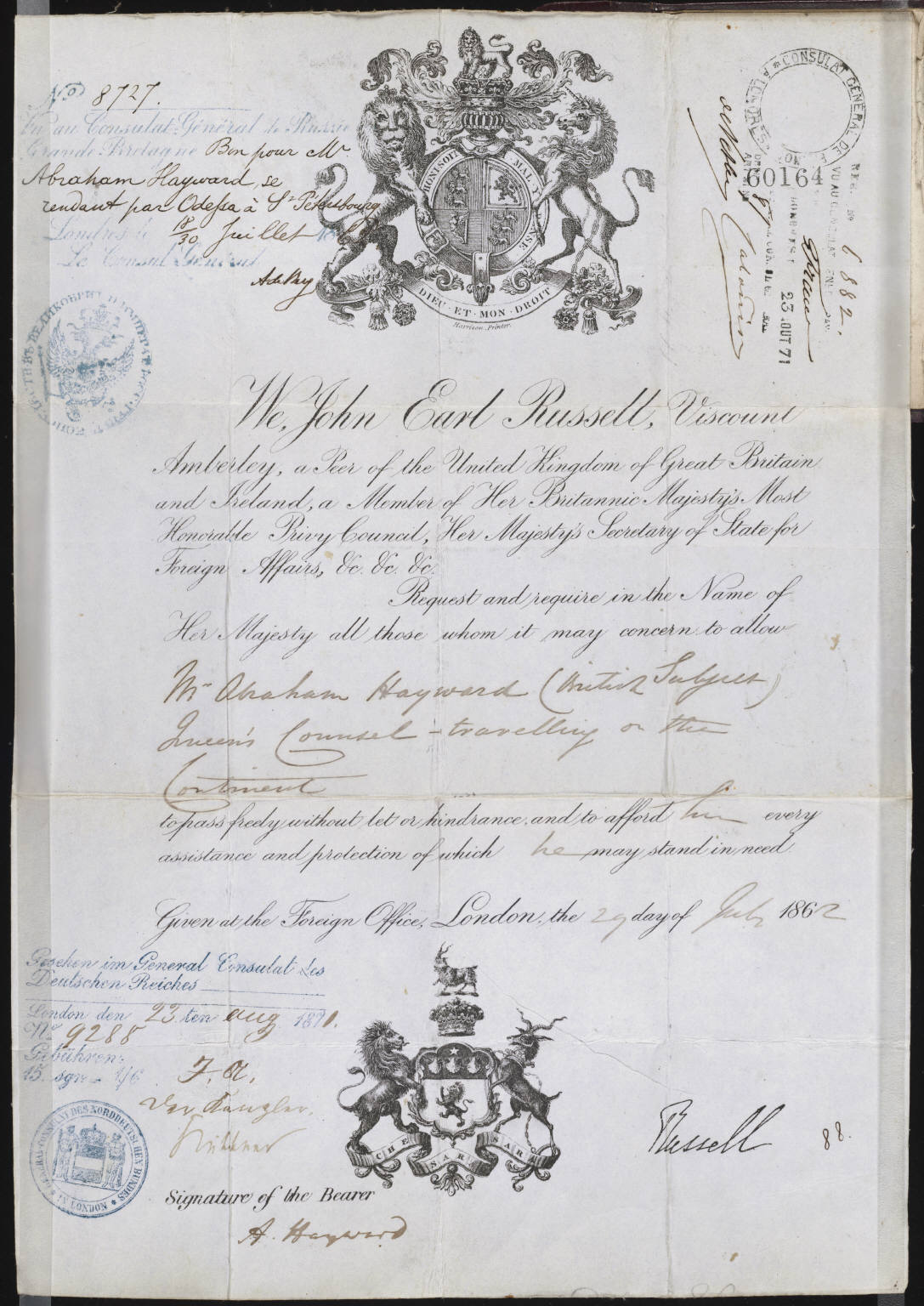
British passports issued in 1857 (left) and 1862 (right).

King Henry V of England is credited with having invented what some consider the first passport in the modern sense, as a means of helping his subjects prove who they were in foreign lands. The earliest reference to these documents is found in the Safe Conducts Act 1414. In 1540, granting travel documents in England became a role of the Privy Council of England, and it was around this time that the term "passport" was introduced. In Scotland, passports were issued by the Scottish Crown and could also be issued on the Crown's behalf by burghs, Lord Provosts of Edinburgh and Glasgow, senior churchmen and noblemen. Passports were still signed by the monarch until 1685, when the Secretary of State could sign them instead. The Secretary of State signed all passports in place of the monarch from 1794 onwards, at which time formal records started to be kept; all of these records still exist. Passports were written in Latin or English until 1772, then in French until 1858. Since that time, they have been written in English, with some sections translated into French. In 1855, passports became a standardised document issued solely to British nationals. Passports in England and Wales were issued by the Home Secretary, and in Scotland by the Lord Provost of Edinburgh or Glasgow. They were a simple single-sheet hand-drafted paper document.

Some duplicate passports and passport records are available at the British Library; for example IOR: L/P&J/11 contain a few surviving passports of travelling ayahs from the 1930s. A passport issued on 18 June 1641 and signed by King Charles I still exists.

Starting in the late 19th century, an increasing number of Britons began travelling abroad due to the advent of railways and travel services such as the Thomas Cook Continental Timetable. The speed of trains, as well as the number of passengers that crossed multiple borders, made enforcement of passport laws difficult, and many travellers did not carry a passport in this era. However, the outbreak of World War I led to the introduction of modern border controls, including in the UK with passage of the British Nationality and Status of Aliens Act 1914. Thus, in 1915 the British government developed a new format of passport that could be mass-produced and used to quickly identify the bearer. The new passport consisted of a printed sheet folded into ten and affixed to a clothed cardboard cover. It included a description of the holder as well as a photograph, and had to be renewed after two years.

=== Passport booklets (1921–1993) ===
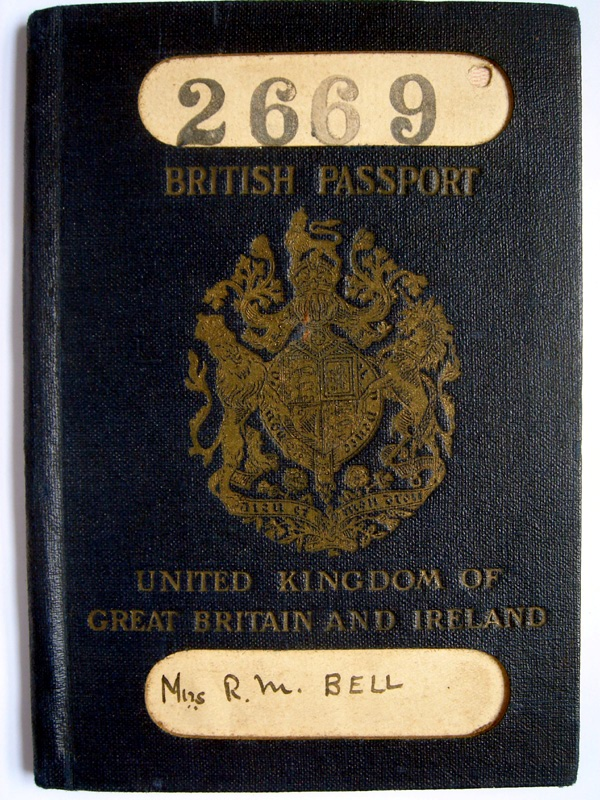
British passport issued in 1924

In October 1920, the League of Nations held the Paris Conference on Passports & Customs Formalities and Through Tickets. British diplomats joined with 42 countries to draft passport guidelines and a general booklet design resulted from the conference. The League model specified a 32-page booklet of 15.5 by 10.5 cm (6.1 by 4.1 in). The first four pages were reserved for detailing the bearer's physical characteristics, occupation and residence.

The British government formed the Passport Office in the same year and in 1921 began issuing 32-page passports with a navy blue hardcover bearing the Royal achievement of arms. "BRITISH PASSPORT" was the common identifier printed at the top of all booklets, while the name of the issuing government was printed below the achievement of arms (e.g. United Kingdom, New Zealand, Hong Kong). Cut-outs in the cover allowed the bearer's name and the passport number to be displayed. This format would remain the standard for most British passports until the introduction of machine-readable passports in 1988. It continued to be issued in the United Kingdom until the end of 1993.

As with many contemporary travel documents worldwide, details were handwritten into the passport and (as of 1955) included: number, holder's name, "accompanied by his wife" and her maiden name, "and" (number) "children", national status. For both bearer and wife: profession, place and date of birth, country of residence, height, eye and hair colour, special peculiarities, signature and photograph. Names, birth dates, and sexes of children, list of countries for which valid, issue place and date, expiry date, a page for renewals and, at the back, details of the amount of foreign exchange for travel expenses (a limited amount of sterling, typically £50 but increasing with inflation, could be taken out of the country). The bearer's sex was not explicitly stated, although the name was written in with title ("Mr John Smith"). Descriptive text was printed in both English and French (a practice which still continues), e.g., "Accompanied by his wife (Maiden name)/Accompagné de sa femme (Née)". Changed details were struck out and rewritten, with a rubber-stamped note confirming the change.

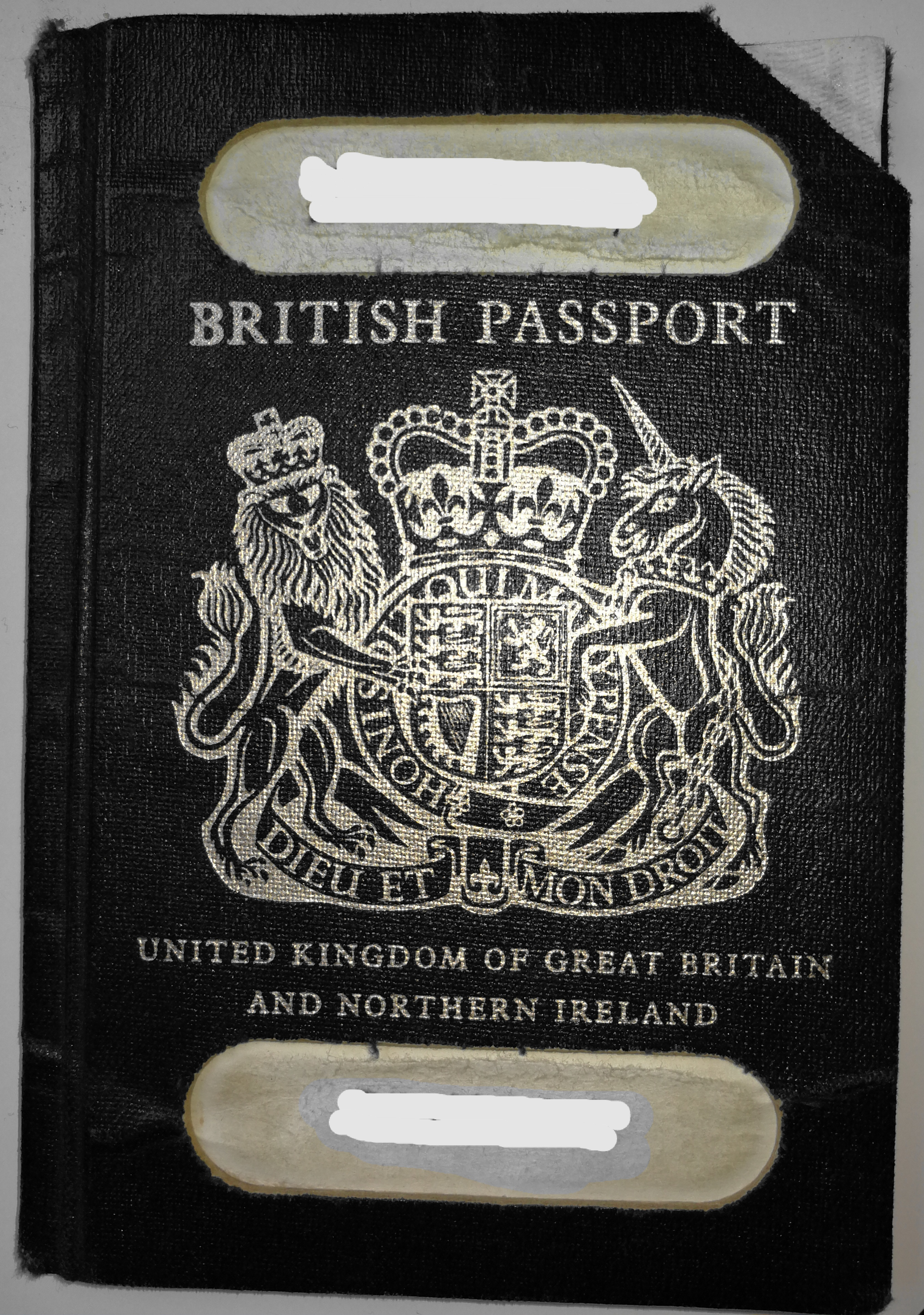
British passport issued in 1991 prior to the complete changeover to machine-readable European Community passports

If details and photograph of a man's wife and details of children were entered (this was not compulsory), the passport could be used by the bearer, wife, and children under 16, if together; separate passports were required for the wife or children to travel independently. Until 1972 the passport was valid for five years, renewable for another five, after which it had to be replaced.

Renewal of a passport required physical cancellation of the old passport, which was then returned to the bearer. The top-right corner of its front cover was cut off and "Cancelled" was stamped into one or both of the cut-outs in the front cover, which showed the passport number and the bearer's name, as well on the pages showing the bearer's details and the document's validity.

For much of the 20th century, the passport had a printed list of countries for which it was valid, which was added to manually as validity increased. A passport issued in 1955 was valid for the British Commonwealth, USA, and all countries in Europe "including the USSR, Turkey, Algeria, Azores, Canary Islands, Iceland, and Madeira"; during its period of validity restrictions eased and it was endorsed "and for all other foreign countries".

==== The British Visitor's Passport ====
A new simplified type, the British Visitor's Passport, was introduced in 1961. It was a single sheet of card, folded in three so as to consist of six pages the same size as those of a regular passport. It was valid for one year and originally was priced 7/6 (seven shillings and sixpence = 37½ new pence decimal currency equivalent). It was obtainable for many years from Employment Exchanges, as agents of the Passport Office, and later from a Crown Post Office. It was accepted for travel by most West European countries (excluding surface travel to West Berlin), but was dropped in 1995 since it did not meet new security standards. A cancelled passport, which was returned to the bearer, had its top-right corner cut off, which had the effect of removing a corner from every page.

=== Machine-readable passports (1988–2006) ===
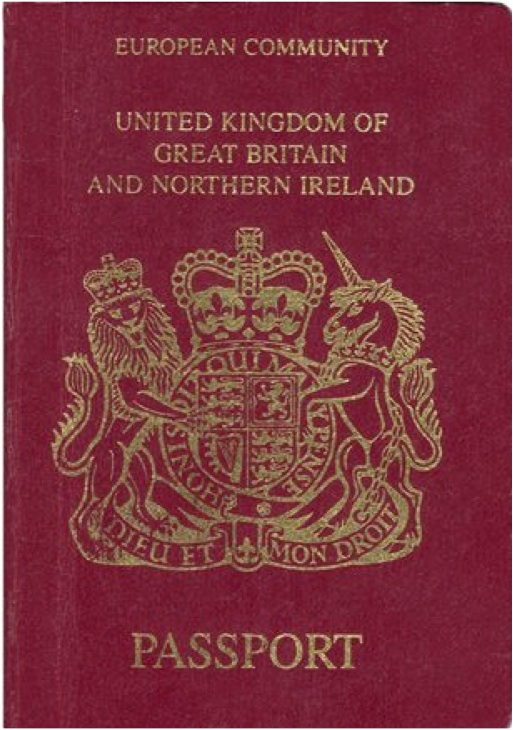
European Community passport as introduced in 1988 before the Community became the European Union

After the passport standardisation efforts of the 1920s, further effort to update international passport guidance was limited. The United Kingdom joined the European Communities in 1973, at a time when the Communities was looking to strengthen European civic identity. Between 1974 and 1975, the member states developed a common format. Member states agreed that passports should be burgundy in colour and feature the heading "European Community" in addition to the country name. Adoption by member states was voluntary. While most of the Community adopted the format by 1985, the UK continued to issue the traditional blue booklet.

Rapid growth of air travel and technological change led to the International Civil Aviation Organization defining a new international standard for machine-readable passport, ICAO Doc 9303, in 1980. An ICAO standard machine-readable passport was a significant departure from the traditional British passport layout, and the British government did not immediately adopt it. In 1986, the United States announced the US Visa Waiver Program. The concept allowed for passport holders of certain countries to enter the US for business or tourism without applying for a visitor visa. The UK was the first country to join the scheme in 1988; however, a requirement was that the traveller hold a machine-readable passport. Thus, the British government, after nearly 70 years, decided to retire the traditional League of Nations format passport.

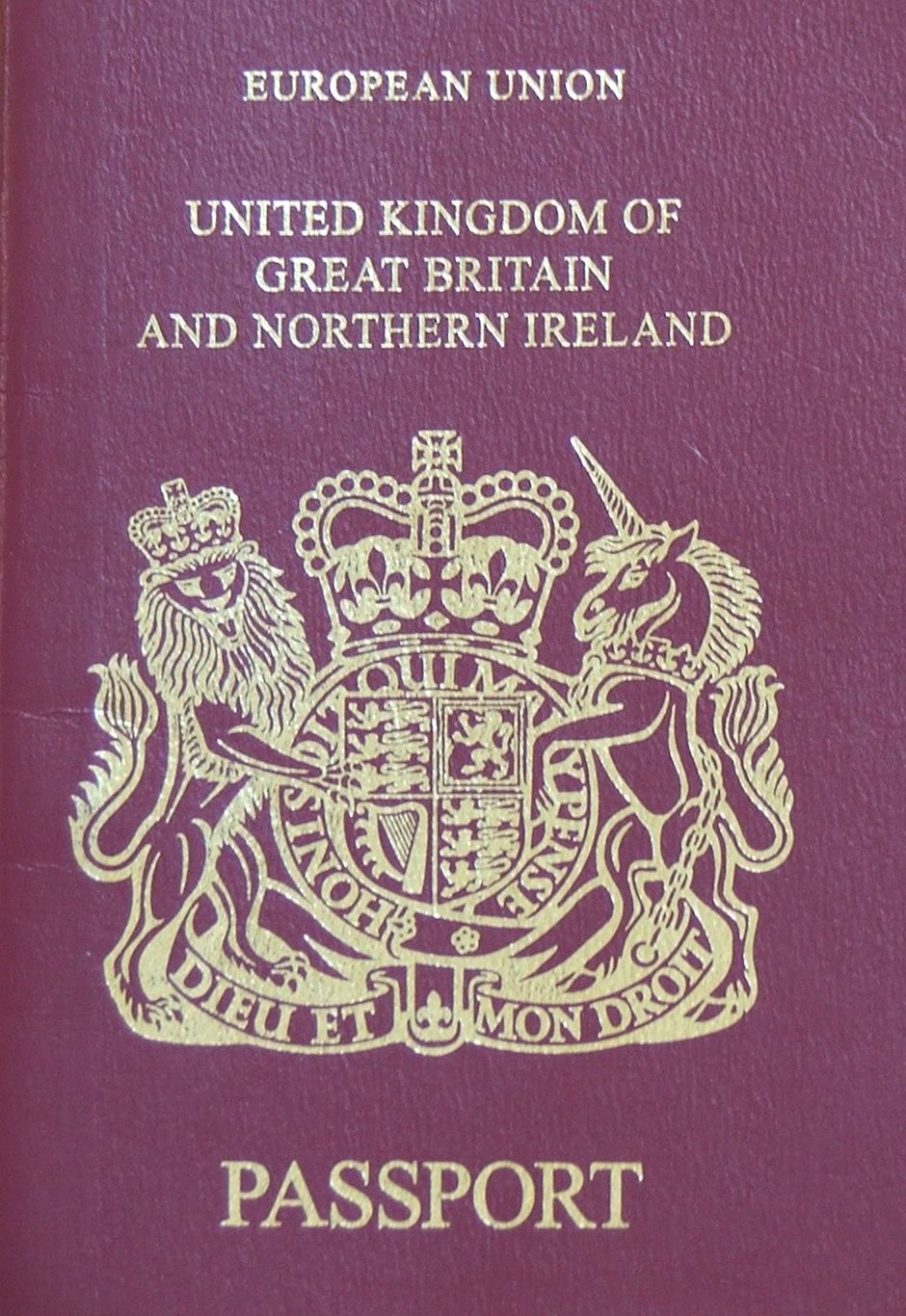
Non-biometric European Union passport issued after 1997

With the move to machine-readable passports, the UK decided to adopt the European Community format. On 15 August 1988, the Glasgow passport office became the first to issue burgundy-coloured machine-readable passports. They had the words 'European Community' on the cover, later changed to 'European Union' in 1997. The passport had 32 pages; while a 48-page version was made available with more space for stamps and visas. Two lines of machine-readable text were printed in ICAO format, and a section was included in which relevant terms ("surname", "date of issue", etc.) were translated into the official EU languages. Passports issued overseas did not all have a Machine Readable Zone, but these were introduced gradually as appropriate equipment was made available overseas.

While other British territories such as Hong Kong and the Cayman Islands were not part of the European Community, they also adopted the same European format, although "British Passport" remained at the top rather than "European Community".

In 1998 the first digital image passport was introduced with photographs being replaced with images printed directly on the data page which was moved from the cover to an inside page to reduce the ease of fraud. These documents were all issued with machine-readable zones and had a hologram over the photograph, which was the first time that British passports had been protected by an optically variable safeguard. These documents were issued until 2006 when the biometric passport was introduced.

=== Biometric passports (2006–present) ===
==== Series A (2006–2015) ====
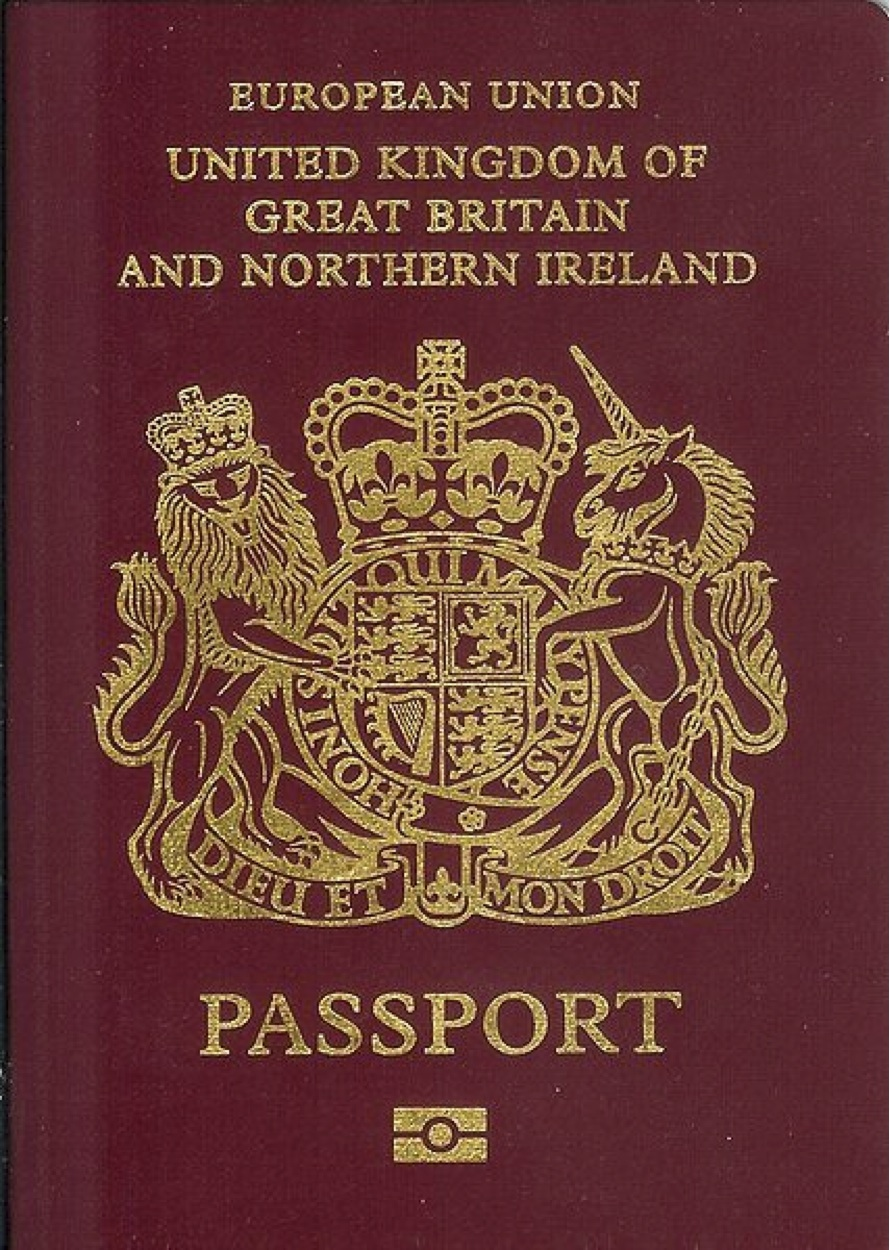
Series A biometric British passport

In the late 1990s, ICAO's Technical Advisory Group began developing a new standard for storing biometric data (e.g. photo, fingerprints, iris scan) on a chip embedded in a passport. The September 11 attacks involving the hijacking of commercial airliners led to the rapid incorporation of the group's technical report into ICAO Doc 9303.

The Identity and Passport Service issued the first biometric British passport on 6 February 2006, known as Series A. This was the first British passport to feature artwork. Series A, version 1 was produced between 2006 and 2010, while an updated version 2 with technical changes and refreshed artwork was produced between 2010 and 2015.

Version 1 showcased birds native to the British Isles. The bio-data page was printed with a finely detailed background including a drawing of a red grouse, and the entire page was protected from modification by a laminate which incorporates a holographic image of the kingfisher; visa pages were numbered and printed with detailed backgrounds including drawings of other birds: a merlin, curlew, pied avocet, and red kite. An RFID chip and antenna were visible on the official observations page and held the same visual information as printed, including a digital copy of the photograph with biometric information for use with facial recognition systems. The Welsh and Scottish Gaelic languages were included in all British passports for the first time, and appeared on the titles page replacing the official languages of the EU, although the EU languages still appeared faintly as part of the background design. Welsh and Scottish Gaelic preceded the official EU languages in the translations section.

In 2010, Her Majesty's Passport Office signed a ten-year, £400 million contract with De La Rue to produce British passports. This resulted in Series A, version 2, which introduced minor security enhancements. The biometric chip was relocated from the official observations page to inside the cover, and the observations page itself was moved from the back of the passport to immediately after the data page. All new art was produced for version 2, this time with a coastal theme. Data and visa pages featured coastal scenes, wildlife and meteorological symbols.

Renewal of the passport required physical cancellation of the old passport, which was then returned to the bearer. The top-right corners of its front and back covers were cut off, as well as the top-right corner of the final pair of pages, which had been bound in plastic with the bearer's details and a digital chip; a white bar-coded form stating "Renewal" and the bearer's personal details was stuck onto the back cover.

==== Series B (2015–2020) ====
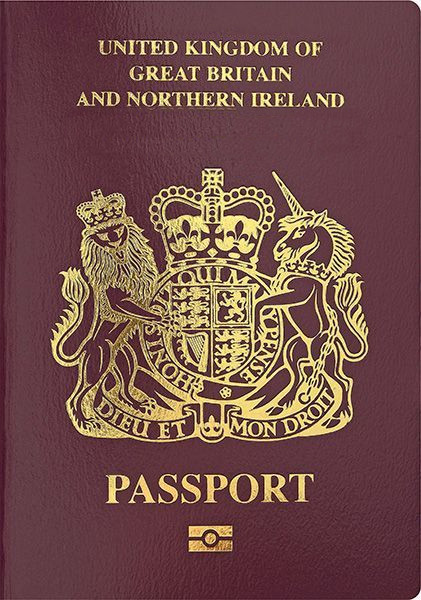
Series B biometric passport issued after March 2019

HMPO's contract with De La Rue involved the design of a new generation of biometric passport, which was released in October 2015 as the Series B passport. The cover design remained the same as Series A, with minor changes to the cover material. The number of pages of a standard passport was increased from 32 to 34, and the 50-page 'jumbo' passport replaced the previous 48-page business passport. New security features included rich three-dimensional UV imagery, cross-page printing and a single-sheet bio-data page joined with the back cover. A new typeface for the cover (Times New Roman) was adopted as well. At the time of its introduction, no other passport offered visa free access to more countries than the UK's Series B British passport.

The theme of the Series B passport was 'Creative United Kingdom', and HMPO described the Series B artwork as the most intricate ever featured in a British passport. Each double-spread page set featured artwork celebrating 500 years of achievements in art, architecture and innovation in the UK. Ordnance Survey maps were also printed inside featuring places related to the imagery. A portrait of William Shakespeare was embedded in each page as a watermark.

The Series B passport was initially issued to British citizens with "European Union" printed on the cover. However, new stocks of the Series B from March 2019 onwards removed the reference in anticipation of withdrawal from the EU. The premature change was controversial given the uncertainty and division in the UK during 2019.

==== Series C (2020–2026) ====
Series C passport issued between 2020 and 2025

The introduction of the burgundy machine-readable passport between 1988 and 1993 had attracted criticism for their perceived flimsiness, mass-produced nature and sudden deviation from the traditional design. There was speculation regarding re-introduction of the old-style passport following the UK's withdrawal from the European Union. but the government denied any immediate plans. Such a change was supported by some due to its symbolic value, including Brexit Secretary David Davis, while others thought the undue weight put on such a trivial change raised the question of whether the government was able to prioritise its order of business ahead of Brexit. Nevertheless, the British passport was due for an update in 2020, as the existing De La Rue passport contract was expiring.

On 2 April 2017, Michael Fabricant MP said that De La Rue had stated that the coat of arms would "contrast better on navy blue than it currently does on the maroon passports" as part of their pre-tender discussions with the government. In December 2017, then Immigration Minister Brandon Lewis announced that the blue passport would "return" after exit from the EU.

Following open tender under EU public procurement rules in 2018, the Franco-Dutch security firm Gemalto was selected over British banknote and travel document printer De La Rue. The result of the tender proved highly controversial, as it saw the production of British passport blanks moved from Gateshead in the UK to Tczew, Poland. Passports are produced in Poland, due to it being more cost efficient, and printed with personal details in the United Kingdom, either at a central printing facility, or, in the case of urgent, fast-tracked or premium-service passports, locally printed at application-processing centres in the UK.

On 10 March 2020, the new Series C blue British passport officially began to be issued. Series B passports would also be issued while the Home Office used up old stock.

On 25 September 2020, HMPO announced all British passports issued would now be blue.

Series C introduces a polycarbonate laser-engraved bio-data page with an embedded RFID chip. Also embedded in the data page is a decoding lens which optically unscrambles information hidden on the official observations page and inner front cover. The reverse of the polycarbonate data page serves as the title page and features a portrait-orientation photo of the bearer, reminiscent of pre-1988 passports. Series C features very little artwork, with a compass rose being the only printed art. The passport has the national flowers of England, Northern Ireland, Scotland and Wales (Tudor Rose, Shamrock, Scotch Thistle and Daffodil, respectively) embossed on the back cover.

On 18 July 2023, the first British passports were issued in the name of King Charles III.

==== Series D (2025–) ====
From December 2025, Series D passports were issued. In addition to updated security features, Series D passports feature the current rendition of the Royal Arms, reflecting the stylistic changes made after the accession of Charles III. Additionally, visa pages feature natural landscapes from across the United Kingdom, including Ben Nevis (Scotland), the Lake District (England), Three Cliffs Bay (Wales), and Giant's Causeway (Northern Ireland).

=== National identity cards ===
==== Second World War ====
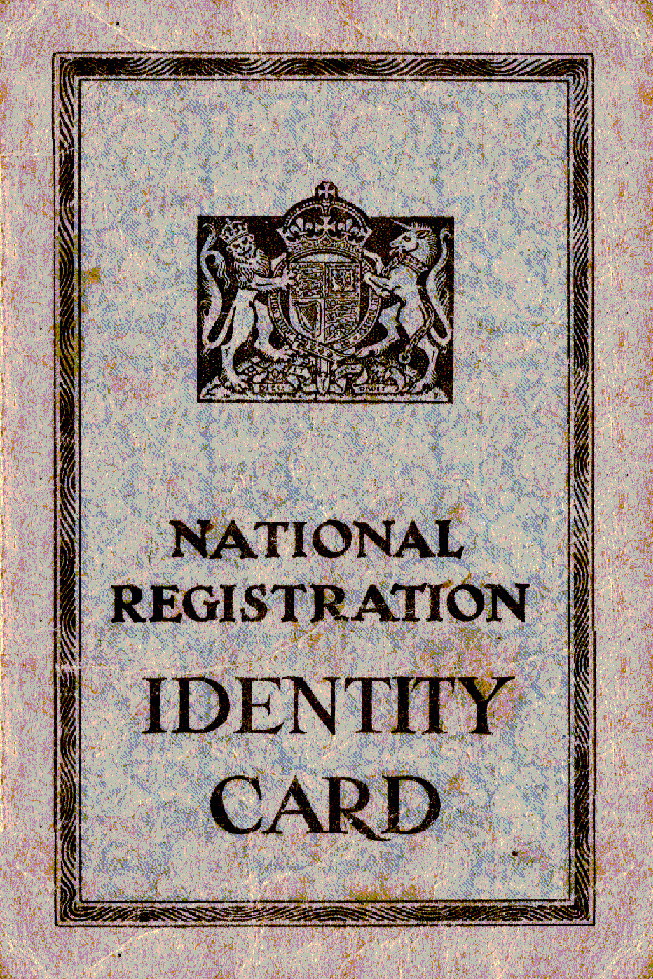
An adult Identity Card – 1943

The National Registration Act established a National Register which began operating on 29 September 1939 (National Registration Day), due to wartime requirements. This introduced a system of identity cards, and an obligation that they must be carried by all persons and produced on demand, or presented to a police station within 48 hours. They included information such as name, age, address, and occupation.

65,000 enumerators across the country delivered forms to householders on the 'National Registration Day', which were required to record their details on. A few days later a completed identity card was issued for each of the residents. All cards at this time were the same brown/buff colour.

Three main reasons for their introduction:

1. The major dislocation of the population caused by mobilisation and mass evacuation and also the wartime need for complete manpower control and planning in order to maximise the efficiency of the war economy.
2. The likelihood of rationing (introduced from January 1940 onwards).
3. Population statistics. As the last census had been held in 1931, there was little accurate data on which to base vital planning decisions. The National Register was in fact an instant census and the National Registration Act closely resembles the 1920 Census Act in many ways

On 21 February 1952, it no longer became necessary to carry an identity card. The National Registration Act of 1939 was repealed on 22 May 1952.

==== 2006 Identity Cards (abandoned) ====
UK National Identity Card. Issued for a brief period in 2009–2010.

The Identity Cards Act 2006 introduced identity cards for UK citizens and residents. They were valid for 10 years and contained a ICAO-standard biometric chip for security. The card was valid to all countries in the European Economic Area (including the European Union) as a travel document, as well as a handful of additional countries that accepted them. A separate green version of the card, not valid as a travel document, was also intended to be issued for resident EU citizens. The identity card scheme was voluntary by law for British citizens.

The Identity and Passport Service linked passport and identity card information to a common database, called the National Identity Register (NIR) and would have required any person applying for a passport or identity card to have their details entered into the NIR. Once registered, they would also have been obliged to update any change to their address and personal details. The identity card was launched in a pilot rollout from 2009 and cost £30. Later, it was envisaged private companies would be able to improve enrolment coverage and charge additional processing fees.

However, the 2010 Conservative – Liberal Democrat Coalition Agreement scrapped the identity card scheme and the NIR. Around 15,000 were issued during their limited availability, until they were discontinued and invalidated in 2011. Nevertheless, biometric passports, a major cost of the scheme, as well as Biometric Residence Permits, continued to be rolled out.

==== Future Implementation ====
In 2025, Labour Together published a report recommending the UK introduce a digital identity card. In 2024, opinion polling showed that the introduction of digital identity cards in the UK held broad public support.

In August 2025, it was reported that the British prime minister, Sir Keir Starmer, was "seriously considering" the introduction of a digital identity system. Subsequently, in September it was announced that the UK would introduce mandatory digital IDs. After the announcement, polls showed that support of mandatory digital ID fell considerably, with 47% of the public against the proposal and 27% in favour. Subsequently, the mandatory element was dropped in January 2026. The incoming Prime Minister Andy Burnham then pledged to scrap the Digital ID project altogether.

=== Five Nations Passport Group ===
Since 2004, the United Kingdom has participated in the Five Nations Passport Group, an international forum for cooperation between the passport issuing authorities in Australia, Canada, New Zealand, and the United States to "share best practices and discuss innovations related to the development of passport policies, products and practices".

== Types of British passports ==
There are many types of British passports, for the different classes of British nationality, variants for certain territories, as well as diplomatic, official, collective and emergency passports. The following table shows the number of valid British passports on the last day of 2025 for each nationality class:

Nationality class	Code	Valid passports on 31 December 2025
British citizens	GBR	53,456,029
British Overseas Territories Citizens	GBD	128,094
British Nationals (Overseas)	GBN	710,369
British subjects with right of abode in UK	GBS	15,925
British subjects without right of abode in UK	GBS	1,965
British Overseas citizens	GBO	9,112
British protected persons	GBP	1,056

=== Common format ===
Common format British passports are issued to British citizens (except those applying in the Crown Dependencies), British Nationals (Overseas), British subjects, British Overseas citizens and British protected persons. They are also issued to British Overseas Territories citizens applying in the UK, in a territory that does not have a local variant, or from abroad. All these passports have the same cover, but the class of British nationality is specified on the personal information page.

All common format British passports are issued by HM Passport Office in the UK. British nationals may apply for a passport online or by post, from any location. From 2011, British diplomatic missions only issue emergency passports.

=== Local variants ===
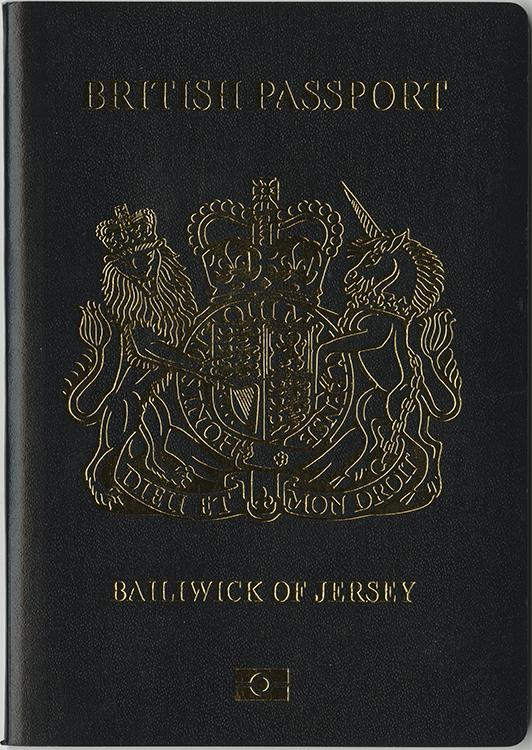
A Series C Jersey-variant British passport

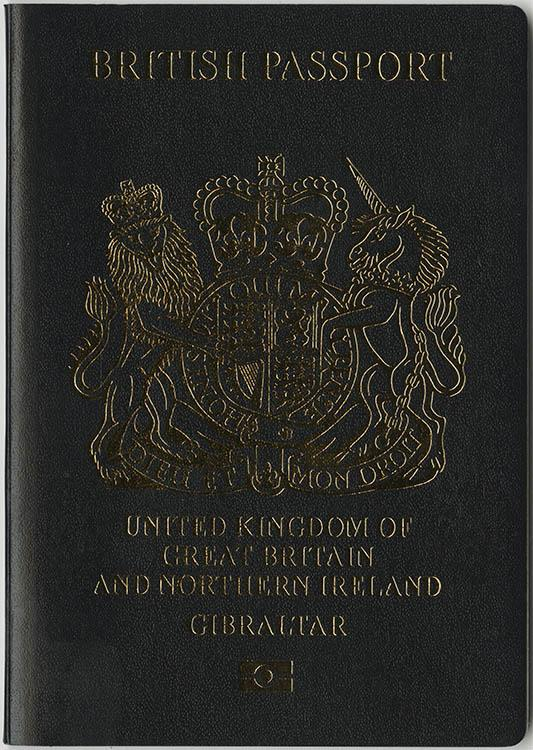
A Series C Gibraltar variant British passport

Local variants of British passports are issued to British citizens in the Crown Dependencies of Guernsey, Isle of Man and Jersey, and to British Overseas Territories citizens (BOTCs) in Anguilla, Bermuda, British Virgin Islands, Cayman Islands, Gibraltar, Montserrat, Saint Helena and Turks and Caicos Islands. These passports display the name of the dependency or territory on the cover, on page 1 and on the personal information page, and the greeting inside their cover is in the name of the appropriate Governor or Lieutenant Governor instead of the British Monarch.

Although variant passports are produced in the UK, applicants can only request them from the government of the respective dependency or territory. British nationals from these jurisdictions applying directly in the UK receive a common format passport. BOTCs who are also British citizens may hold both types of passports.

In the machine-readable zone of BOTC variant passports, the field of the issuing state used to be three-letter ISO 3166-1 alpha-3 code of the territory, which allowed automatic distinction between BOTCs of different territories. However, after HM Passport Office in the UK assumed the responsibility for the production of BOTC variant passports in 2015, the code of the issuing state changed to GBR for all territories, thus making it impossible to identify the holder's domicile without the aid of other features, such as the passport cover. The lack of automatic distinction created problems for Bermudians travelling to the United States, who do not need a visa or ESTA if identified as BOTCs of Bermuda, but need one if identified as British citizens. On 30 April 2024, the code BMU was restored to Bermuda variant passports to facilitate such travel.

=== Special British passports ===
Diplomatic passports are issued to British diplomats and high-ranking government officials and their dependents. Official passports are issued to other British government officials such as administrative and technical staff and their dependents.

King's Messenger passports were issued to diplomatic couriers who transport government documents. Since 2014, these have been replaced by standard diplomatic passports with an observation.

Diplomatic and Official Passports (Series C)

Depiction of a British biometric diplomatic passport

Depiction of a British biometric official passport

Identity card from a collective passport issued in 2005

Collective (also known as group) passports are issued to defined groups of 5 to 50 individuals who are British citizens under the age of 18 for travel together to certain countries in the Schengen Area, such as a group of school children on a school trip.

Emergency passports are issued to British nationals by British diplomatic missions across the world. They may also be issued to Commonwealth citizens in countries where their country of nationality does not have diplomatic representation.

=== European Union passports ===
Before the UK withdrew from the EU on 31 January 2020, British citizens, British Overseas Territories citizens of Gibraltar and British subjects with right of abode in the UK were considered to be UK nationals for the purposes of European Union law and therefore EU citizens. As a result, passports issued to these nationals were considered to be EU passports, and before 2019 their covers displayed the title "European Union". British passports with EU status facilitated access to consular assistance from another European Union member state.

British nationals who were EU citizens (except those connected only to the Crown Dependencies) had the right to live and work freely in the European Economic Area and Switzerland until the Brexit transition period ended on 31 December 2020. Since then, they continue to enjoy visa-free travel to the Schengen Area for short stays, as well as the right to live and work in the Republic of Ireland, as British citizens are not treated as aliens under Irish law. Common Travel Area arrangements for visa-free travel remain unchanged.

Other classes of British nationals were not considered to be EU citizens, but also had and continue to enjoy visa-free travel to the Schengen Area for short stays.

== Physical appearance ==
=== Outside cover ===
Current issue British passports are described as navy blue although many observers have described the colour as black.

The blue passport sports the coat of arms of the United Kingdom emblazoned in the centre of the front cover. "BRITISH PASSPORT" is inscribed above the coat of arms, and the name of the issuing government is inscribed below (e.g. "UNITED KINGDOM OF GREAT BRITAIN AND NORTHERN IRELAND" or "TURKS AND CAICOS ISLANDS"). Where a British national is connected to a territory that is no longer under British sovereignty (e.g. BN(O) in Hong Kong), the issuing government is the United Kingdom. The biometric passport symbol appears at the bottom of the front cover. The rear cover of blue passports are also embossed with the floral emblems of England (Tudor rose), Northern Ireland (Shamrock), Scotland (Scottish thistle) and Wales (daffodil).

Burgundy passports issued by the UK, Gibraltar and the Crown Dependencies follow a different format, as they are based on the EU common model. The words "UNITED KINGDOM OF GREAT BRITAIN AND NORTHERN IRELAND" (+ "GIBRALTAR" where relevant) or "BRITISH ISLANDS" (+ the Dependency's name) are inscribed above the coat of arms, whilst the word "PASSPORT" is inscribed below. The biometric passport symbol appears at the bottom of the front cover. On passports issued before 29 March 2019, the words "EUROPEAN UNION" were printed at the top of the booklet.

==== Function-related passports ====
Besides the ordinary passports described above, special passports are issued to government officials from which diplomatic status may (diplomatic passport) or may not (official passport) be conferred by the text on the cover. Until 2014 a special passport was available for a Queen's Messenger, which had on its cover the text "QUEEN’S MESSENGER – COURRIER DIPLOMATIQUE" below the coat of arms and the text "BRITISH PASSPORT" above it. Despite the red cover, the internal pages continued to resemble those of the old blue passport.

Each passport cover is detailed in the gallery below.

=== Inside cover ===
UK-issued British passports issued during the reign of Queen Elizabeth II contain on their inside cover the following words in English:

Her Britannic Majesty's Secretary of State requests and requires in the name of Her Majesty all those whom it may concern to allow the bearer to pass freely without let or hindrance and to afford the bearer such assistance and protection as may be necessary.

Following the accession of King Charles III, the request now reads:

His Britannic Majesty's Secretary of State requests and requires in the name of His Majesty…

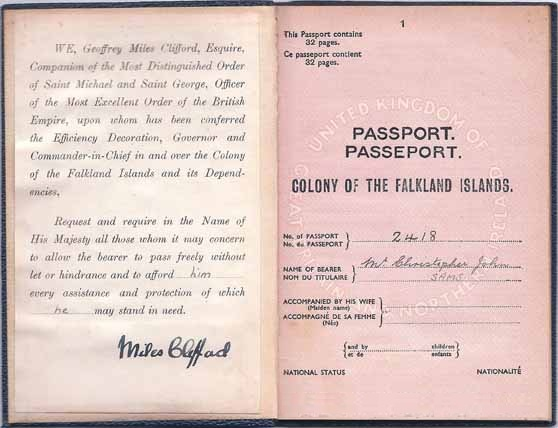
Inside cover pages of a Falkland Islands passport (not issued after 1982) showing the request being made by the Governor of the Falkland Islands, who was also named

In older passports, more specific reference was made to "Her Britannic Majesty's Principal Secretary of State for Foreign Affairs", originally including the name of the incumbent.

In mid-July 2023, the Home Office announced that British passports were now being issued in King Charles's name.

In non-UK issue passports, the request is made by the Governor or Lieutenant-Governor of the territory in "the Name of His Britannic Majesty".

=== Information page ===
British passports issued by HM Passport Office include the following data on the information page:

- Photograph of the owner/holder (digital image printed on page)
- Type (P)
- Code of issuing state (GBR)
- Passport number
- Surname (see note below regarding titles)
- Given names
- Nationality (the class of British nationality, such as "British Citizen" or "British Overseas Citizen", or if issued on behalf of a Commonwealth country, "Commonwealth Citizen")
- Date of birth
- Sex (Gender)
- Place of birth (only the city or town is listed, even if born outside the UK; places of birth in Wales are entered in Welsh upon request)
- Date of issue
- Authority
- Date of expiry
- Machine-readable zone starting with P< GBR

The items are identified by text in English and French (e.g., "Given names/Prénoms"). Translations into Welsh, Scottish Gaelic, Irish and Spanish are written on page 5 (Series C), with the English and French translation also being included (e.g., "Surname / Cyfenw / Cinneadh / Sloinne / Nom / Apellidos"). Passports issued until March 2019 were translated into all official EU languages.

According to the British government, the current policy of using noble titles on passports requires that the applicant provides evidence that the title is included in Burke's Peerage, or the Lord Lyon has recognised a feudal barony. If accepted (and if the applicant wishes to include the title), the correct form is for the applicant to include the territorial designation as part of their surname (Surname of territorial designation e.g. Smith of Inverglen). The official observation would then show the holder's full name, followed by their feudal title e.g. The holder is John Smith, Baron of Inverglen.

=== Official Observations page ===
Certain British passports are issued with printed endorsements on the Official Observations page, usually in upper case (capital letters). (Note: Machine-readable passports did not have a dedicated observations page. They were instead printed on a blank visa page (usually page 5).) They form part of the passport when it is issued, as distinct from immigration stamps subsequently entered in the visa pages. Some examples are:

- The Holder has right of abode in the United Kingdom

British Subjects with the right of abode (usually from Ireland) have this endorsement in their passports. Between 1973 and 1982, this observation was also in passports issued to British Subjects with a connection to the UK (now British Citizens).

- The Holder is entitled to readmission in the United Kingdom

British Overseas Citizens who have been granted indefinite leave to enter or remain after 1968 retain this entitlement for life as their ILR is not subject to the two-year expiration rule, and their passports are accordingly issued with this endorsement.

- The Holder is subject to control under the Immigration Act 1971

British nationals without the right of abode in the UK will have this endorsement in their passports unless they have been granted indefinite leave to enter or remain. However, even though a BN(O) passport does not entitle the holder the right of abode in the UK, this endorsement was not found in BN(O) passports issued before 2020.

- The Holder is not entitled to benefit from European Union provisions relating to employment or establishment

British citizens from Jersey, Guernsey and the Isle of Man without a qualifying connection to the United Kingdom by descent or residency for more than five years previously had this endorsement in their passports. Moreover, British Overseas Citizens and British Nationals (Overseas) would have the same endorsement if they renewed their BOC/BN(O) passport after 29 March 2019. This observation ceased to be used from 1 January 2021.

- In accordance with the United Kingdom immigration rules the holder of this passport does not require an entry certificate or visa to visit the United Kingdom

This endorsement is found in BN(O) passports, and accordingly holders of BN(O) passports are allowed to enter the UK as a visitor without an entry certificate or visa for up to six months per entry.

- The Holder is also a British National (Overseas)

British citizens who also possess BN(O) status may have this endorsement in their passports to signify their additional status, with the holder’s consent.

- The Holder (of this passport has Hong Kong permanent identity card no XXXXXXXX which states that the holder) has the right of abode in Hong Kong

British Nationals (Overseas) (BN(O)s) have this endorsement in their passports, as registration as a BN(O) before 1997 required the applicant to hold a valid Hong Kong permanent identity card, which guaranteed the holder's right of abode in Hong Kong.
Such persons would continue to have right of abode or right to land in Hong Kong after the transfer of sovereignty over Hong Kong in 1997 under the Immigration Ordinance. This endorsement is also found in a British citizen passport when the holder has both British citizenship and BN(O) status (at the holder’s request).
Before the Hong Kong Act 1985 and Hong Kong (British Nationality) Order 1986 were enacted, nationals of Hong Kong were entitled to British Dependent Territory Citizen status (British Subject CUKC before 1983). The observation then merely read:

The Holder has right of abode in Hong Kong.

- The Holder is or The Holder is also known as ...

This endorsement is found in passports where the holder uses or retains another professional, stage or religious name and is known by it "for all purposes", or has a recognised form of address, academic, feudal or legal title (e.g. Doctor, European Engineer, King's Counsel, Professor, Minister of Religion) regarded as important identifiers of an individual. The styling 'Dr ...', 'Professor ...' or similar is recorded here, or the alternative professional/stage/religious name, usually on request by the passport holder.

This endorsement is also found in the passport of persons with Peerage titles, members of the Privy Council, holders of knighthoods and other decorations, etc, to declare the holder's title.

Also, this endorsement is found if the passport holder's name is too long to fit within the 30-character limits (including spaces) on the passport information page; applies to each line reserved for the surname and the first given name including any middle name(s). In this scenario the holder's full name will be written out in full on the Observations page. According to the British passport agency guidelines, a person with a long or multiple given name, which cannot fit within the 30-character passport information page limits, should enter as much of the first given name, followed by the initials of all middle names (if any). The same advice applies to a long or multiple surname. The holder's full name is then shown printed out in its entirety on the passport Observations page.

- The holder's name in Chinese Commercial Code: XXXX XXXX XXXX

This endorsement was found in BN(O) and Hong Kong British Dependent Territories Citizen passports held by BN(O)s and British Dependent Territories Citizens with a connection to Hong Kong who have a Chinese name recognised by the Hong Kong Immigration Department before the handover. After the handover, British passports issued in Hong Kong can only be issued at the British Consulate-General, and this endorsement is no longer in use. (See also: Chinese commercial code)

- Holder is a member of His Britannic Majesty's Diplomatic Service
- Holder is a spouse/dependant of a member of His Britannic Majesty's Diplomatic Service

This endorsement is found in British passports held by people who are dependants or spouses of British diplomats.

== Multiple passports ==
People who have valid reasons may be allowed to hold more than one passport booklet. This applies usually to people who travel frequently on business, and may need to have a passport booklet to travel on while the other is awaiting a visa for another country. Some countries in the Arab League do not issue visas to visitors if their passports bear a stamp or visa issued by Israel, as a result of the Arab League boycott of Israel. In that case, a person can apply for a second passport to avoid travel issues. Reasons and supporting documentation (such as a letter from an employer) must be provided.

In addition, a person who has multiple types of British nationality is allowed to hold different variants of British passports under different statuses at the same time. For example, a British Overseas Territories citizen with right of abode in Gibraltar that also held British citizenship would be allowed both a Gibraltar variant British passport as well as a standard British passport.

== Monarch ==
The King, Charles III, is not required to hold a passport because passports are issued in his name and on his authority, thus making it superfluous for him to hold one. All other members of the royal family, however, including the heir apparent William, Prince of Wales, do require passports.

== Visa requirements ==
Visa requirements for British citizens British Islands (United Kingdom, Isle of Man, Guernsey, Jersey– Right of Abode) Ireland (Common Travel Area) – Freedom of movement Visa not required / ESTA / eTA / eVisitor Visa available both on arrival or online (eVisa) Visa on arrival eVisa Visa required prior to arrival

Visa requirements for British citizens are administrative entry restrictions by the authorities of other states placed on citizens of the United Kingdom. As of May 2025, holders of regular British Citizen passports had visa-free or visa on arrival access to 186 countries and territories, ranking the British Citizen passport 6th in the world in terms of travel freedom (tied with the Belgian and Danish passports) according to the Henley Passport Index. Additionally, Arton Capital's Passport Index ranked the British Citizen passport 8th in the world in terms of travel freedom, with a visa-free score of 170 (tied with the Cypriot and United States passports), as of 14 May 2025.

Visa requirements for other categories of British nationals, namely British Nationals (Overseas), British Overseas Citizens, British Overseas Territories Citizens, British Protected Persons, and British Subjects, are different.

== Cost ==
The cost of a British passport is between free and £129.50, for an adult (16 and over) 50-page frequent traveler passport who apply by paper form. The standard adult application fee is £102 (online), or £115.50 (by paper form).

== Foreign travel statistics ==
The following data from the Office for National Statistics Travel Trends database estimate the number of visits made by UK residents abroad to most-visited countries in the year 2024.

Country	Number of visits (thousands)
Canada	657
United States	4,055
Austria	844
Belgium	1,428
Bulgaria	624
Czechia	671
Cyprus	1,289
Denmark	874
Finland	225
France	9,347
Germany	3,244
Greece	3,777
Hungary	831
Republic of Ireland	3,626
Italy	4,839
Lithuania	404
Luxembourg	119
Malta	743
Netherlands	2,688
Norway	593
Poland	2,926
Portugal	3,685
Romania	1,644
Russia	19
Slovakia	270
Spain	17,771
Sweden	551
Switzerland	1,039
Turkey	4,081
Egypt	771
Morocco	1,243
Tunisia	300
South Africa	345
Nigeria	251
Israel	89
United Arab Emirates	1,401
Hong Kong	368
China (excluding Hong Kong)	620
India	2,053
Japan	373
Pakistan	625
Sri Lanka	178
Thailand	593
Australia	564
New Zealand	160
Barbados	180
Jamaica	259
Brazil	209
Mexico	567

== Gallery of British passports ==
Current British Overseas Territories and Crown Dependencies passports

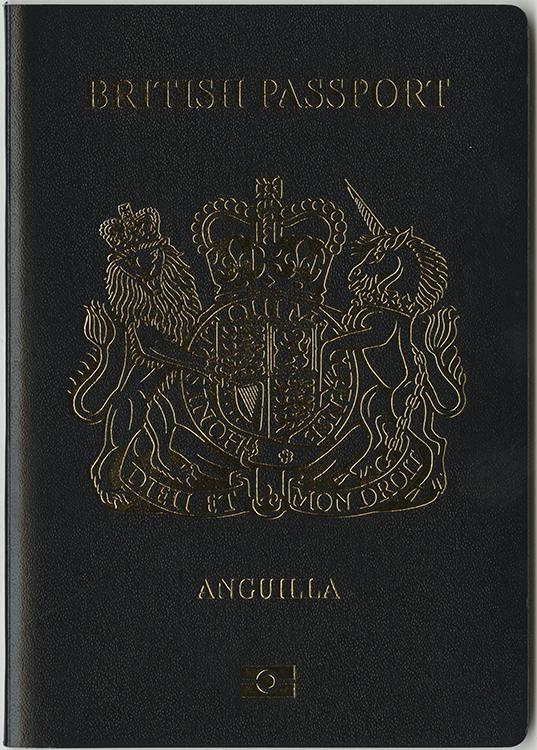
Anguilla

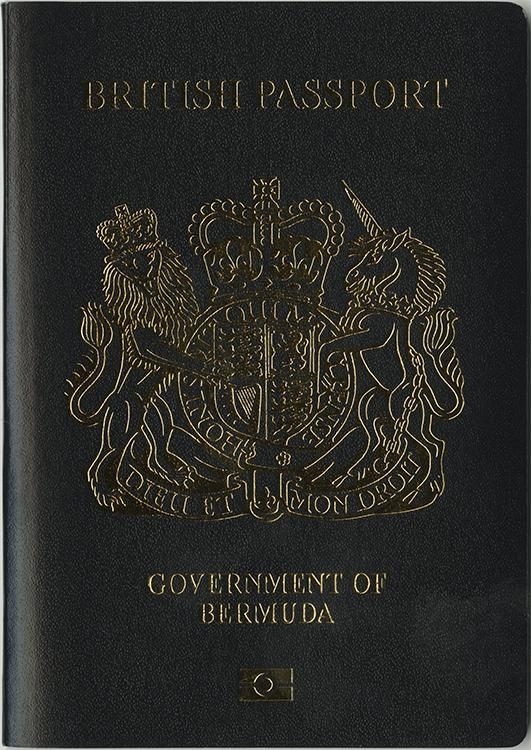
Bermuda

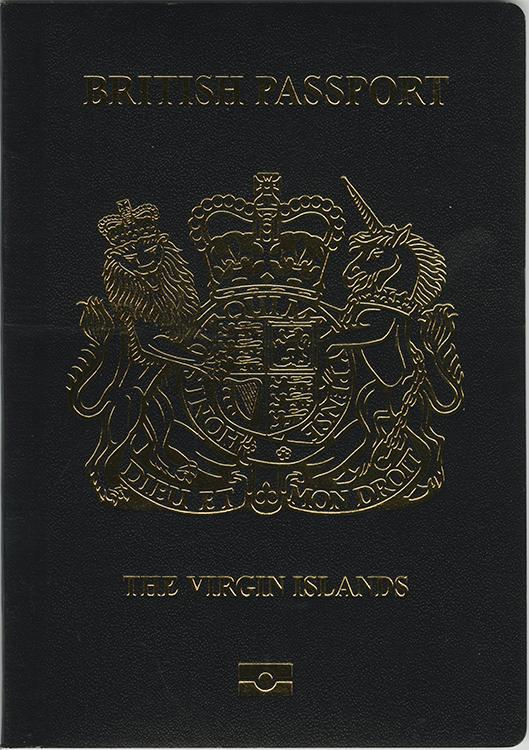
Virgin Islands

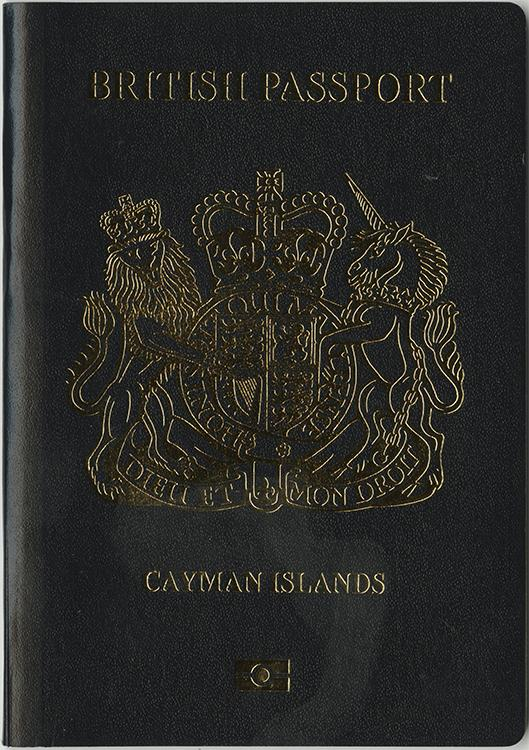
Cayman Islands

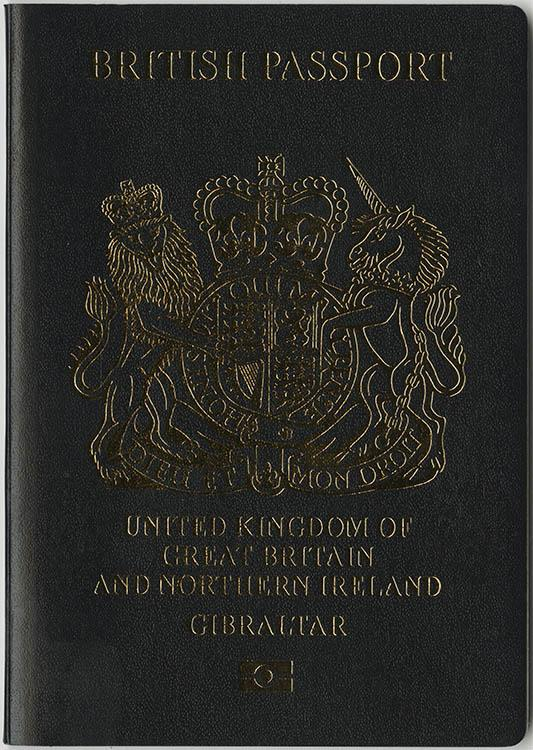
Gibraltar

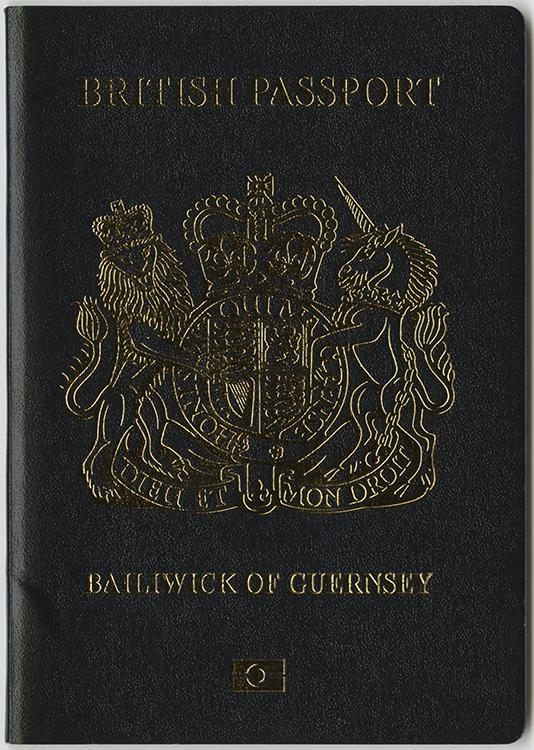
Guernsey

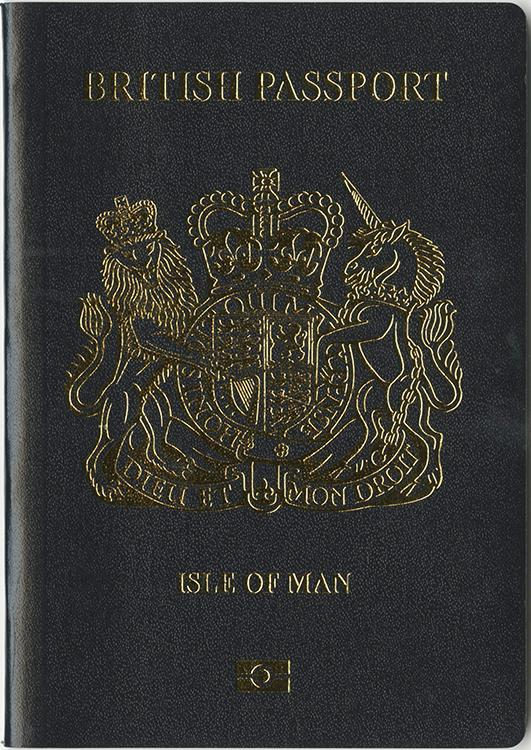
Isle of Man

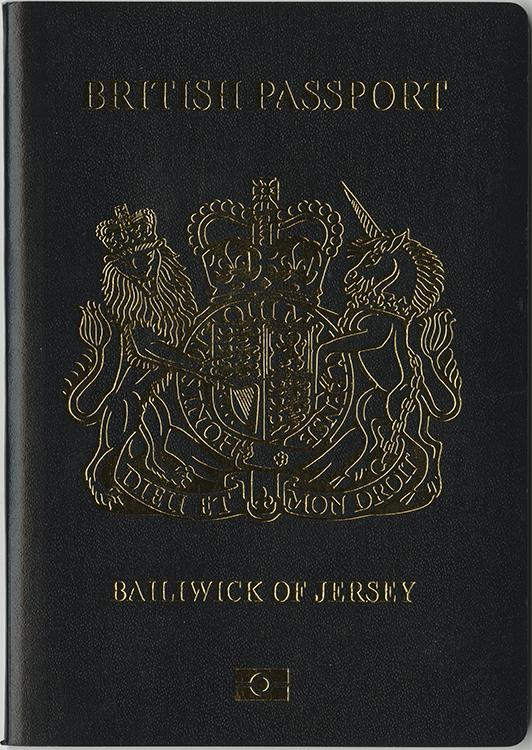
Jersey

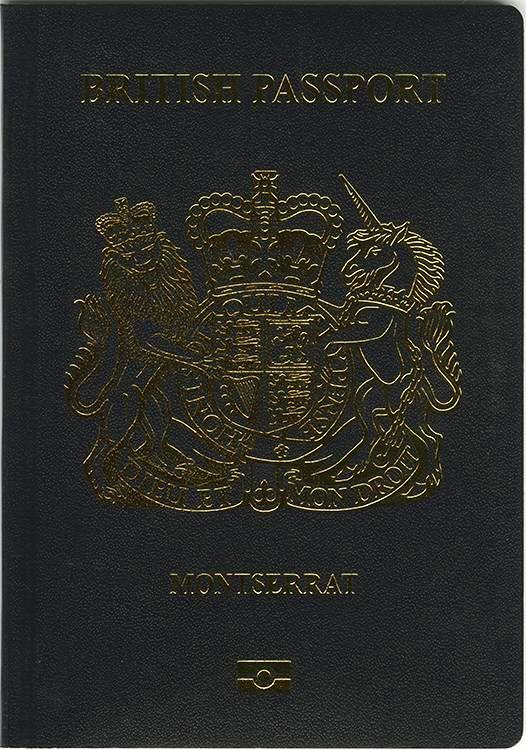
Montserrat

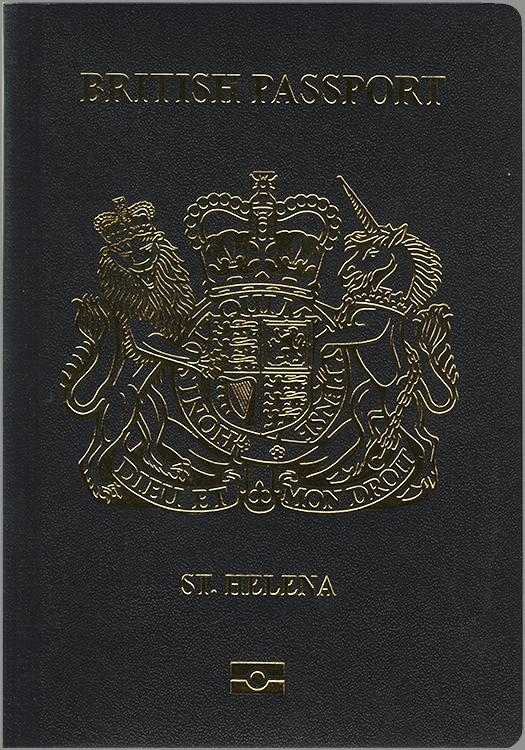
Saint Helena

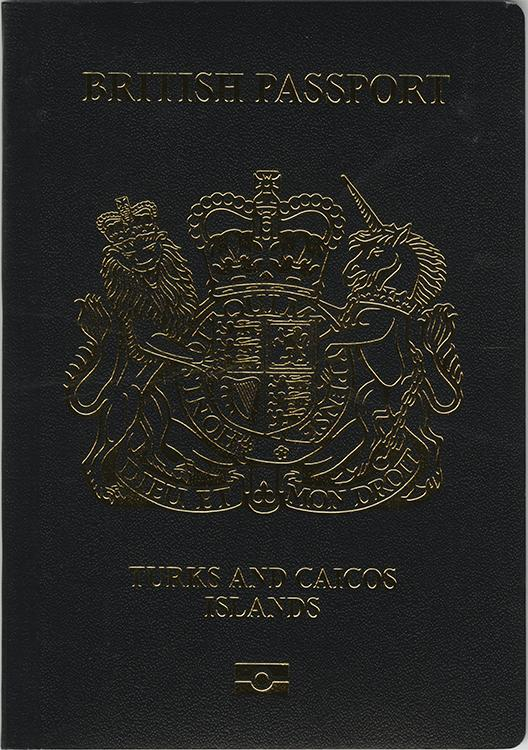
Turks and Caicos Islands
Previous Official and Diplomatic passports

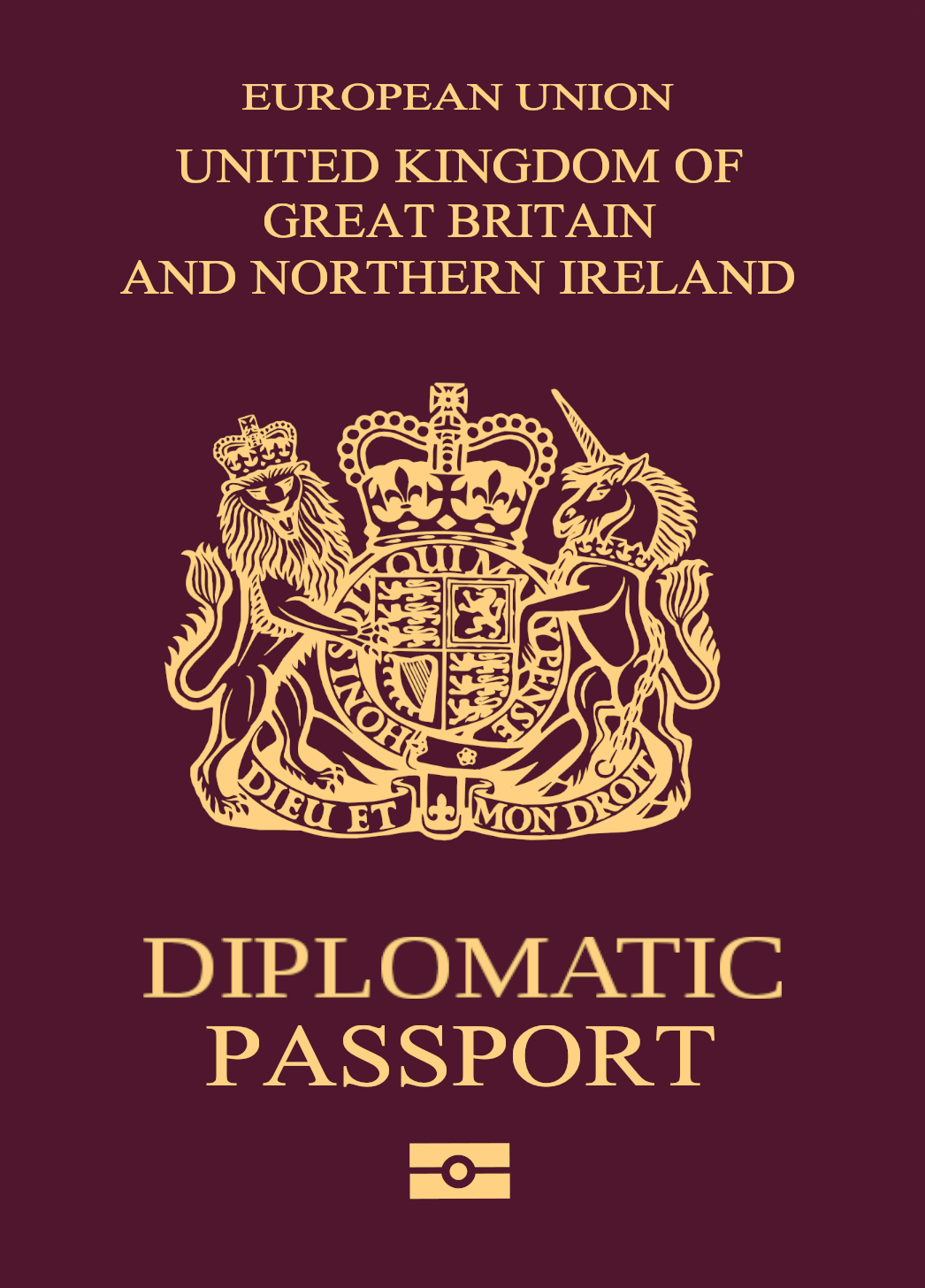
British biometric diplomatic passport

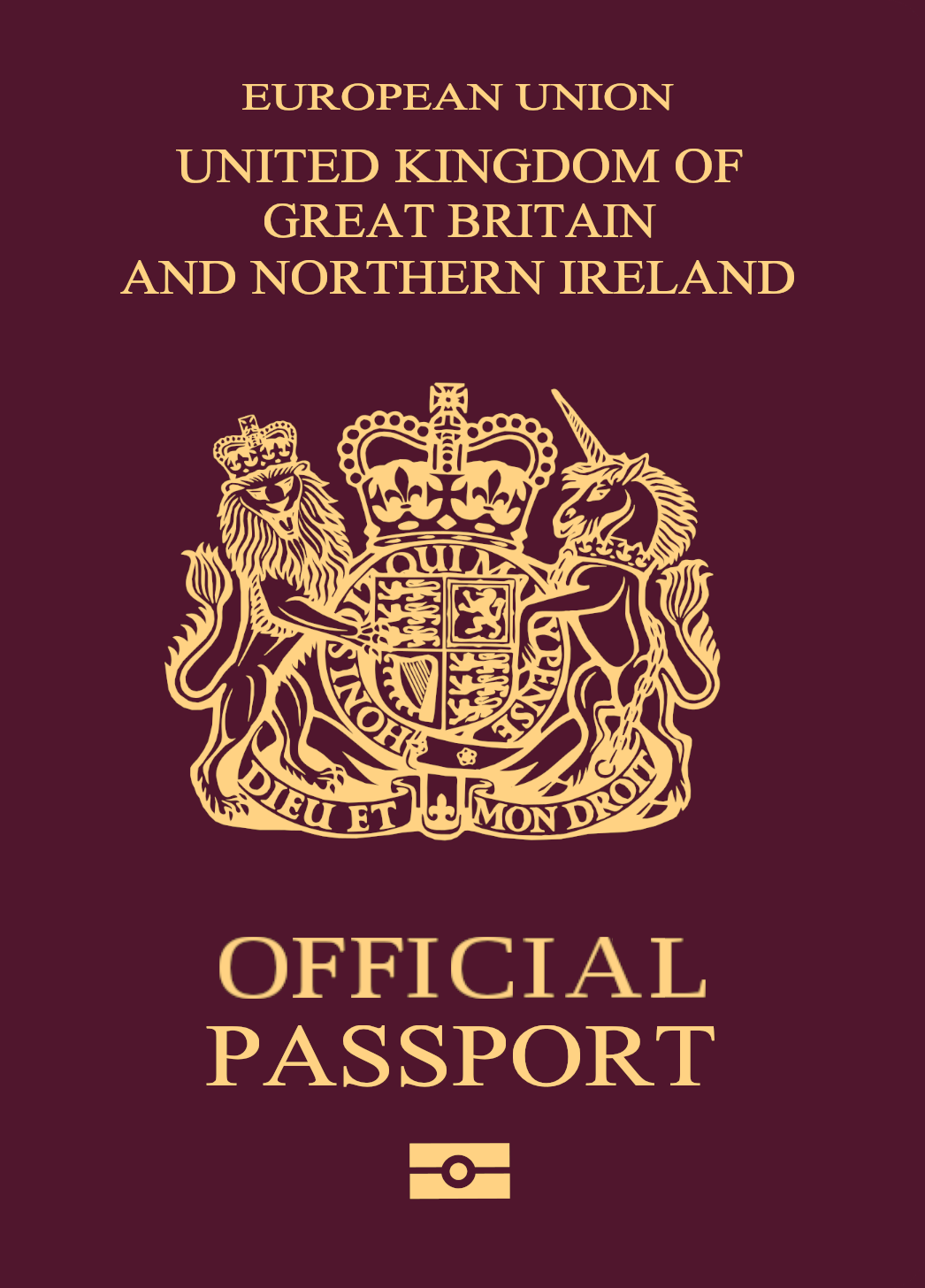
British biometric official passport

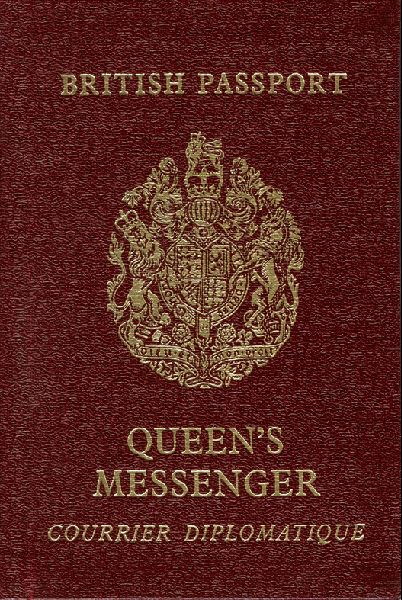
Queen's Messenger Passport
Current emergency and temporary passports

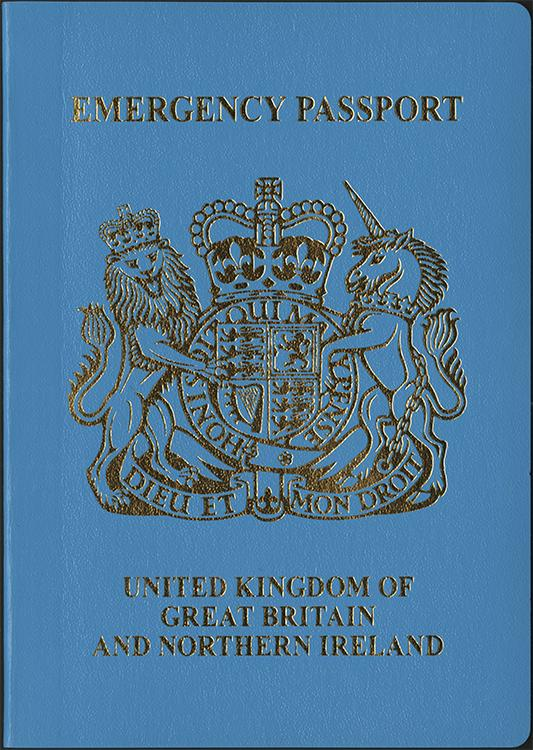
Series C emergency passport issued in the UK

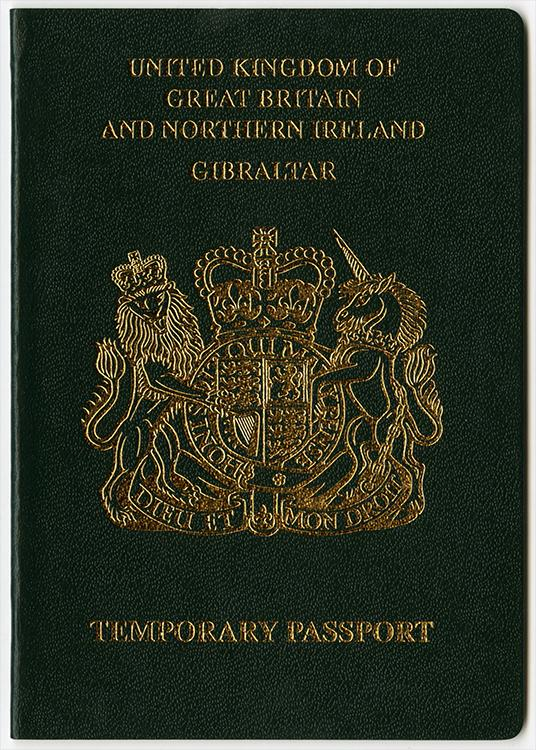
Series C temporary passport issued in Gibraltar

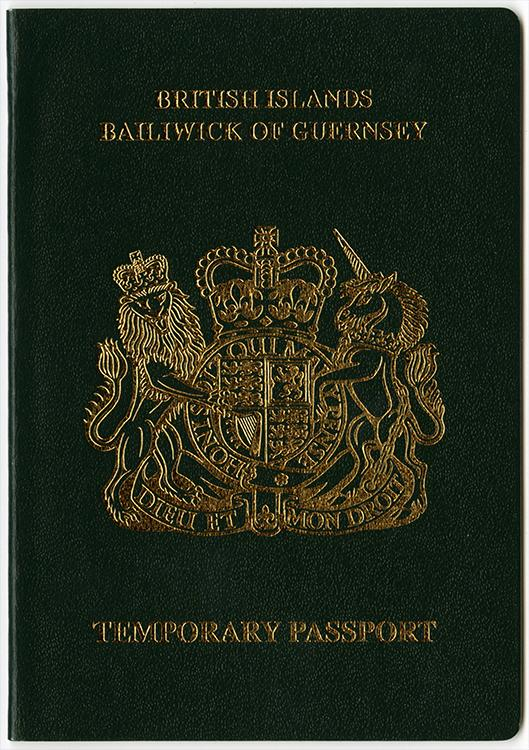
Series C temporary passport issued in Guernsey

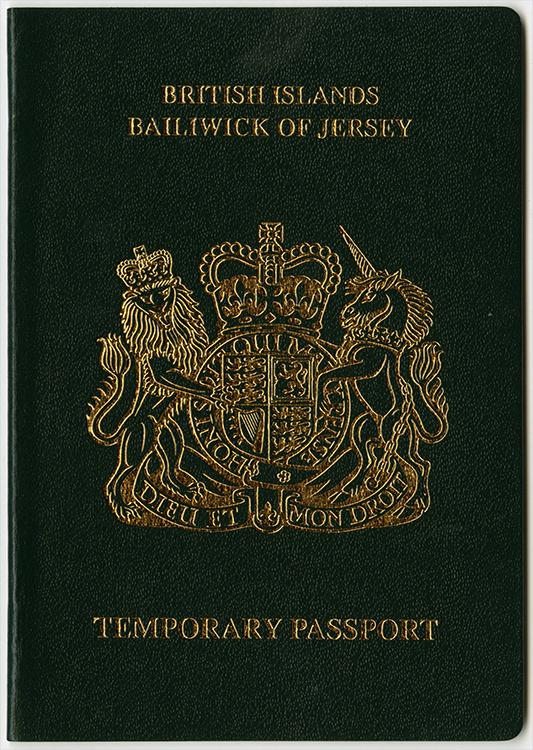
Series C temporary passport issued in Jersey

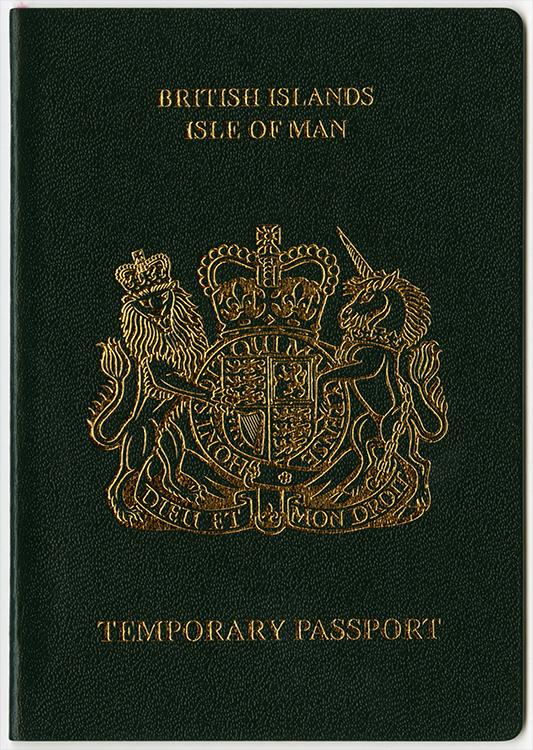
Series C temporary passport issued in the Isle of Man
Previously issued passports

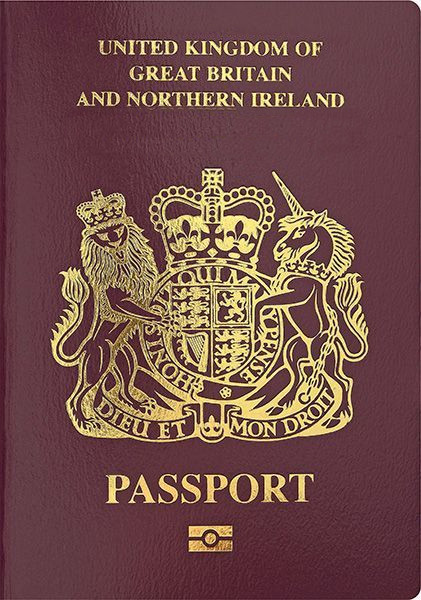
British Citizen passport issued between 30 March 2019 and early 2020 (non-EU design issued to all British nationals including British Citizens)

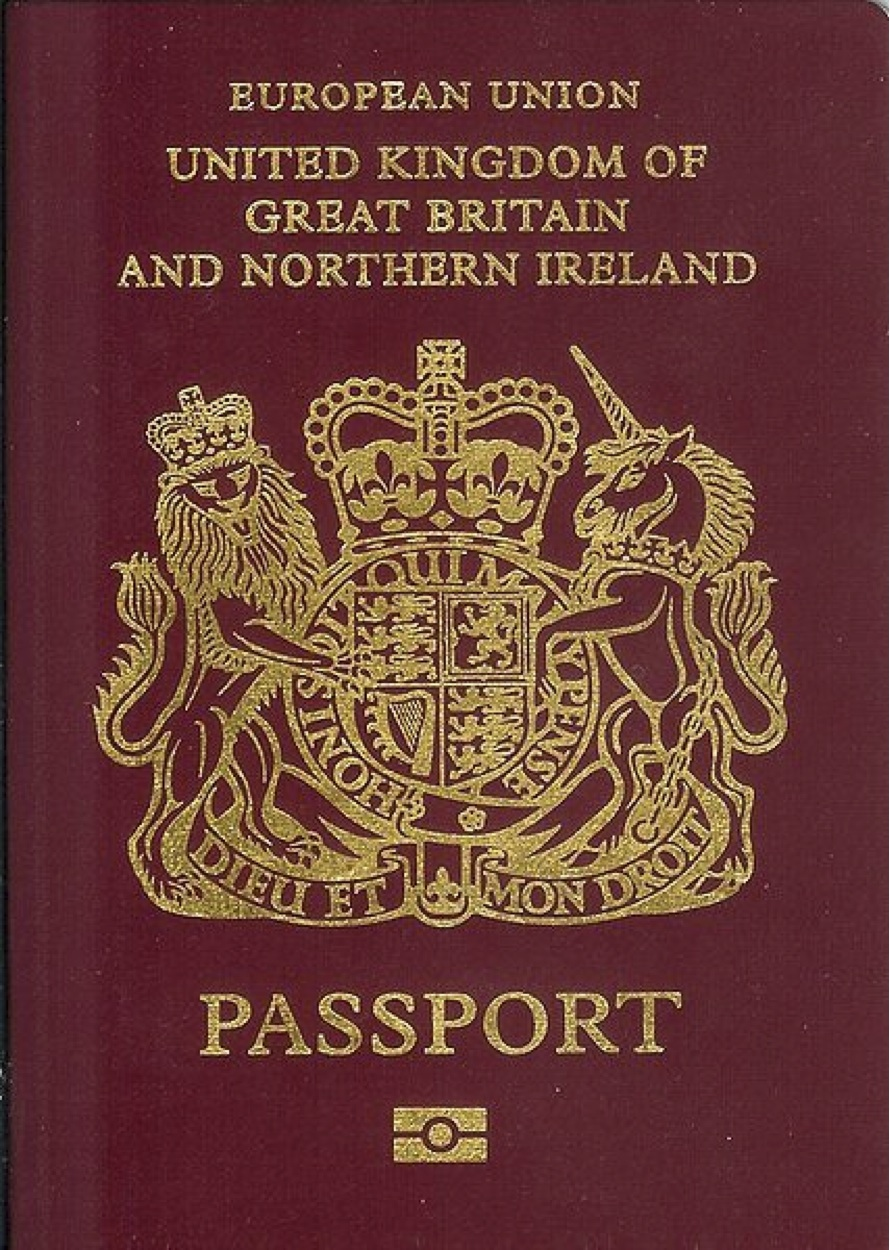
British Citizen passport issued prior to 30 March 2019 (last EU design issued to British Citizens)

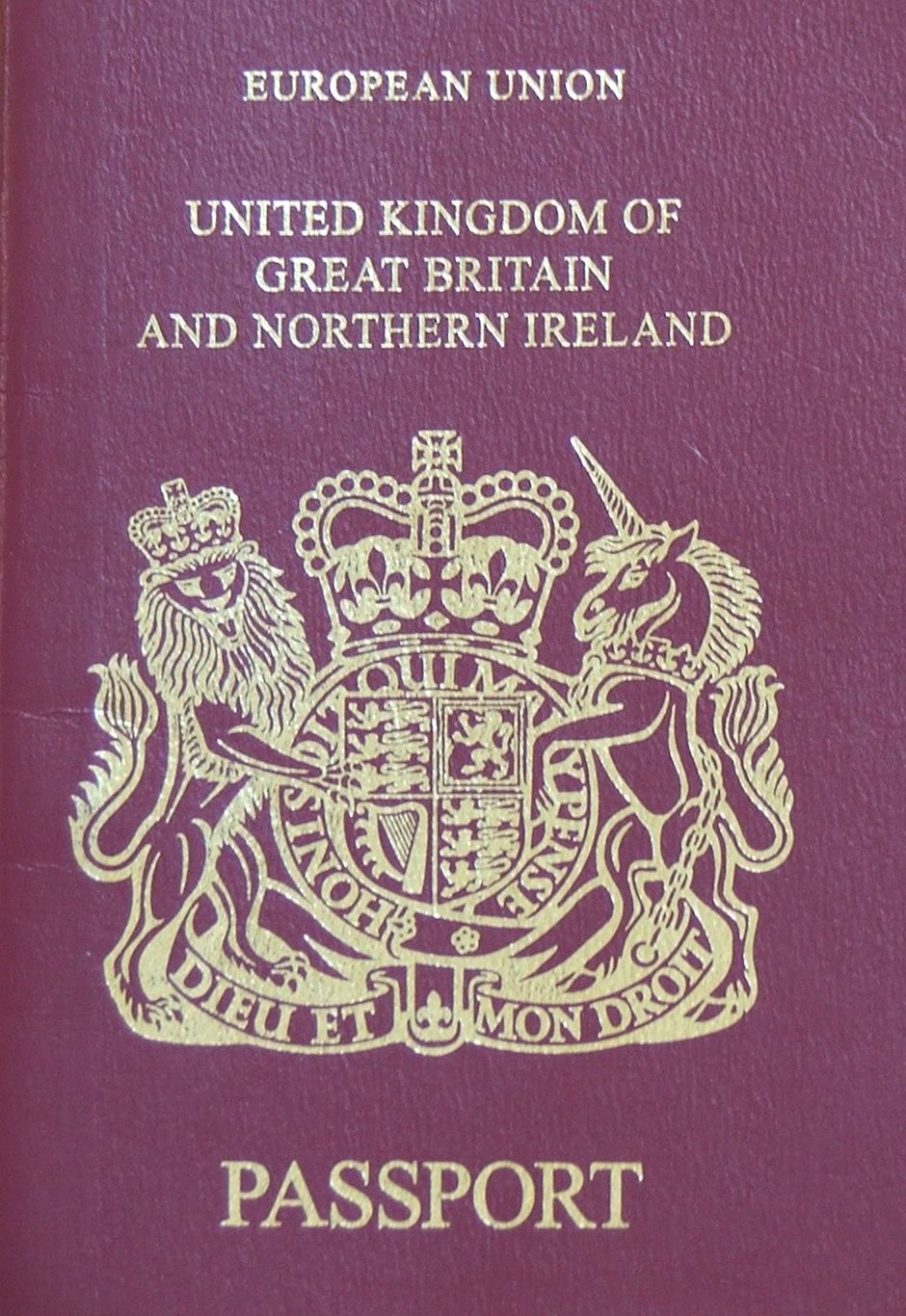
British non-biometric passport issued between 1997 and 2006

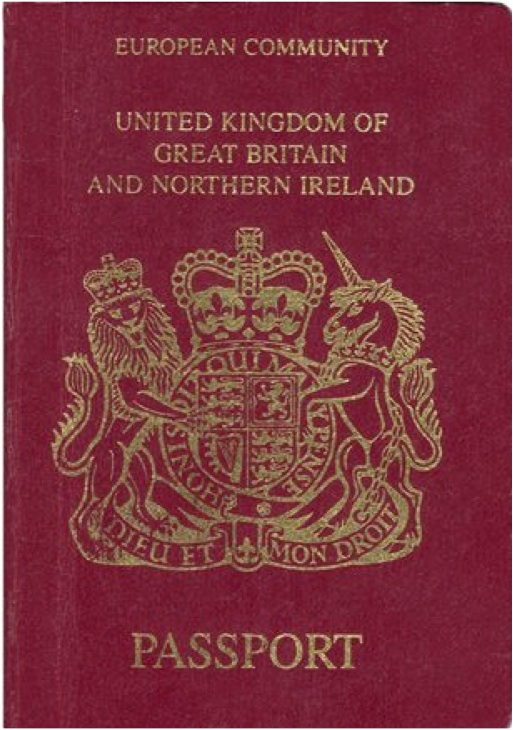
First British machine-readable passport issued between 1988 and 1997

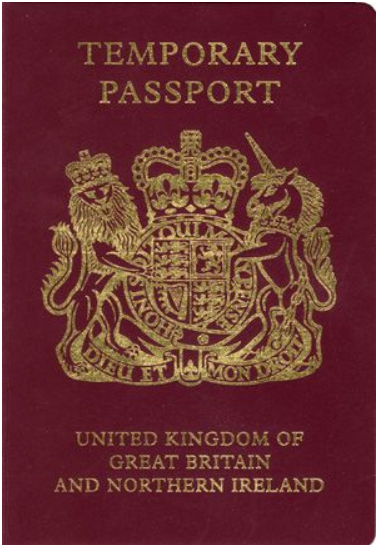
Series A temporary passport

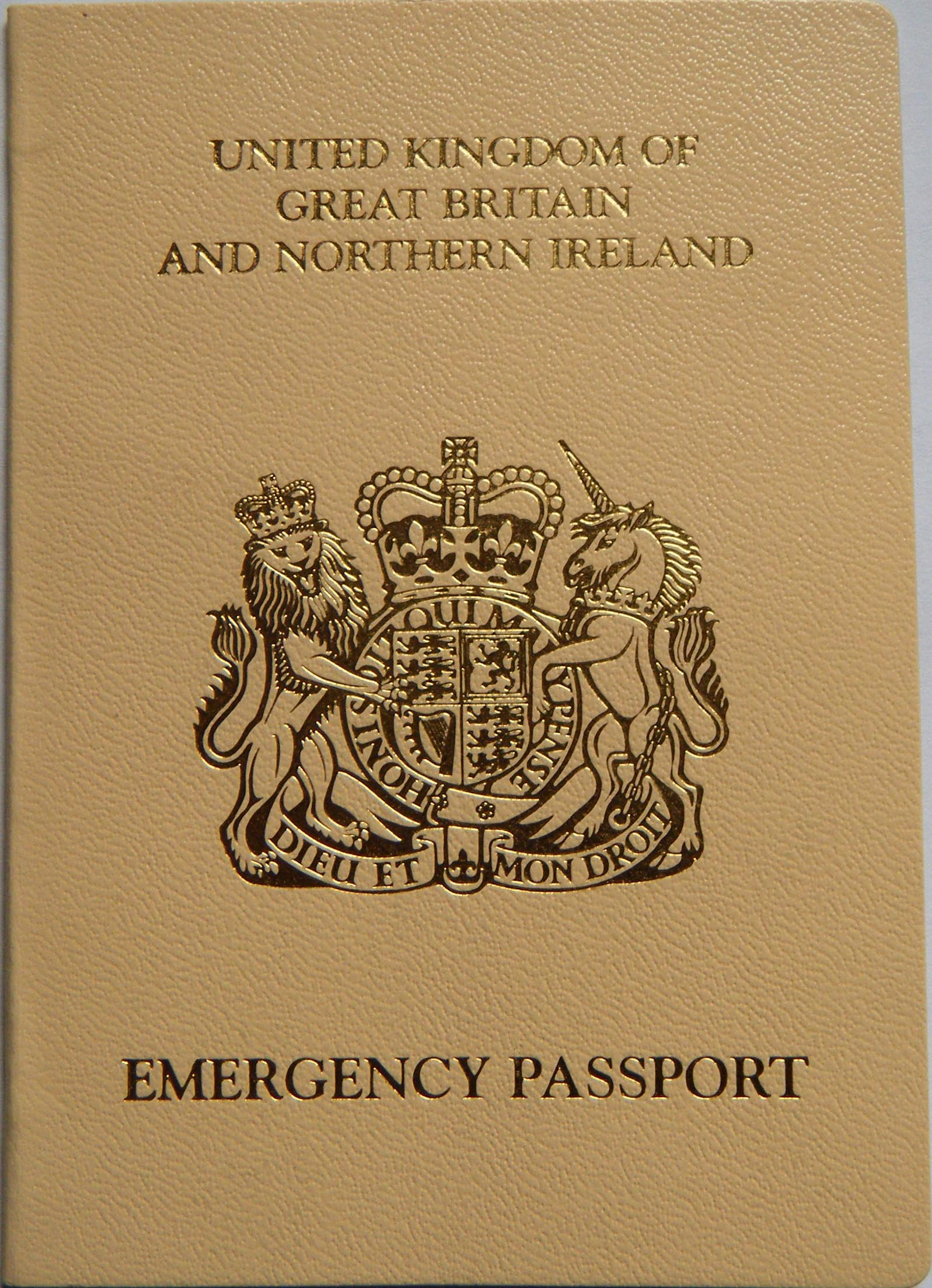
Series B emergency passport

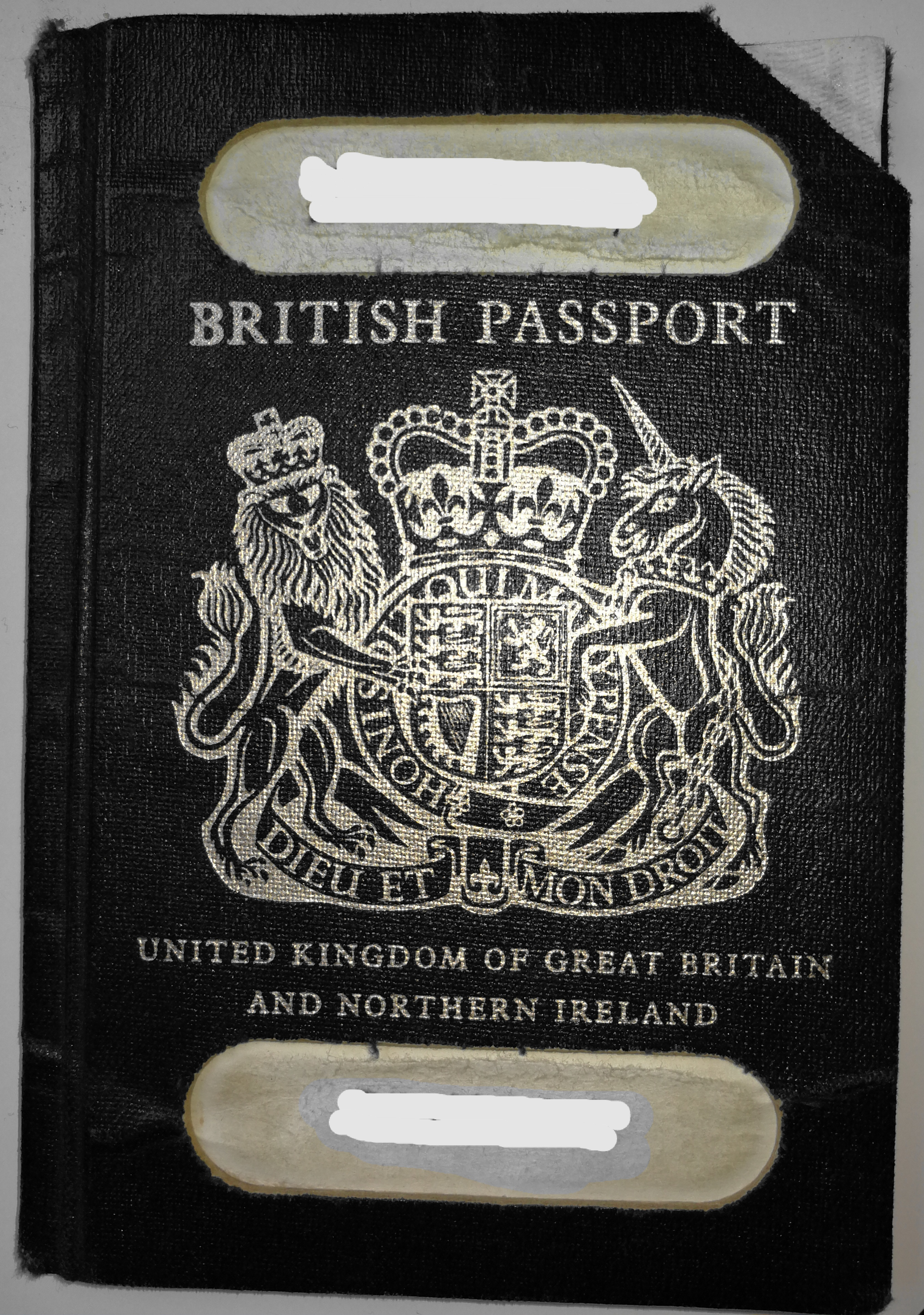
Last British non-machine readable passport issued prior to 1992

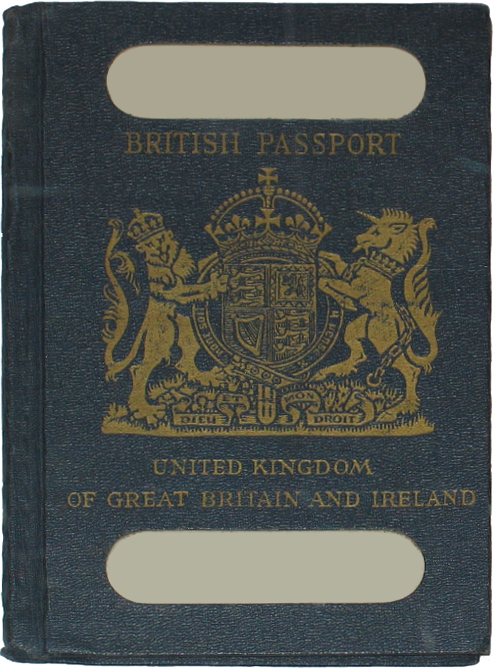
1921–27 United Kingdom of Great Britain and Ireland passport

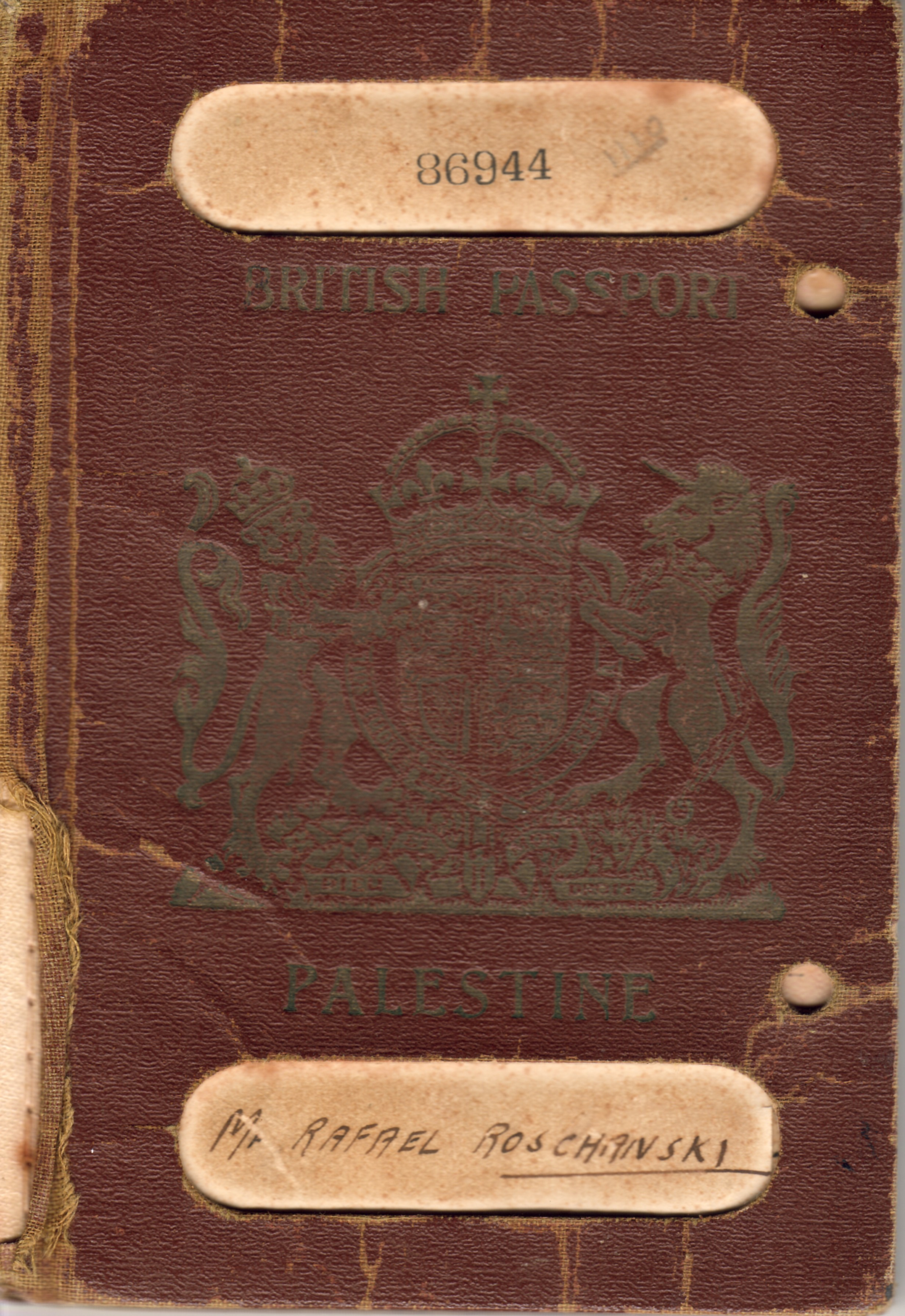
1939 Mandatory Palestine passport

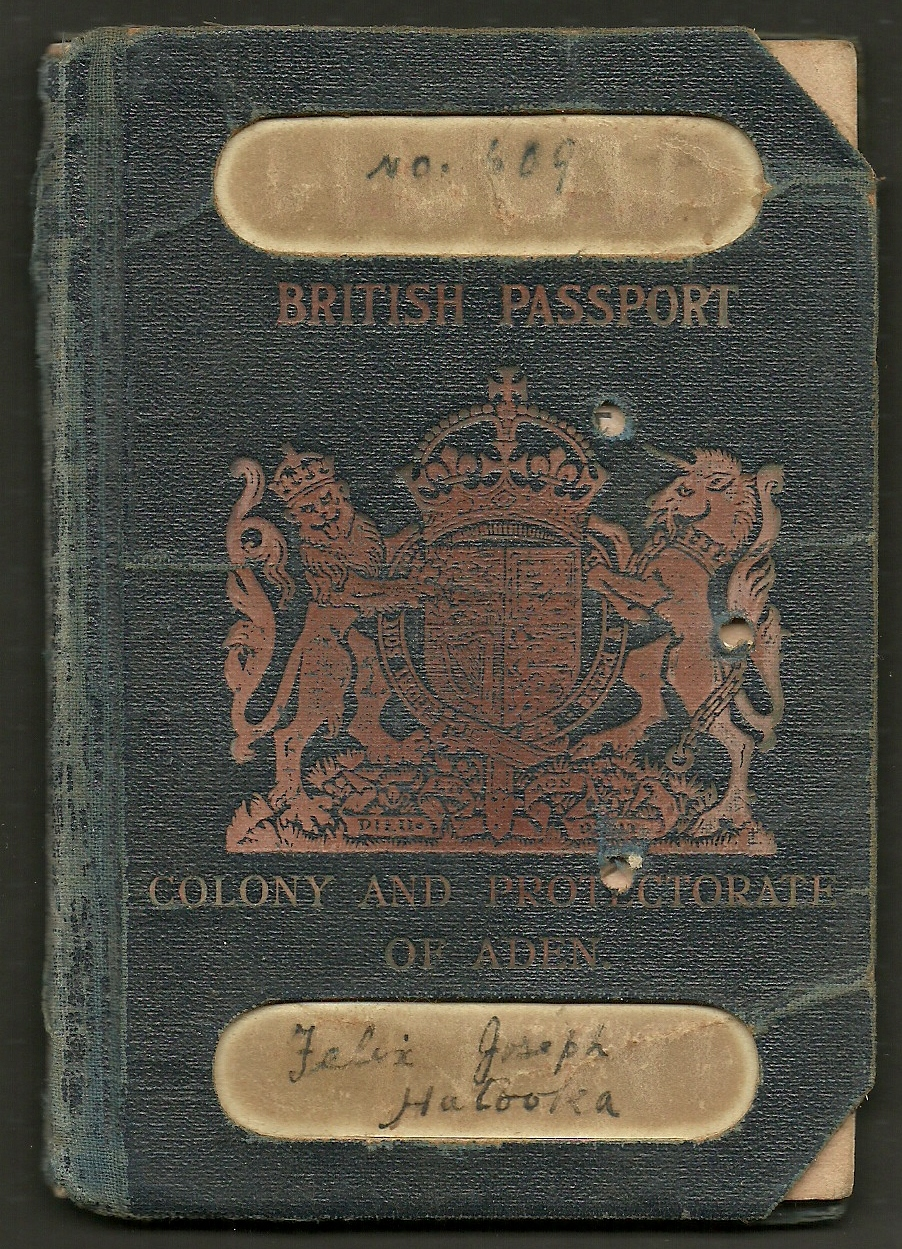
1940 Colony of Aden passport

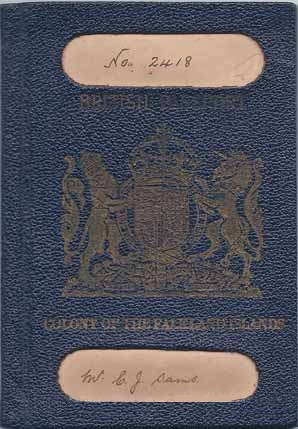
1947 Colony of the Falkland Islands passport

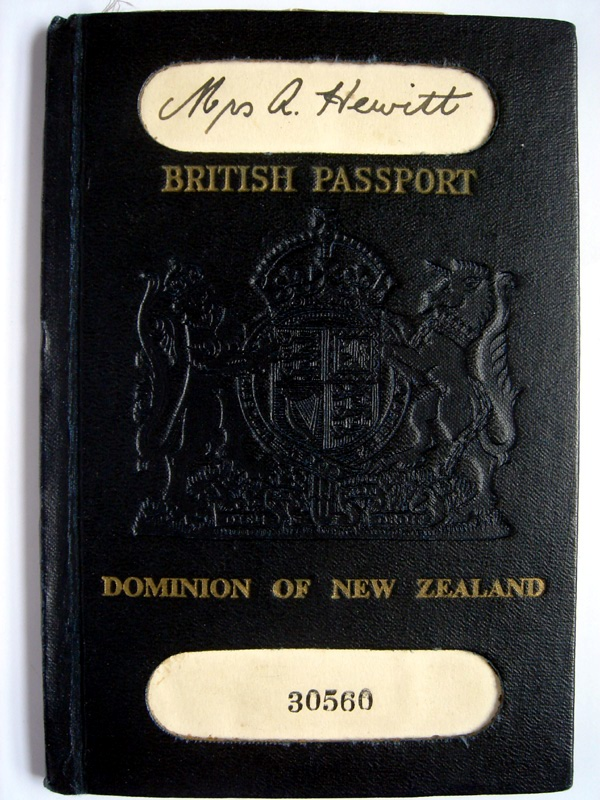
1949 Dominion of New Zealand passport

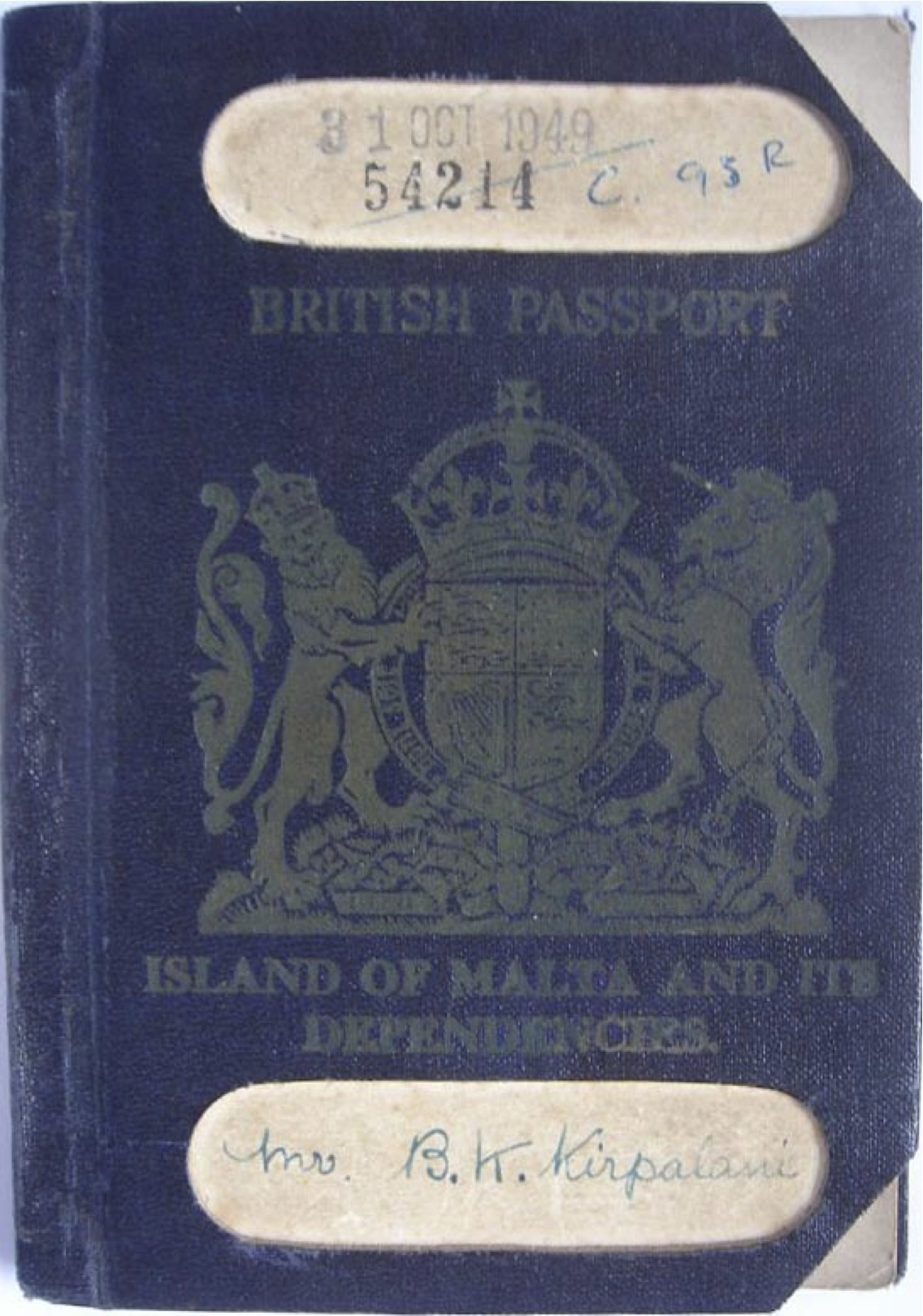
1949 Maltese passport

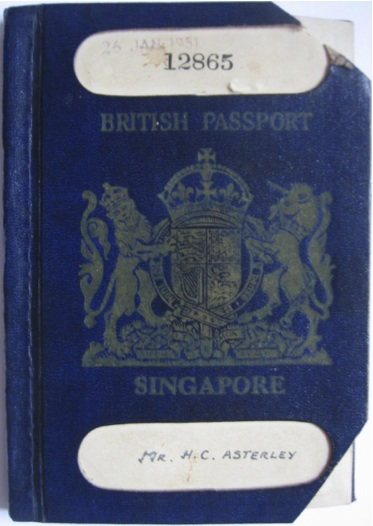
1951 Singapore passport

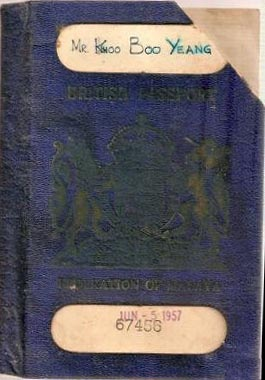
1957 Federation of Malaya passport

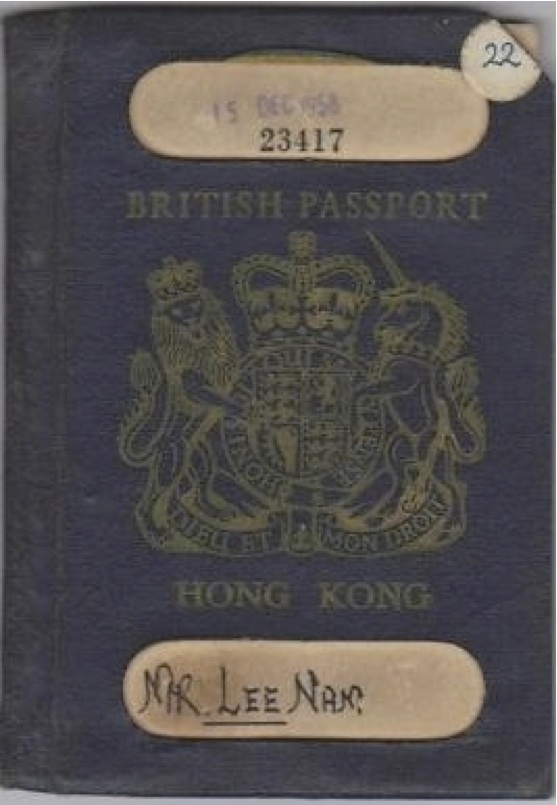
1958 British Hong Kong passport

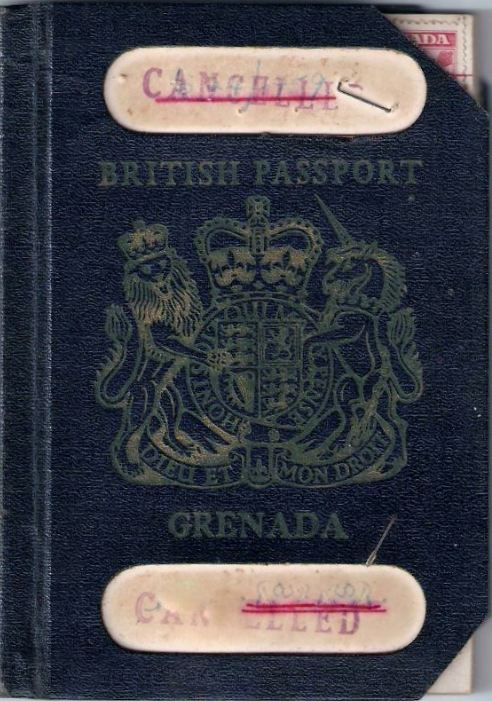
1959 Grenadian passport

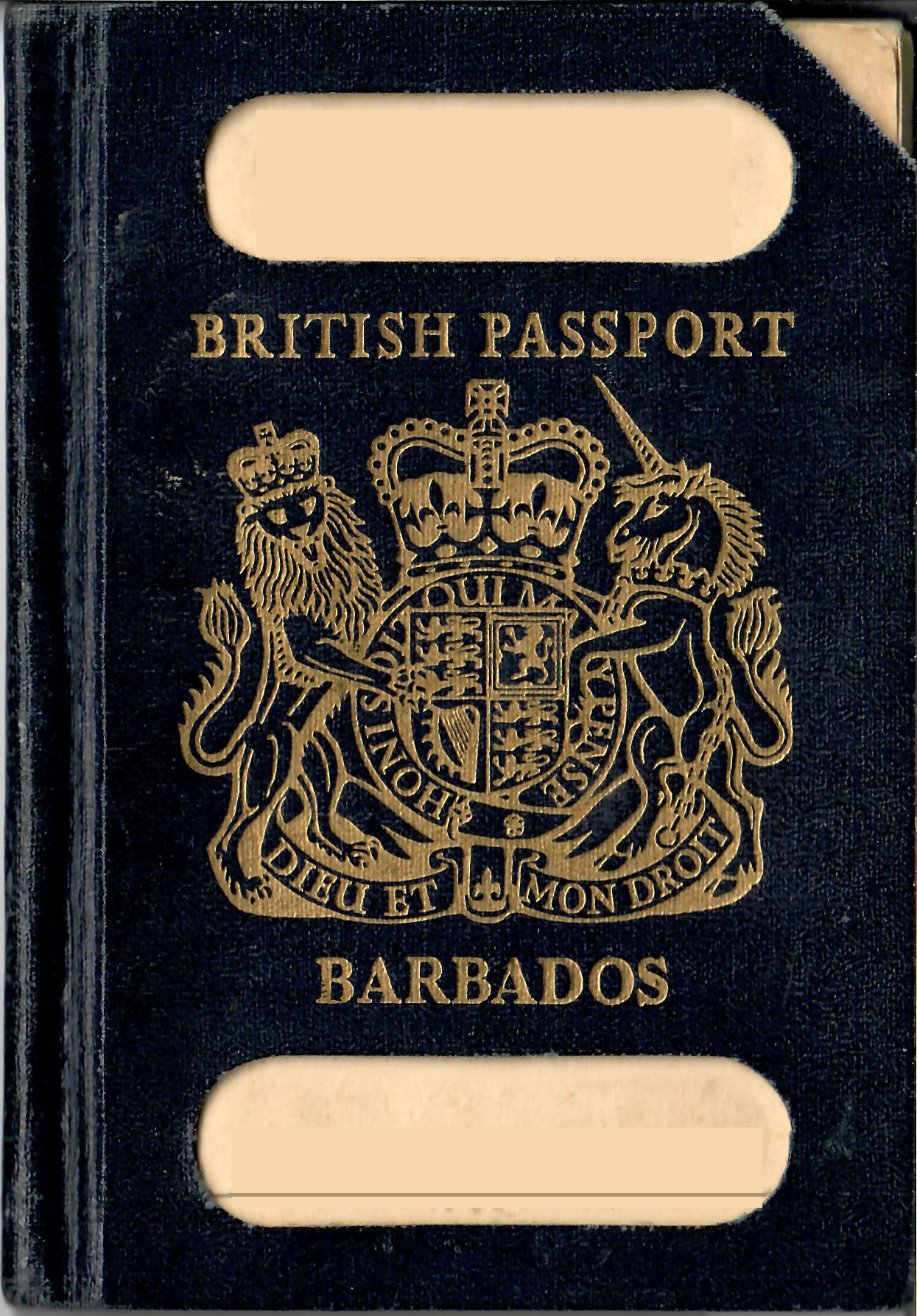
1963 British Barbados colonial passport

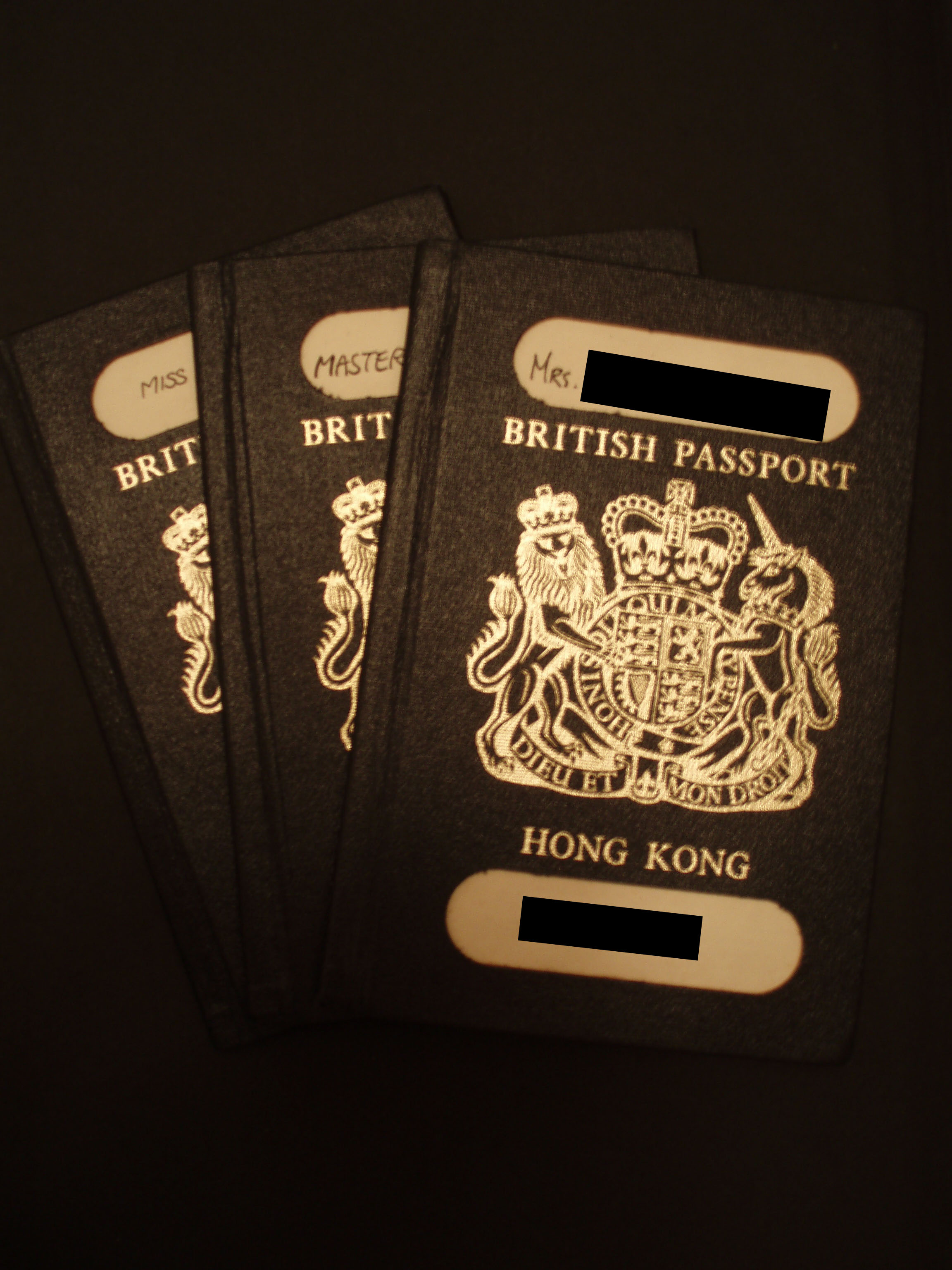
Pre-1990 Hong Kong British Dependent Territories Citizen (BDTC) passports

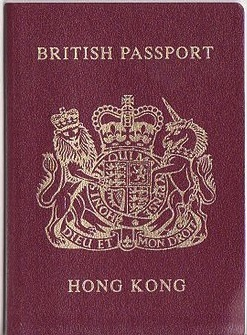
1997 Hong Kong BDTC passport

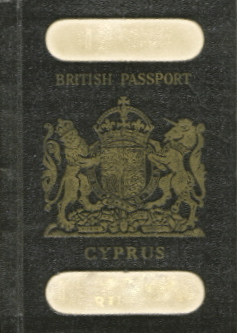
British Cyprus passport

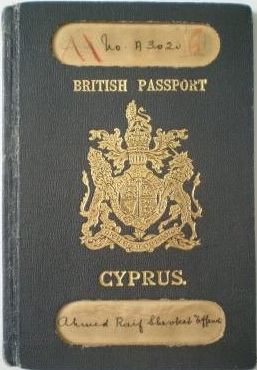
British Cyprus passport - older version

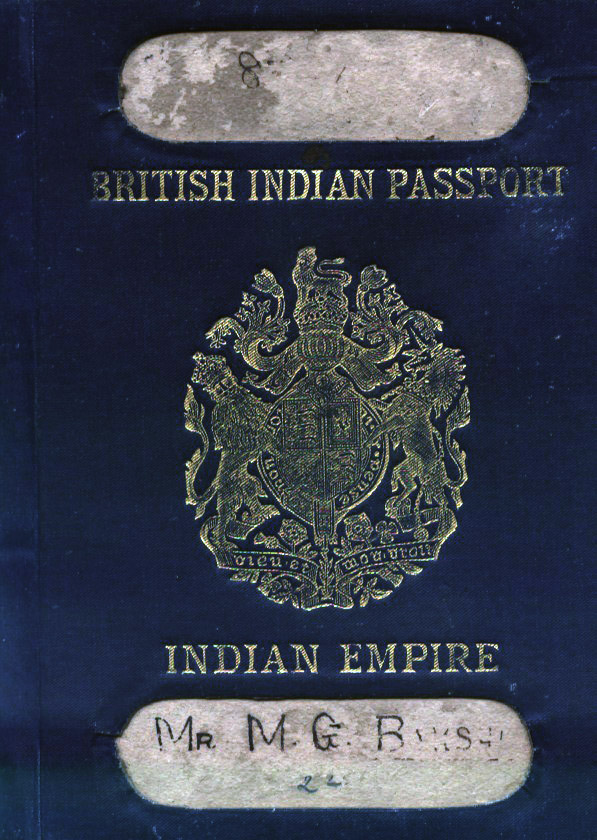
British Indian passport

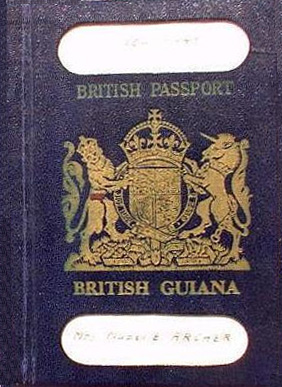
British Guiana passport

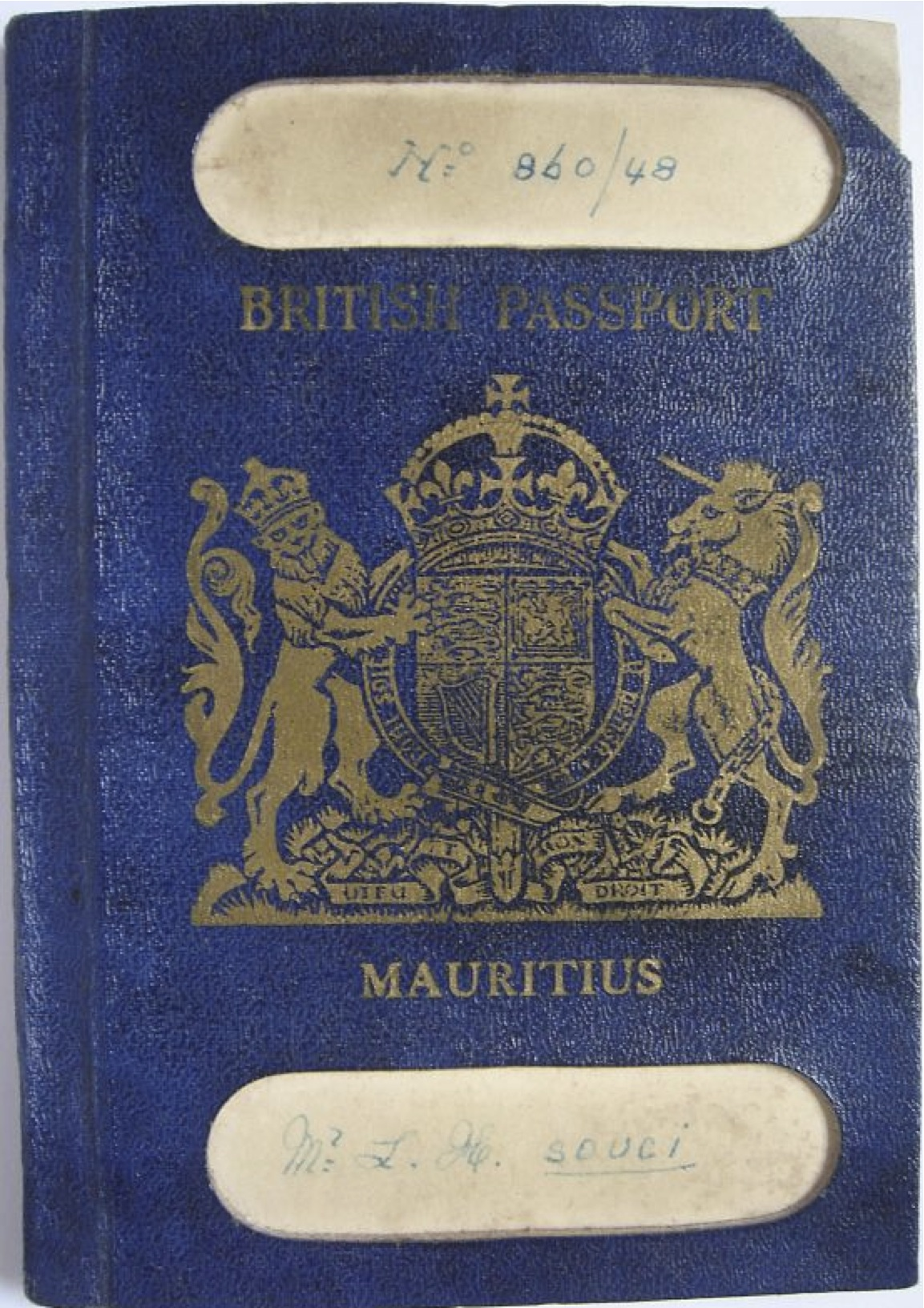
Mauritian passport

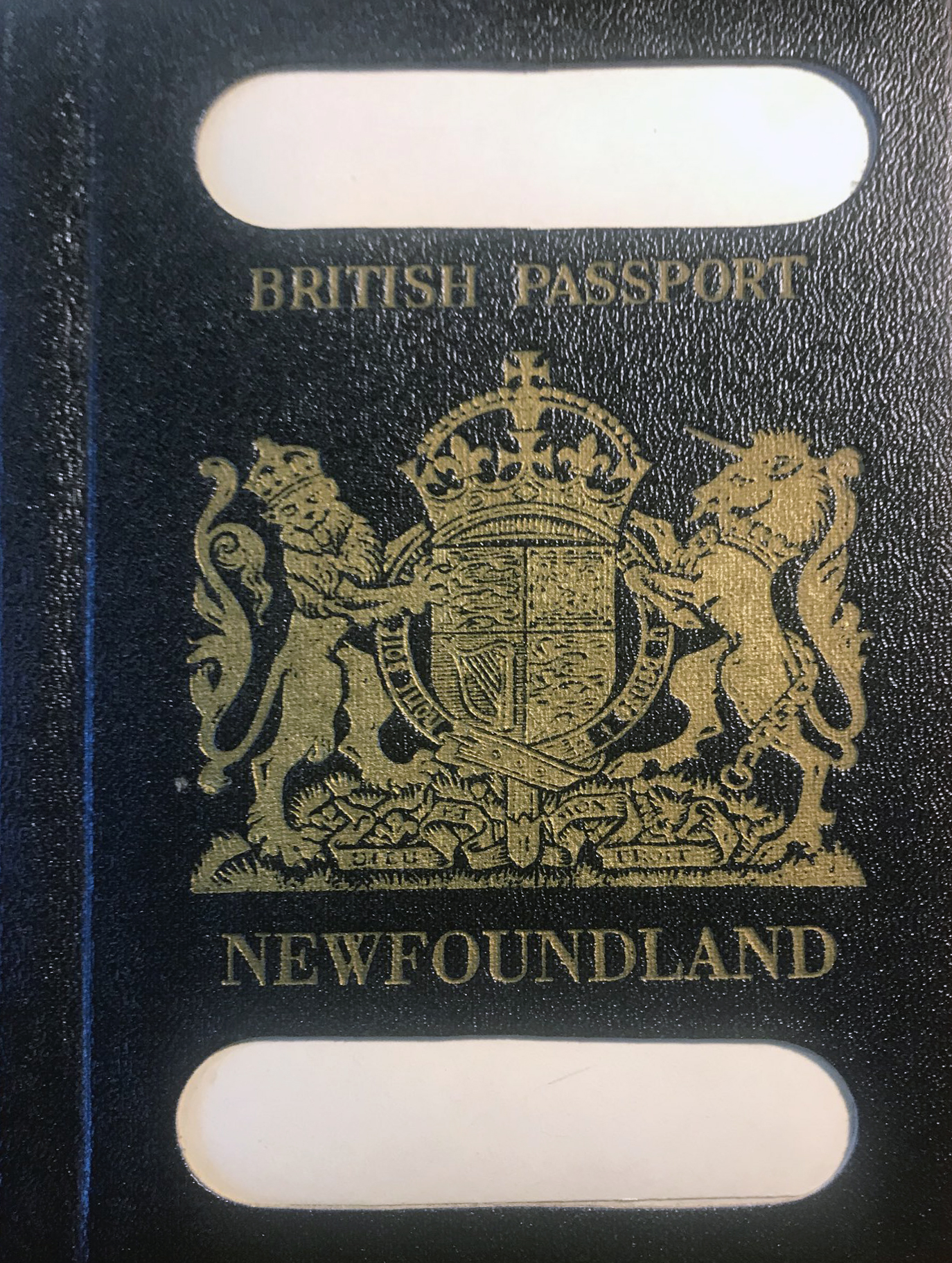
Dominion of Newfoundland passport

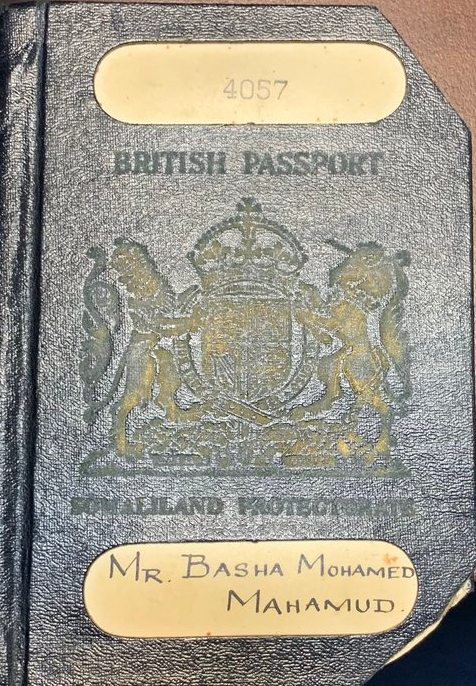
British Somaliland Passport

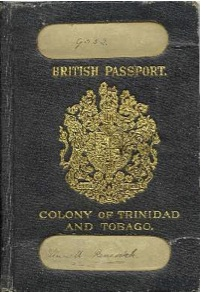
Trinidad and Tobago passport

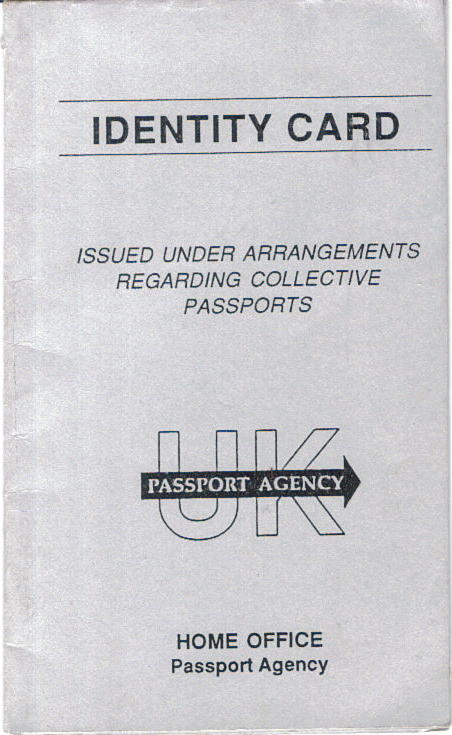
Cardboard identity card issued under arrangements regarding collective passports by the UK Passport Agency in 2001

British Passport 1876

== See also ==
- Visa requirements for British citizens
- Five Nations Passport Group
- Former passports of the European Union
- Passports in Europe
