= Entry certificate =

An entry certificate, under United Kingdom (UK) immigration legislation, is an entry clearance issued to a non-visa national. Certain types of entry to the UK require the person seeking entry to have prior clearance before entering the UK, and because a non-visa national cannot be issued a visa, an entry certificate is issued instead.
