= E-Government in Turkey =

Public services website

e-Devlet
- Available in: Turkish (with limited English support)
- Owners: Directorate of Cybersecurity, Turksat
- Website: turkiye.gov.tr
- Commercial: No
- Users: 68 million (January 2026)
- Launched: 20 April 2008

e-Government in Turkey is the use of digital technology to improve service efficiency and effectiveness in Turkey.

Turkish website e-Devlet kapısı (Turkish: e-government gateway), simply e-devlet (Turkish: e-government) or turkiye.gov.tr, is a resource providing access to government services, with an information portal for foreigners. Users access e-Devlet via their ID number and password or with Identity Cards. In addition to passwords, mobile or digital signature login is available. Internet banking customers can access e-devlet from their banking provider.

== Türkiye.gov.tr project ==
e-Devlet is registered as turkiye.gov.tr internationally. türkiye.gov.tr can be accessed with Turkish characters. "Devletin Kısayolu" (Turkish: Shortcut for government) was introduced in 2008 CeBIT Bilişim Eurasia seminar. On 18 December 2008, it was officially opened by then Prime Minister Recep Tayyip Erdoğan.

As of October 2023, 1,001 government agencies offer 7,415 applications to 63,983,367 million users. The mobile application offers 4,355 services.

== Services ==
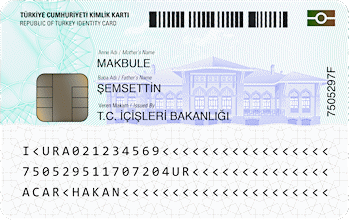
Republic of Turkey Identity Card (reverse)

Available services can be done via the internet without physically going to an office. Services are offered from government agencies, municipality services, universities and individual companies (mostly communication companies). On 14 February 2018, family trees through the 1800s were opened to all citizens. Unexpectedly high demand overwhelmed the system, which shut down for upgrades. A week later, the service re-opened, allowing users to queue for service. This service also surprised some users who have Armenian roots, due to controversial relations between the two countries.

Services include:

- Social security documents
- Forensic clearance
- Address documents
- Tax debts
- Traffic bills
- Mobile telephone number checks
- Deeds
- Student documents
- Family tree
