= Driving licence in Turkey =

Turkish driving licence
- Type: Driving licence
- Issued by: Turkey
- Purpose: Authorisation

Driving licence in Turkey (Turkish: Sürücü belgesi) is a document issued by the relevant government agency, regional or local security force, confirming the holder is qualified to drive motor vehicles. Driving licence exams are regulated by the Ministry of National Education while the licence is issued by the General Directorate of Security.

On 1 January 2016, new laws concerning Turkish driving licences were implemented. The changes are intended to bring Turkey more in line with existing European Union driving regulations and concern all road users in Turkey.

A foreign national can drive in Turkey with an EU licence for six months. After six months, it must be converted to a Turkish licence. Application can be made to any Turkish Population Registry, and the foreign driving licences will not be returned to holders. Instead they will be sent to the issuing authority of the country of origin.

For example, applications made by British licence holders will be sent to the Driver and Vehicle Licensing Agency (DVLA). The DVLA says that expats can drive in the UK on a Turkish licence for up to twelve months, and if they wish to settle in the UK, the Turkish licence cannot be exchanged for a UK licence and a practical test has to be passed.

In Turkey, you must be at least eighteen years old in order to drive a car and at least sixteen to drive a motorbike. The driving test comprises a practical and theory test, which has been recently made tougher in order to meet European Union regulations.

A Turkish driver’s license is considered a valid identification document in Turkey. It is typically issued with a 10-year validity period. If you hold a motorcycle or heavy vehicle license, it will automatically be included in your Turkish driver’s license as well.

== Requirements to attend a driving course ==
In order to take lessons, applicant must fulfill these requirements / bring documents:

- Original and photocopy of Turkish ID card
- Health report (Must be obtained from authorized health institutions)
- Two biometric photos
- Criminal record certificate
- Education Certificate (At least Primary Education Degree required)

== Requirements for Turkish citizens ==
In order to get a licence, applicant must fulfill these requirements / bring documents:

- Drivers Certificate
- Original and photocopy of ID card
- Health Report
- Blood group document
- Two photos, one biometric photo
- Driver's licence card fees
- Criminal record certificate
- Finger print

== Requirements for foreigners ==
Application forms available from the Driver's Association office (Şoförler Odasi) at the local Transport Registration Department. Requirements:

- valid foreign driving licence
- notarised Turkish translation of the driving licence
- copy of the residence permit (Ikamet) or Turkish identification card
- photographs (required at various steps of the process)
- Criminal record certificate which can be obtained from the local court house (valid 12-months from issue)
- Original health report by a local state health centre (Sağlık Ocağı) or private clinic; photos required (valid 12-months from issue)
- Blood group certificate (can be requested from a clinic or health centre)
- Receipt from the tax authorities showing that the relevant driving licence fee has been paid

== Classes ==
Turkish Driving Licence Classes (In use since Jan 01 2016)
| Class | Description | Includes | Valid for | Age | Requirement |
|---|---|---|---|---|---|
| M | Moped | - | 10 years | 16 | |
| A1 | Motorcycles up to 125 cc | M | 10 years | 16 | |
| A2 | Motorcycles up to 35 kW | M - A1 | 10 years | 18 | |
| A | Motorcycles above 35 kW | M - A1 - A2 | 10 years | 24 | Age 24 or 2 years of experience in A2 |
| B1 | Motorcycles (4 wheeled) | M | 10 years | 16 | |
| B | Car / Pickup | M - B1- F | 10 years | 18 | |
| C1 | Truck up to 7500 kg | M - B - B1 - F | 5 years | 18 | At least Class B License |
| C | Truck | M - B - B1 - C1 - F | 5 years | 21 | At least Class B License |
| D1 | Minibus | M - B - B1 - F | 5 years | 21 | At least Class B License |
| D | Bus | M - B - B1 - D1 - F | 5 years | 24 | At least Class B License |
| BE | Car / Pickup (with trailer) | M - B - B1 - F | 10 years | 18 | Class B License |
| C1E | Truck up to 12000 kg (with trailer) | M - B - BE - B1 - C1 - F | 5 years | 18 | Class C1 License |
| CE | Truck (with trailer) | M - B - BE - B1 - C - C1 - C1E - F | 5 years | 21 | Class C License |
| D1E | Minibus (with trailer) | M - B - BE - B1 - D1 - F | 5 years | 21 | Class D1 License |
| DE | Bus (with trailer) | M - B - BE - B1 - D - D1 - D1E | 5 years | 24 | Class D License |
| F | Tractor | M | 10 years | 18 | |
| G | Work vehicle | M | 10 years | 18 | |

== See also ==
- European driving licence
- Turkish identity card
- Turkish passport
- Vehicle registration plates of Turkey
