= General Directorate of Civil Registration and Nationality (Turkey) =

- Nüfus ve Vatandaşlık İşleri Genel Müdürlüğü; NVİ
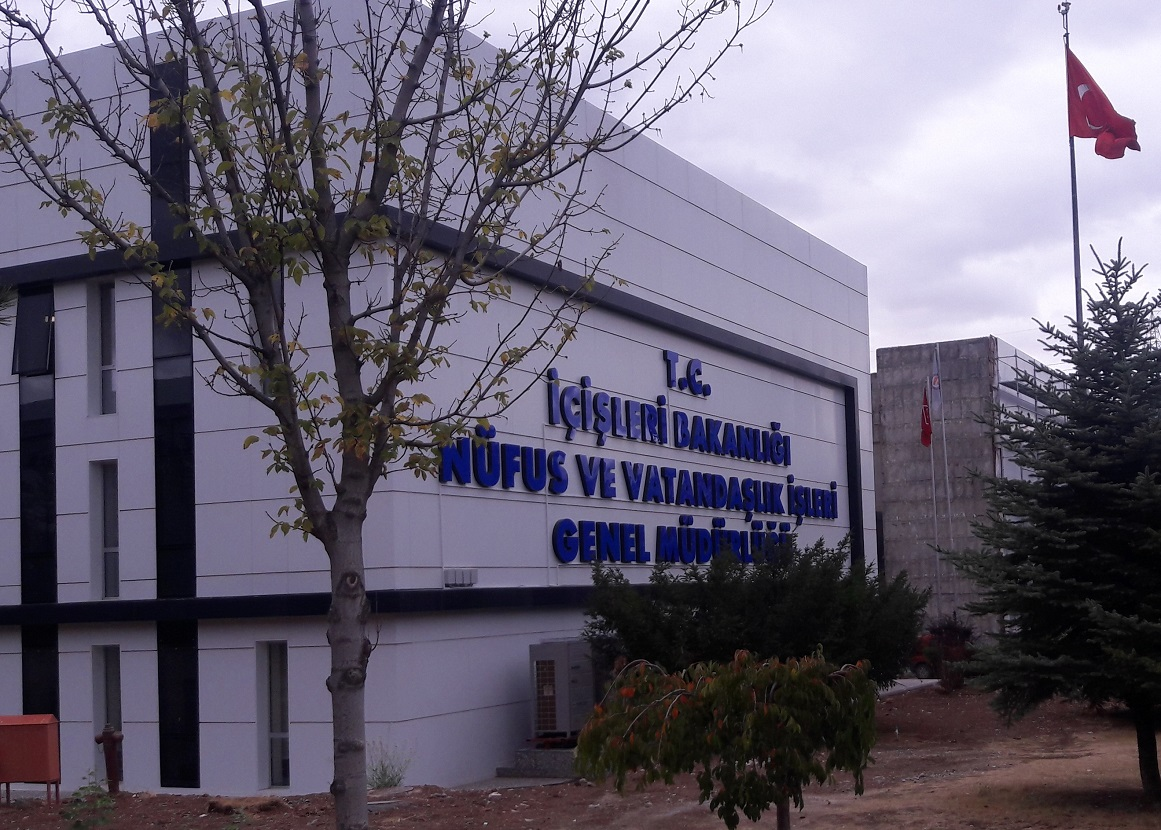
- Headquarters of the Directorate

Agency overview
- Type: Population agency
- Jurisdiction: Presidency of Turkey
- Headquarters: Çamlıca Mahallesi, 408 Cad. No:136, Yenimahalle, Ankara
- Agency executive: İbrahim Taşyapan, Director General
- Parent department: Ministry of the Interior
- Website: www.nvi.gov.tr

The General Directorate of Population and Citizenship Affairs (Turkish: Nüfus ve Vatandaşlık İşleri Genel Müdürlüğü) is the central governmental body in Turkey responsible for formulating population policies in coordination with relevant institutions, based on the structure, characteristics, and trends of the national population. It also monitors and evaluates population movements, implements the Central Population Management System, and develops a national identification number system for Turkish citizens and foreign residents recorded in Turkey, enabling data integration across public institutions. Additionally, the Directorate is tasked with duties assigned by special laws and directives issued by the Ministry. Many of the units of this directorate are gradually providing more digital accessibility.

== Sub-units ==
=== Central Units ===
- Directorate of Address Services
- Directorate of Archive Services
- Directorate of Information Technology
- Directorate of Support Services
- Directorate of Identity Cards
- Directorate of Legislation and Strategy
- Directorate of Population Services
- Directorate of Passport and Driver's License Services
- Directorate of Personnel and Financial Affairs
- Directorate of Citizenship Services

=== Provincial Units ===
- Provincial Directorates of Population and Citizenship Affairs
- District Population Directorates

== See also ==
- Turkish Identification Number
