= Blue Card (Turkey) =

Turkish identity document

- Type: Identity document, equivalent for identity card in Turkey
- Issued by: Turkey
- Purpose: Proof of identity
- Eligibility: Former Turkish citizens and descendants, subject to conditions
- Expiration: Indefinite

The Blue Card (Turkish: Mavi Kart) (Note: Formerly known as the Pink Card (Pembe Kart).) in Turkey is an official identity document, provided to the former Turkish citizens by birth who voluntarily renounced their citizenship with permission, and their lineal descendants up to third-degree. The document is treated as a national identity card in cases where an identity document is required. Blue Card owners can benefit most of the rights afforded to the citizens, and they are not regarded as aliens by the government agencies.

== Rights ==
Blue Card owners can benefit the same rights and duties as Turkish citizens, (Note: Subject to provisions regarding national security and public order) except:

1. The right to vote and stand as a candidate.
2. Importing cars and household goods without customs duty.
3. Obligation of conscription.
4. Being employed as a civil servant. However, one can still be employed by the government under contract.
