= Passports in Europe =

Overview of passports issued in European countries

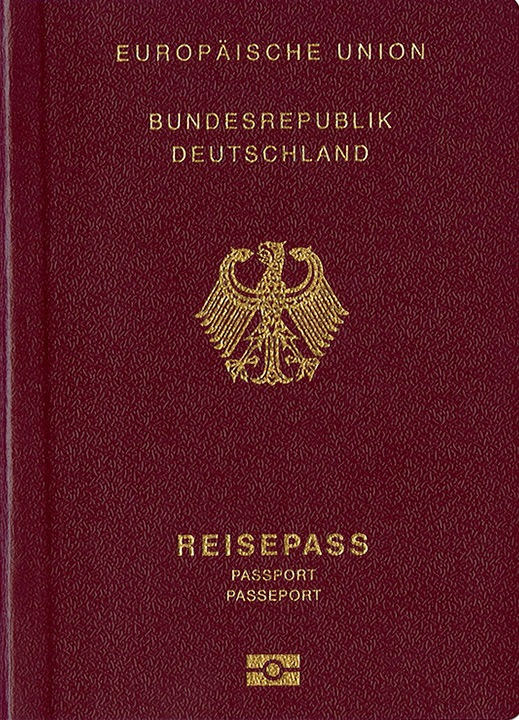
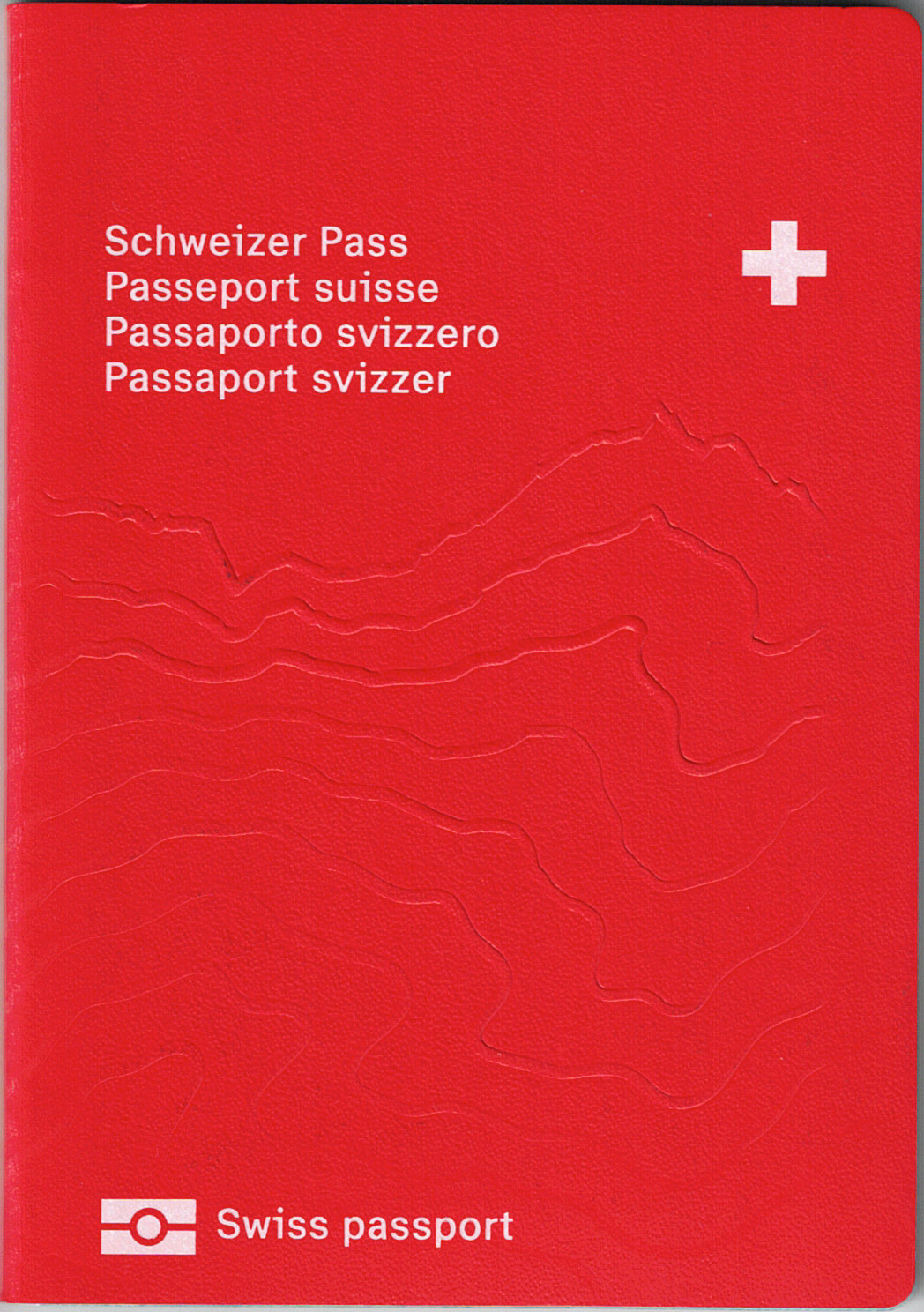
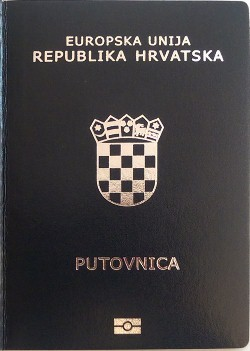
Examples of European biometric passports

Passports in Europe are issued by each state individually, e.g. the Netherlands or Germany. In general, passports issued in Europe either grant the holder the right of freedom of movement within the European Economic Area (EU and EFTA passports), to those that don't (EU candidate countries and other non-EU European states). The majority of European states are members of the European Union, and therefore issue EU passports.

All passports issued in Europe are B7 size and (ISO/IEC 7810 ID-3, 88 mm × 125 mm). The overwhelming majority of European passports are biometric. These include all EU, EFTA, British, and EU candidate passports.

There are also several passports issued by partially-recognised and disputed states, such as the Turkish Republic of Northern Cyprus and Kosovo.

== Passports of the European Union ==
The EU itself does not issue ordinary passports, but ordinary passports issued by the 27 member states follow a common format. This includes a burgundy cover (not compulsory: Croatia is the only exception) emblazoned with the title "European Union", followed by the member state's name in their official language(s) (occasionally translation into English and French), their coat of arms, the word "PASSPORT", together with the biometric passport symbol. Holders of EU passports are citizens of the European Union and entitled to exercise the rights of that citizenship, e.g. freedom of movement.

Some EU member states also issue non-EU passports to certain people who have a nationality which is not supplemented by European Union citizenship (e.g., Danish nationals residing in the Faroe Islands).

In addition, the European Commission issues European Union Laissez-Passers to the members and certain civil servants of its institutions.

Member state	Passport cover	Biodata page	Validity	Issuing authority	Latest version
Austria		Link to image	10 years (aged 12 or over); 5 years (aged 2–11); 2 years (aged 0–2)	Municipal registration offices If abroad, Austrian embassies and consulates	1 December 2023
Belgium		Link to image	7 years (majors aged 18 or over); 5 years (minors aged under 18)	Communes (in Belgium); Belgian embassies and consulates (abroad)	1 May 2014
Bulgaria		Link to image	5 years	Ministry of Interior Affairs	29 March 2010
Croatia		Link to image	10 years (adults aged 21 or over); 5 years (adults aged under 21)	Ministry of the Interior Affairs of the Republic of Croatia	3 August 2015
Cyprus		Link to image	10 years (adults); 5 years (minors)	Civil Registry and Migration Department, Ministry of the Interior; Embassies and High Commissions of the Republic of Cyprus	13 December 2010
Czech Republic		Link to image	10 years (adults aged 15 or over); 5 years (children under 15)	any of the 205 town halls with augmented authority; abroad: consulates of the Czech Republic (except honorary consulates)	1 September 2006
Denmark		Link to image	10 years (adults); 5 years (children under 18)	Kommune (Municipality)	1 January 2012
Estonia		Link to image	10 years (ages 15 and up); 5 years (children under 15)	Police and Border Guard Board (PPA)	1 January 2021
Finland		Link to image	10 years	Police of Finland	1 January 2017
Finland Åland Islands		Link to image	10 years	Police of Åland	1 January 2017
France		Link to image	10 years (adults); 5 years (children under 18)	Préfecture offices (but forms can be addressed to any city hall); French consulates (abroad)	12 April 2006
Germany		Link to image	10 years (aged 24 or over); 6 years (applicants under 24 or second passport)	Municipal registration offices If abroad, German embassies and consulates, including some honorary consulates	2 May 2024
Greece		Link to image	10 years (applicants aged 15 or over); 3 years (children under 15)	National Passport Centre ("Διεύθυνση Διαβατηρίων/Αρχηγείο Ελληνικής Αστυνομίας")	28 August 2006
Hungary		Link to image	5 years; 10 years	Registration Office (Nyilvántartó Hivatal)	1 March 2012
(Republic of Ireland) Ireland		Link to image	10 years (adults); 5 years (children)	Consular and Passport Division of the Department of Foreign Affairs and Trade	3 October 2013
Italy		Link to image	10 years (adults); 5 years (minors aged 3–18); 3 years (children aged 0–3)	Minister of Foreign Affairs through: Local quaestor of the state police (in Italy); Consulates and embassies (abroad)	20 May 2010
Latvia		Link to image	10 years (adults aged 20 or over); 5 years (applicants aged 5–19); 2 years (children under 5)	Office of Citizenship and Migration Affairs (PMLP)	29 January 2015
Lithuania		Link to image	10 years (adults aged 16 or over); 5 years (children aged 5–15); 2 years (children under 5)		27 January 2011
Luxembourg		Link to image	5 years (applicants aged 4 or over); 2 years (applicants under 4)	Bureau des passeports	16 February 2015
Malta	Link to image	Link to image	10 years (applicants aged 16 and over); 5 years (applicants aged 10 to 15); 2 years (applicants under 4)	Passport & Civil Registration Directorate	29 September 2008
Netherlands		Link to image	10 years (applicants aged 18 and over); 5 years (applicants aged under 18)	Gemeente (Municipality); Ministry of Foreign Affairs (Abroad)	23 December 2017
Poland		Link to image	10 years (applicants aged 13 and over); 5 years (applicants aged under 13); 1 year (temporary passport)	Governor of a province (voivodeship); Consul	5 November 2018
Portugal		Link to image	5 years (applicants aged 5 or over); 2 years (children under 5)		10 July 2017
Romania			10 years (applicants aged 18 or over); 5 years (applicants aged 12–18); 3 years (applicants under 12); 1-year (temporary passport)	Ministry of Internal Affairs (General Directorate for Passports)	4 September 2024
Slovakia		Link to image	10 years (adults aged 16 or over); 5 years (children aged 5–15); 2 years (children under 5)	Ministry of Interior	26 November 2014
Slovenia		Link to image		Ministry of the Interior	12 December 2016
Spain		Link to image	10 years (applicants over 30); 5 years (applicants between 5 and 30); 2 years (applicants under 5)	National Police Corps of Spain	2 January 2015
Sweden		Link to image	5 years	Swedish Police Authority (in Sweden); Swedish embassies and consulates (abroad)	1 January 2022

== Passports of European Union candidate countries ==
Since the establishment of the European Economic Community, previous enlargements have seen the founding Inner Six states of 1958 grow to the EU's current 27 member-states. Currently, there are nine recognised candidates for future membership of the EU: Turkey (applied in 1987), North Macedonia (applied in 2004), Montenegro (applied in 2008), Albania (applied in 2009), Serbia (applied in 2009), Bosnia and Herzegovina (applied in 2016), Ukraine (applied in 2022), Moldova (applied in 2022) and Georgia (applied in 2022). All except Bosnia and Herzegovina, and Georgia have started accession negotiations.

Unlike EU and EFTA passports, nationals carrying passports of EU candidate countries do not have free movement rights and are required to possess appropriate visas.

Candidate state	Passport cover	Biodata page	Validity	Issuing authority	Latest version
Albania		Link to image	5 or 10 years	Ministry of the Interior	2015
Bosnia and Herzegovina		Link to image			1 October 2014
(Georgia (country)) Georgia		Link to image			17 August 2016
Moldova		Link to image	10 years (aged 16 or older); 7 years (aged at least 7 and under 16); 4 years (under the age of 7 years)	Agency of public services or Moldovan foreign representations abroad	5 April 2023
Montenegro		Link to image	10 years	Ministry of the Interior	26 February 2021
North Macedonia		Link to image	5 or 10 years (aged 27 and older)	Ministry of the Interior	2019
Serbia		Link to image	10 years(adults); 5 years(minors)	Ministry of the Interior	01 July 2026
Turkey		Link to image	6 months; 1–10 years	Ministry of the Interior	25 August 2022
Ukraine		Link to image	10 years: adults; 4 years: children	State Migration Service (part of the Ministry of Internal Affairs)	1 January 2015

== Passports of EFTA member-states ==
Like the EU, EFTA itself does not issue ordinary passports. It also does not issue any guidelines for a common passport design and format. The EFTA member states participate in the European Single Market and are part of the Schengen Area. EFTA member-states include Iceland, Norway, Switzerland, and Liechtenstein.

In accordance with the EFTA convention, nationals of EFTA member-states enjoy freedom of movement in each other's territory. EFTA nationals also enjoy freedom of movement with the EU. EFTA nationals and EU citizens and are not only visa-exempt but are legally entitled to enter and reside in each other's countries. The right of freedom of movement is defined by the Citizens’ Rights Directive, which defines the right of free movement for citizens of the European Economic Area (EEA), which includes the three EFTA members Iceland, Norway and Liechtenstein and EU member-states. Switzerland, which is a member of EFTA but not of the EEA, is not bound by the Directive but rather has a separate bilateral agreement on free movement with the EU.

Member state	Passport cover	Biodata page	Validity	Issuing authority	Latest version
Iceland		Link to image	10 years (adults); 5 years (under 18)	Registers Iceland (Þjóðskrá Íslands)	1 February 2019
Liechtenstein		Link to image	10 years adults and children over 12; 5 years minors under 12	Ausländer- und Passamt	26 October 2006
Norway		Link to image	2 years (aged 0–4); 3 years (aged 5–9); 5 years (aged 10–15); 10 years (aged 16 and older)	Norwegian Police Service	19 October 2020
Switzerland		Link to image	10 years (aged 18 or over); 5 years (aged 0–17)	Canton passport office (Federal Office of Police)	31 October 2022

== British passports ==
Following the end of the UK's EU withdrawal transition period on 31 December 2020, British passports no longer grant holders the right to free movement within the EEA. British passports are issued to all types of British nationals. These include British Nationals (Overseas), British Overseas Territories Citizens (BOTCs), and British citizens resident in the Crown Dependencies.

The UK also participates in the Five Nations Passport Group, along with Canada, Australia, New Zealand, and the US.

In Europe, British passports are issued to British citizens, BOTCs in Gibraltar, and British citizens resident in the Crown Dependencies (Jersey, Guernsey, and the Isle of Man).

Country	Passport cover	Biodata page	Validity	Issuing authority	Latest version
United Kingdom	British Passport 2025	Link to image	10 years (aged 16 or over); 5 years (under 16)	HM Passport Office	December 2025
Isle of Man			10 years (aged 16 or over); 5 years (under 16)	HM Passport Office	March 2020
Jersey	Jersey Passport (Blue)		10 years (aged 16 or over); 5 years (under 16)	HM Passport Office	June 2020
Guernsey	Guernsey Passport (Blue)		10 years (aged 16 or over); 5 years (under 16)	HM Passport Office	June 2020
Gibraltar			10 years (aged 16 or over); 5 years (under 16)	Gibraltar Civil Status and Registration Office	October 2015

== Other European passports ==
Member state	Passport cover	Biodata page	Validity	Issuing authority	Latest version
Armenia		Link to image	10 years (adults)	Migration and Citizenship Service	16 July 2012
Azerbaijan		Link to image	1 year: children under age of 1 3 years: children under age of 3 5 years: children under age of 18 10 years: Adults	Ministry of Internal Affairs	1 September 2013
Belarus		Link to image	10 years	Ministry of Internal Affairs	15 May 2006
Faroe Islands		Link to image	10 years: adults 5 years: children	Faroe Islands Police	1 January 2012
Kazakhstan		Link to image	10 years	Ministry of Internal Affairs	1 January 2009
Kosovo		Link to image	10 years: Adult 5 years: Child	Ministry of Internal Affairs	1 January 2013
Sovereign Military Order of Malta	Link to image	Link to image			
Monaco		Link to image	5 years	Minister of State	26 October 2005
Northern Cyprus			5 years	Ministry of Interior	2024
Russia		Link to image	10 years	Ministry of Internal Affairs	1 March 2010
San Marino		Link to image	10 years: over 14 5 years: aged 3–14 3 years: under 3	Secretariat of State for Foreign Affairs	12 October 2006
(Holy See) Vatican City			5 years	Governorate of Vatican City State	1 October 2020

== See also ==
- Visa requirements for European Union citizens
- Citizenship of the European Union
- National identity cards in the European Economic Area
- Passports of the EFTA member states
- Passports of European Union candidate states
- Five Nations Passport Group
- Visa policy in the European Union
- Schengen Area
- European Union laissez-passer
- British Passport
