= Turkish Citizenship by Investment =

Turkish immigration program

Turkish Citizenship By Investment (TCBI) is an immigrant investor program launched in January, 2017. Participants are required to either purchase real estate worth at least US$400,000 and hold it for 3 years, or to deposit US$500,000 in a bank in Turkey (or invest in bonds, fixed capital contributions, etc.) for a period of 3 years. Participants can also qualify by purchasing an under-construction real estate provided it meets the program's requirements. Upon investing as above and duly submitting citizenship application, a Turkish passport is typically granted in several months or up to a year. As of 2015, approximately one quarter of all nation-states issued such "golden visas, of which approximately half as of 2023 were Turkish. It is the most popular such program in the world.

In October 2024 the opposition İYİ Parti (Good Party) filed lawsuits to revoke such citizenships, claiming an existential demographic crisis for Turkey, there being at least half a million citizens under the program.

In August 2026, Turkish Ministry of Internal Affairs announced that citizenships of 6,134 individuals who acquired it through the programme were revoked due to detected fraudulent activities.

== See also ==
- Turkish nationality law
- Turkish passport
- Immigrant investor programs
- Immigration to Turkey
- Immigration to Europe
