= Turkish nationality law =

Turkish Citizenship Act

Grand National Assembly of Turkey
- Long title: An act relating to Turkish citizenship
- Enacted by: Government of Turkey
- Status: Current legislation

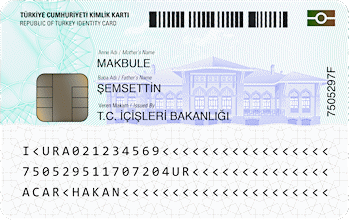
Turkish identity card back side

Turkish nationality law is based primarily on the principle of jus sanguinis. Children who are born to a Turkish mother or a Turkish father (in or out of marriage) are Turkish citizens from birth. The intention to renounce Turkish citizenship (or acquire citizenship from another state) is submitted in Turkey by a petition to the highest administrative official in the concerned person's place of residence, and when overseas to the Turkish consulate. Documents processed by these authorities are forwarded to the Ministry of Interior (Turkey) for appropriate action.

== Definition of citizenship ==
Citizenship is defined in Article 66 of the Turkish constitution:

- Everyone bound to the Turkish state through the bond of citizenship is a Turk.
- The child of a Turkish parent is a Turk.
- Citizenship can be acquired under the conditions stipulated by law, and shall be forfeited only in cases determined by law.
- No Turk shall be deprived of citizenship, unless he/she commits an act incompatible with loyalty to the homeland.
- Recourse to the courts in appeal against the decisions and proceedings related to the deprivation of citizenship, shall not be denied.

— 1982 constitution., Article 66 (as amended on October 17, 2001)

== Adoption ==
A child adopted by a Turkish citizen automatically becomes a Turkish citizen if under 18 years old on the date the application for adoption was made. In some cases (although it is not required), those who have foreign names and are applying for Turkish citizenship change their name to a Turkish name. Examples of people who have done this include football players Colin Kazim-Richards and Mehmet Aurélio.

== Loss of citizenship ==
There are three different states of loss of citizenship in Turkey. They are either: cancellation, revocation, or renunciation.

- Loss of citizenship in Turkey may occur under Article 31 (Cancellation) where the national in question has misrepresented or concealed essential information in regards to his acquisition of Turkish nationality, Turkish nationality also may be revoked (Article 29) or renounced (Article 25), under the Turkish Citizenship Law (No: 12/6/2009 27256).

== Blue Card ==
Former Turkish citizens who were forced to give up their Turkish citizenship (for example, because they have naturalized in a country that usually does not permit dual citizenship, such as Austria) can apply for the Blue Card (Mavi Kart), which gives them some citizens' rights back, e.g. the right to live and work in Turkey, the right to possess land or the right to inherit. Excluded from this "Citizenship lite" is the right to vote.

== Naturalization ==
Cover of biometric Turkish passport

A foreign national may apply for naturalization if the following conditions are met:

- Legal majority as defined by the laws of the applicant's country of origin or those of Turkey in the case of stateless persons,
- Residence in Turkey for an uninterrupted period of five years prior to the application,
- Intention to settle in Turkey and demonstration thereof,
- No risk to public health,
- Good moral character,
- Adequate command of the Turkish language,
- Sufficient income for his or her own livelihood and that of any dependants in Turkey,
- No threat to national security or public order.

Meeting these conditions does not give a foreign national an absolute right to Turkish citizenship.

A foreign national who has been married to a Turkish citizen for three years and is still married to that partner may apply for naturalization under a different set of conditions:

- Residence with the Turkish spouse (exceptions granted if the Turkish spouse dies after application is lodged),
- Absence of acts jeopardising the marriage,
- No threat to national security or public order.

Following a successful application, the naturalised spouse may retain their Turkish citizenship if the marriage should subsequently be dissolved, so long as both partners had entered into the marriage in good faith.

== Citizenship by Investment ==
Since 18 September 2018, Law No 5901 disposes that foreign citizens investing in Turkey will be granted the right to apply for Turkish citizenship.

Foreigners who meet any of the following criteria may be eligible for Turkish citizenship:

- Made a minimum fixed capital investment of US$500,000 or equivalent foreign currency or Turkish lira, as attested by the Ministry of Industry and Technology,
- Acquired a property worth a minimum of $400,000 or equivalent foreign currency or Turkish lira with a title deed restriction on its resale for at least three years, as attested by the Ministry of Environment and Urbanisation and Climate Change.
- Created jobs for at least 50 people, as attested by the Ministry of Family, Labor and Social Services,
- Deposited at least $500,000 or equivalent foreign currency or Turkish lira in banks operating in Turkey with the condition not to withdraw the same for at least three years, as attested by the Banking Regulation and Supervision Agency,
- Bought at least $500,000 or equivalent foreign currency or Turkish lira worth of government bonds with the condition that they cannot be sold for at least three years, as attested by the Ministry of Treasury and Finance,
- Bought at least $500,000 or equivalent foreign currency or Turkish lira worth of real estate investment fund share or venture capital investment fund share with the condition that they cannot be sold for at least three years, as attested by the Capital Markets Board of Turkey
- The most important provisions of this law are that all financial transactions for the purchase of property through Turkish banks, and cannot accept transactions such as cash.
- It is also not possible to buy a property from any foreign person (non-Turkish).
- According to the amended law, the property cannot be sold during the first three years of the purchase.

Additionally, the applicant and those family members to be included in the application (children under 18 and the spouse of the applicant can be included) must have a clear criminal background that will be checked by the internal authorities within the Ministry of Interior although a clean-background document is not necessary.

Applicants must submit documents issued in their name that shows their name and surname, the names of their father and mother, city of their birth, date of their birth, their identification/passport numbers, their marital status (marriage books if married, documents if divorced or widowed) and other main details about themselves. Financial declarations nor criminal background check documents are required.

The Turkish Citizenship by Investment Program does not have a pre-approval system that many Caribbean citizenship programs have but also the program's application requirements are easier and approval ratings are higher.

The investment made and claimed by the foreign national is monitored and confirmed by the relevant government authority. Once the investment is confirmed by the relevant governmental authority, the foreign national is granted Turkish citizenship.

In August 2026, Turkish Ministry of Internal Affairs announced that citizenships of 6,134 individuals who acquired it through the programme were revoked due to detected fraudulent activities.

== Dual citizenship ==
Dual citizenship is possible in Turkish law.

The laws of Turkey provide for acquisition of Turkish citizenship based on one's descent—by birth to a Turkish citizen parent (or parents) in Turkey and also by birth abroad to a Turkish citizen parent (or parents)—regardless of the other nationalities a person might acquire at birth. Children born in Turkey to foreign citizens do not have a claim to Turkish citizenship, unless one of the parents is also a Turkish citizen or the child would otherwise be stateless. The automatic acquisition (or retention) of a foreign nationality does not affect Turkish citizenship. Turkish laws have no provisions requiring citizens who are born with dual nationality to choose one nationality over the other when they become adults.

While recognizing the existence of dual nationality and permitting Turkish citizens to have other nationalities, the Turkish government requires that those who apply for another nationality inform the relevant Turkish authority (the nearest Turkish embassy or consulate abroad) and provide the original naturalisation certificate, Turkish birth certificate, document attesting to completion of military service (for males), marriage certificate (if applicable) and four photographs. Dual nationals are not required to use a Turkish passport to enter and leave Turkey; it is permitted to travel with a valid foreign passport (or national ID card for some nationals) and the Turkish National ID card.

Since not all countries allow dual citizenship, Turks must sometimes give up their Turkish citizenship in order to naturalise as citizens of another country.

== Visa requirements for Turkish citizens ==
Visa requirements for holders of Turkish ordinary passports Republic of Turkey Visa not required Visa on arrival eVisa Visa available both on arrival or online Visa required

Visa requirements for holders of Turkish special, service and diplomatic passports Republic of Turkey Visa not required for special, service and diplomatic passport holders Visa not required for diplomatic passport holders Visa required

As of 2024, Turkish citizens had visa-free or visa on arrival access to 118 countries and territories, ranking the Turkish passport 52nd in the world according to the Henley Passport Index.

Turkey is the only EU candidate country whose citizens are still required visas for their travels to the European Union member countries. However the European Union is planning to introduce visa free travel for Turkish citizens as well as the United States lists Turkey as an aspiring country for inclusion to the Visa Waiver Program.

=== International travel using Turkish identity card ===
Turkish citizens can also use their identity cards in lieu of a Turkish passport to travel to the following countries under bilateral agreements that have been concluded between the Turkish Government and governments of the respective countries:

Countries	Stay
Azerbaijan (Note: Only if arriving directly from Turkey.)	90 days
Georgia	90 days
Moldova	90 days
Northern Cyprus	90 days
Ukraine	90 days

== Turkish Republic of Northern Cyprus ==
Turkey also provides a special sort of "passport for foreigners" to citizens of the Turkish Republic of Northern Cyprus, to enable them to travel freely, as this country is generally not recognized and the local passports are not accepted as valid travel documents in some countries.

Citizens of Turkish Republic of Northern Cyprus are also entitled to become citizens of Turkey if they wish and apply to do so. They are exempt from the above criteria. The only criterion is that they are born Turkish Cypriots, i.e., of a Turkish Cypriot mother or father.

== See also ==
- Turkish Identification Number
- Turkish passport
- Human rights in Turkey
