= Visa requirements for Turkish citizens =

Entry restrictions by the authorities of other states placed on citizens of Turkey

Turkish passport

Visa requirements for Turkish citizens are administrative entry restrictions by the authorities of other states placed on citizens of Turkey.

There are four types of Turkish passports: Ordinary passport, Special passport, Service passport, and Diplomatic passport.

== Visa requirements map ==
=== Visa requirements for Turkish ordinary passport holders ===
Visa requirements for holders of Turkish ordinary passports Republic of Türkiye Freedom of movement ID card travel Visa not required / ETA (Note: ETA required for Kenya, Mexico if arriving by air, Saint Kitts and Nevis, Seychelles and South Korea) Visa not required (conditional) Visa on arrival eVisa Visa available both on arrival or online Visa required

As of 2026, Turkish citizens had visa-free or visa on arrival access to 112 countries and territories, ranking the Turkish passport 45th in the world according to the Henley Passport Index.

Turkey is the only EU candidate country whose citizens still require visas for their travels to the European Union member countries.

Turkish passport, along with the Russian passport, is the highest ranking ordinary passport whose holders are still required visas for their travels to the European Union, the United States, the United Kingdom, and Canada.

=== Visa requirements for Turkish special, service, and diplomatic passport holders ===
Visa requirements for holders of Turkish special, service, and diplomatic passports Republic of Turkey Visa not required for special, service, and diplomatic passport Visa not required for diplomatic passport Visa required

Special passport holders can travel 158 destinations, plus Schengen area. Also these 3 type of passports placed 16th on the world rank. Only holders of diplomatic passports are exempt from visa requirements when traveling to the United Kingdom, Ireland, and India. Apart from ordinary passports, the other 3 passport types offered are special, service, and diplomatic passport types.

All special passport holders can travel to all Schengen area countries without a visa. Special passports are also offered to different professional groups that meet certain conditions, especially public employees.

== Visa requirements for ordinary passport holders ==
Country	Visa requirement	Allowed stay	Notes (excluding departure fees)
Afghanistan	Visa required		
Albania	Visa not required	90 days	
Algeria	Visa required		Persons may be denied entry if entering with a passport containing visas or stamps issued by Israel.; Visitors on tours organized to some southern regions by an approved travel agency may obtain a visa on arrival for up to 30 days.
Andorra	Visa required	90 days	Because this landlocked country has no airport of its own, you need to arrive in France or Spain first and visas are required to enter into these countries.
Angola	Visa not required	30 days	30 days per trip, but no more than 90 days within any 1 calendar year for tourism purposes only.; Visitors must have a return/onward ticket and a hotel reservation confirmation.; An International Certificate of Vaccination is required.
Antigua and Barbuda	Visa not required	180 days	
Argentina	Visa not required	90 days	
Armenia	eVisa / Visa on arrival	120 days	
Australia	Visa required		May apply online (Online Visitor e600 visa).
Austria	Visa required		May transit through airside without a visa.
Azerbaijan	Visa not required	90 days	ID card valid.; If staying more than 15 days, visitors staying outside hotels must register with local police.
Bahamas	Visa not required	8 months	
Bahrain	eVisa / Visa on arrival	14 days	
Bangladesh	Visa on arrival	30 days	
Barbados	Visa not required	6 months	
Belarus	Visa not required	30 days	
Belgium	Visa required		Holders of Turkish ordinary passports who hold a valid visa for a Member State of the European Economic Area, Canada, Japan, Switzerland or the United States or; hold a valid residence permit issued by a Member State of the European Economic Area and Switzerland or; hold a residence permit issued by Andorra, Canada, Japan, Republic of San Marino, or the United States, that guarantees unrestricted right of return or; are a family member of a citizen of the EEA member or Switzerland or; are a flight crew may be exempt from the airport transit visa requirement.
Belize	Visa not required	90 days	
Benin	eVisa	30 days	Must have an international vaccination certificate.; Three types of electronic visa are offered: the e-Visa valid for 30 days for a single entry (50 EUR), the e-Visa valid for 30 days for several (multiple) entries (75 EUR), and the e-Visa valid for 90 days to make several (multiple) entries (100 EUR).
Bhutan	eVisa	90 days	The Sustainable Development Fee (SDF) of 200 USD per person, per night for almost all visitors to Bhutan. Additionally, if payment is made in US dollars from September 1, 2023 to August 31, 2027, the SDF is 100 USD.
Bolivia	Visa not required	90 days	
Bosnia and Herzegovina	Visa not required	90 days	90 days within any 6-month period.
Botswana	Visa not required	90 days	
Brazil	Visa not required	90 days	
Brunei	Visa not required	30 days	
Bulgaria	Visa required		May transit through airside without a visa.
Burkina Faso	eVisa		
Burundi	Online Visa / Visa on arrival	1 month	
Cambodia	eVisa / Visa on arrival	30 days	
Cameroon	eVisa		
Canada	Visa required		Permanent residents of the United States are not required a visitor visa for Canada.
Cape Verde	Visa required		
Central African Republic	Visa required		
Chad	eVisa		
Chile	Visa not required	90 days	
China	Visa required		Single-person tourist visas are not issued.; 24-hour visa-free transit through any international airports of China (except Ürümqi), allows domestic travel through different airports. (Note: Custom procedure for 24-hour visa-free transit is required in principle, except in Beijing (both Capital and Daxing), Shanghai Pudong, Hangzhou, Xiamen, Guangzhou, Shenzhen, Chengdu Tianfu and Xi'an if no leaving of international transit areas.)
Colombia	Visa not required	90 days	90 days - extendable up to 180-day stay within a 1-year period.
Comoros	Visa on arrival	45 days	
Republic of the Congo	Visa required		
Democratic Republic of the Congo	eVisa	7 days	
Costa Rica	Visa not required	90 days	
Côte d'Ivoire	eVisa	3 months	e-Visa holders must arrive via Port Bouet Airport.
Croatia	Visa required		May transit through airside without a visa.
Cuba	eVisa	90 days	Can be extended up to 90 days with a fee.
Cyprus	Visa required		Holders of Turkish ordinary passports who hold a valid visa for a Member State of the European Economic Area, Canada, Japan, Switzerland or the United States or; hold a valid residence permit issued by a Member State of the European Economic Area and Switzerland or; hold a residence permit issued by Andorra, Canada, Japan, Republic of San Marino, or the United States, that guarantees unrestricted right of return or; are a family member of a citizen of the EEA member or Switzerland or; are a flight crew may be exempt from the airport transit visa requirement.
Czech Republic	Visa required		Holders of Turkish ordinary passports who hold a valid visa for a Member State of the European Economic Area, Canada, Japan, Switzerland or the United States or; hold a valid residence permit issued by a Member State of the European Economic Area and Switzerland or; hold a residence permit issued by Andorra, Canada, Japan, Republic of San Marino, or the United States, that guarantees unrestricted right of return or; are a family member of a citizen of the EEA member or Switzerland or; are a flight crew may be exempt from the airport transit visa requirement.
Denmark	Visa required		May transit through airside without a visa.; Turkish citizens who are residing and employed in Turkey, and who can be designated as a service provider, can enter Denmark without a visa if the purpose of the stay in Denmark is to provide a service of short duration.
Djibouti	eVisa	90 days	
Dominica	Visa not required	21 days	
Dominican Republic	Visa not required	90 days	
Ecuador	Visa not required	90 days	
Egypt	Visa on arrival		Visa not required when travelling as part of the tourist group that consists of at least 10 persons.; Visa may be granted on arrival for 25 USD.
El Salvador	Visa not required	3 months	
Equatorial Guinea	Visa not required	90 days	
Eritrea	Visa required		
Estonia	Visa required		May transit through airside without a visa.
Eswatini	Visa not required	30 days	
Ethiopia	eVisa / Visa on arrival	90 days	e-Visa holders must arrive via Addis Ababa Bole International Airport.
Fiji	Visa not required	4 months	
Finland	Visa required		May transit through airside without a visa.
France	Visa required		Holders of Turkish ordinary passports who hold a valid visa for a Member State of the European Economic Area, Canada, Japan, Switzerland or the United States or; hold a valid residence permit issued by a Member State of the European Economic Area and Switzerland or; hold a residence permit issued by Andorra, Canada, Japan, Republic of San Marino, or the United States, that guarantees unrestricted right of return or; are a family member of a citizen of the EEA member or Switzerland or; are a flight crew may be exempt from the airport transit visa requirement.
Gabon	eVisa	90 days	e-Visa holders must arrive via Libreville International Airport.
Gambia	Visa not required	90 days	
Georgia	Visa not required	360 days	ID card valid.
Germany	Visa required		Holders of Turkish ordinary passports who hold a valid visa for a Member State of the European Economic Area, Canada, Japan, Switzerland or the United States or; hold a valid residence permit issued by a Member State of the European Economic Area and Switzerland or; hold a residence permit issued by Andorra, Canada, Japan, Republic of San Marino, or the United States, that guarantees unrestricted right of return or; are a family member of a citizen of the EEA member or Switzerland or; are a flight crew may be exempt from the airport transit visa requirement.
Ghana	Visa required		
Greece	Visa required		May transit through airside without a visa.; Simplified visa for 7 days for the following islands: Chios, Lesbos, Rhodes, Samos, Kos, Kastellorizo, Lemnos, Leros, Kalymnos, Symi, Patmos, Samothrace. (Note: The policy shall be applied until April 2026 and is subject to daily quota.)
Grenada	Visa required		
Guatemala	Visa not required	90 days	
Guinea	eVisa	90 days	
Guinea-Bissau	Visa on arrival	90 days	
Guyana	eVisa		
Haiti	Visa not required	90 days	
Honduras	Visa not required	3 months	
Hungary	Visa required		
Iceland	Visa required		May transit through airside without a visa.
India	Visa required		May transit through airside without a visa.
Indonesia	Visa not required / e-VOA	30 days	
Iran	Visa not required	3 months	
Iraq	Visa not required (conditional) / eVisa	30 days	Visitors under 15 years of age and over 50 years of age can stay for 30 days without a visa.; An entry visa is issued for a 15-day stay if arriving through Erbil International Airport or Sulaymaniyah International Airport. Valid in Iraqi Kurdistan Region only.; Visitors may apply for an e-Visa (30 days) to visit the Iraqi Kurdistan Region.; Those entering the country via Kurdistan may be considered to have crossed into central Iraq illegally, even if they have valid visas or visa exemptions.
Ireland	Visa required		May transit without a visa.; National visa may be substituted with a UK C visa holders. Entry permitted only if first point of entry to the Common Travel Area is in the UK.
Israel	Visa required		Visa may be issued free of charge to Turkish citizens at Israeli diplomatic missions.
Italy	Visa required		May transit through airside without a visa.
Jamaica	Visa not required	90 days	
Japan	Visa not required	90 days	
Jordan	Visa not required	3 months	
Kazakhstan	Visa not required	30 days	
Kenya	Electronic Travel Authorisation	90 days	Applications can be submitted up to 90 days prior to travel and must be submitted at least 3 days in advance.; eTA fee is 32.50 USD.; Proof of reservation at the hotel where visitors plan to stay is required (if staying with friends, an invitation letter is also acceptable).; Yellow fever vaccination certificate is required if coming from endemic countries.
Kiribati	Visa required		
North Korea	Visa required		
South Korea	Electronic Travel Authorization	90 days	The validity period of a K-ETA is 3 years from the date of approval.
Kuwait	eVisa / Visa on arrival	3 months	
Kyrgyzstan	Visa not required	90 days	
Laos	eVisa / Visa on arrival	30 days	
Latvia	Visa required		May transit through airside without a visa.
Lebanon	Free visa on arrival	1 month	Extendable for 1 additional month.; Granted free of charge at Beirut International Airport or any other port of entry if there is no Israeli visa or seal, holding a telephone number, an address in Lebanon and a non refundable return or circle trip ticket.
Lesotho	Visa required		
Liberia	e-VOA	3 months	
Libya	Visa not required (conditional) / eVisa		Visitors under 16 years of age and over 55 years of age can enter without a visa.; Persons with passports indication previous travel to Israel will be denied entry to Libya.
Liechtenstein	Visa required		
Lithuania	Visa required		May transit through airside without a visa.
Luxembourg	Visa required		May transit through airside without a visa.
Madagascar	eVisa / Visa on arrival	90 days	For stays of 61 to 90 days, the visa fee is 59 USD.
Malawi	eVisa	30 days	
Malaysia	Visa not required	3 months	
Maldives	Free visa on arrival	30 days	
Mali	Visa required		
Malta	Visa required		May transit through airside without a visa.
Marshall Islands	Visa on arrival	90 days	
Mauritania	eVisa	30 days	Available at Nouakchott–Oumtounsy International Airport.
Mauritius	Visa not required	90 days	
Mexico	Electronic Authorization System	180 days	Only available for ordinary passport holders when entering by air.; Holders of Turkish special (green) and service (grey) passports must apply in the nearest consular office of Mexico for the corresponding stamped visa.; Free of change and usually granted instantaneously.; 180 days visa-free if holding a valid visa for Canada, Japan, the USA, the United Kingdom or a Schengen member state.
Micronesia	Visa not required	30 days	
Moldova	Visa not required	90 days	90 days within any 180 day period.; ID card valid
Monaco	Visa required		
Mongolia	Visa not required	30 days	
Montenegro	Visa required		Visa required from November 1, 2026.; Holders of travel documents with a valid Schengen visa, a valid visa from the United States, the United Kingdom of Great Britain and Northern Ireland, or the Republic of Ireland, as well as residence permits from those countries, may enter and stay in, or transit through, the territory of Montenegro for up to 30 days, but no longer than the expiration of their visa if the validity period is shorter than 30 days.
Morocco	Visa not required	3 months	
Mozambique	eVisa / Visa on arrival	30 days	
Myanmar	eVisa	28 days	e-Visa holders must arrive via Yangon, Nay Pyi Taw or Mandalay airports or via land border crossings with Thailand — Tachileik, Myawaddy and Kawthaung or India — Rih Khaw Dar and Tamu.; e-Visa is available for tourism only.
Namibia	eVisa / Visa on arrival	3 months / 90 days	
Nauru	Visa required		
Nepal	Online Visa / Visa on arrival	90 days	
Netherlands	Visa required		Holders of Turkish ordinary passports who hold a valid visa for a Member State of the European Economic Area, Canada, Japan, Switzerland or the United States or; hold a valid residence permit issued by a Member State of the European Economic Area and Switzerland or; hold a residence permit issued by Andorra, Canada, Japan, Republic of San Marino, or the United States, that guarantees unrestricted right of return or; are a family member of a citizen of the EEA member or Switzerland or; are a flight crew may be exempt from the airport transit visa requirement.
New Zealand	Visa required		Holders of an Australian Permanent Resident Visa or Resident Return Visa may be granted a New Zealand Resident Visa on arrival permitting indefinite stay (pursuant to the Trans-Tasman Travel Arrangement), subject to meeting character requirements and obtaining an Electronic Travel Authority prior to departure.
Nicaragua	Visa not required	90 days	
Niger	Visa required		
Nigeria	eVisa	30 days	
North Macedonia	Visa not required	90 days	
Norway	Visa required		Holders of Turkish ordinary passports who hold a valid visa for a Member State of the European Economic Area, Canada, Japan, Switzerland or the United States or; hold a valid residence permit issued by a Member State of the European Economic Area and Switzerland or; hold a residence permit issued by Andorra, Canada, Japan, Republic of San Marino, or the United States, that guarantees unrestricted right of return or; are a family member of a citizen of the EEA member or Switzerland or; are a flight crew may be exempt from the airport transit visa requirement.
Oman	Visa not required	30 days	Mutual visa exemption between Oman and Türkiye.
Pakistan	eVisa	3 months	
Palau	Free visa on arrival	30 days	
Panama	Visa not required	90 days	
Papua New Guinea	eVisa	60 days	Visitors may apply for a visa online under the "Tourist - Own Itinerary" category.
Paraguay	Visa not required	90 days	
Peru	Visa not required	183 days	
Philippines	Visa not required	30 days	
Poland	Visa required		May transit through airside without a visa.
Portugal	Visa required		May transit through airside without a visa.
Qatar	Visa not required	90 days	
Romania	Visa required		May transit through airside without a visa.
Russia	eVisa	30 days	
Rwanda	eVisa / Visa on arrival	30 days	
Saint Kitts and Nevis	Electronic Travel Authorisation	3 months	
Saint Lucia	Visa not required	6 weeks	
Saint Vincent and the Grenadines	Visa not required	3 months	
Samoa	Entry permit on arrival	90 days	
San Marino	Visa required		
São Tomé and Príncipe	Visa not required	15 days	
Saudi Arabia	eVisa / Visa on arrival	90 days	
Senegal	Visa on arrival	1 month	
Serbia	Visa not required	90 days	90 days within any 180-day period.; ID card valid.
Seychelles	Electronic Border System	3 months	Application can be submitted up to 30 days before travel.; Visitors must upload a reservation confirmation(s) for each visitor's location of stay in Seychelles.; Yellow fever vaccination certificate is required if coming from endemic countries.; Payment of the fee (EUR 10) by credit or debit card.; Valid for one journey only and it expires once exit the country.
Sierra Leone	eVisa / Visa on arrival	3 months / 30 days	
Singapore	Visa not required	30 days	
Slovakia	Visa required		May transit through airside without a visa.
Slovenia	Visa required		May transit through airside without a visa.
Solomon Islands	Visa required		
Somalia	eVisa	30 days	All visitors must have an approved Electronic Visa (eTAS) before the start of their journey.
South Africa	Visa not required	30 days	
South Sudan	eVisa		Obtainable online 30 days single entry for 100 USD, 90 days multiple entry for 200 USD and 180 days multiple entry for 350 USD.; Printed visa authorization must be presented at the time of travel.
Spain	Visa required		Holders of Turkish ordinary passports who hold a valid visa for a Member State of the European Economic Area, Canada, Japan, Switzerland or the United States or; hold a valid residence permit issued by a Member State of the European Economic Area and Switzerland or; hold a residence permit issued by Andorra, Canada, Japan, Republic of San Marino, or the United States, that guarantees unrestricted right of return or; are a family member of a citizen of the EEA member or Switzerland or; are a flight crew may be exempt from the airport transit visa requirement.
Sri Lanka	ETA / Visa on arrival	30 days	Sri Lanka introduced an ETA valid for 30 days.
Sudan	Visa on arrival	1 month	Only if arriving directly from Turkey.
Suriname	Visa not required	90 days	An entrance fee of USD 50 or EUR 50 must be paid online prior to arrival.; Multiple entry e-Visa is also available.
Sweden	Visa required		May transit through airside without a visa.
Switzerland	Visa required		Holders of Turkish ordinary passports who hold a valid visa for a Member State of the European Economic Area, Canada, Japan, Switzerland or the United States or; hold a valid residence permit issued by a Member State of the European Economic Area and Switzerland or; hold a residence permit issued by Andorra, Canada, Japan, Republic of San Marino, or the United States, that guarantees unrestricted right of return or; are a family member of a citizen of the EEA member or Switzerland or; are a flight crew may be exempt from the airport transit visa requirement.
Syria	Visa not required	90 days	50 USD entry fee.
Tajikistan	Visa required		
Tanzania	eVisa / Visa on arrival	90 days	
Thailand	Visa not required	60 days	
Timor-Leste	Visa on arrival	30 days	
Togo	eVisa	15 days	
Tonga	Visa on arrival	31 days	
Trinidad and Tobago	Visa not required	90 days	
Tunisia	Visa not required	3 months	
Turkmenistan	Visa required		10-day visa on arrival if holding a letter of invitation provided by a company registered in Turkmenistan with a prior approval from the Foreign Ministry. Visitors can apply to extend their stay for an additional 10 days.; When transiting between two non-bordering countries, visitors can obtain a Turkmenistan transit visa for a five-day stay. This must be applied for in advance at the Turkmenistan Embassy. Visitors must also submit copies of the visas for the country of entry into Turkmenistan and the country of departure from Turkmenistan. Visa fee is 20 USD.
Tuvalu	Visa on arrival	1 month	
Uganda	eVisa	3 months	Determined at the port of entry.
Ukraine	Visa not required	90 days	90 days within any 180-day period.; ID card valid.
United Arab Emirates	Visa required		May apply using 'Smart service'.
United Kingdom	Visa required		Turkish citizens who hold a valid entry visa for Australia, Canada, New Zealand or the United States, and a valid airline ticket for travel via the United Kingdom, as part of a journey to or from one of those countries and/or are permanent residents of the European Economic Area, Australia, Canada, New Zealand, Switzerland and the United States do not need a Direct Airside Transit visa or Visitor in Transit visa.
United States	Visa required		Tourist visas are issued with validity of up to 10 years.
Uruguay	Visa not required	90 days	
Uzbekistan	Visa not required	30 days	
Vanuatu	Visa not required	120 days	
Vatican City	Visa required		
Venezuela	Visa not required	90 days	
Vietnam	eVisa		Phú Quốc without a visa for up to 30 days.
Yemen	Visa required		Yemen introduced an e-Visa system for visitors who meet certain eligibility requirements (group travel of 10 or more people, business trips, and transit etc.).
Zambia	Visa not required	90 days	
Zimbabwe	eVisa / Visa on arrival	1 month	

=== Dependent, disputed, or restricted territories ===
Visa requirements for Turkish citizens for visits to various territories, disputed areas, partially recognized countries and restricted zones:

Africa

- Eritrea (outside Asmara) — Visa covers Asmara only; to travel in the rest of the country, a Travel Permit for Foreigners is required (20 Eritrean nakfa).
- Sahrawi Arab Democratic Republic (Western Sahara controlled territory) — Visa not required up to 3 months.
- Somaliland — Visa issued on arrival (30 days for 30 USD, payable on arrival also permission from the federal government of Somalia is required).
- Sudan — All foreigners traveling more than 25 kilometers outside of Khartoum must obtain a travel permit.
- (Sudan) Darfur — Separate travel permit is required.

Asia

- Hong Kong — Visa not required for 90 days.
- India — Protected Area Permit (PAP) required for whole states of Nagaland and Sikkim and parts of states Mizoram, Manipur, Arunachal Pradesh, Uttaranchal, Jammu and Kashmir, Rajasthan, Himachal Pradesh. Restricted Area Permit (RAP) required for all of Andaman and Nicobar Islands and parts of Sikkim. Some of these requirements are occasionally lifted for a year.
- Kazakhstan — Special permission required for the town of Baikonur and surrounding areas in Kyzylorda Oblast, and the town of Gvardeyskiy near Almaty.
- (Iran) Kish Island — Visitors to Kish Island do not require a visa.
- Macao — Visa not required for 30 days.
- (Malaysia) Sabah and Sarawak — These states have their own immigration authorities and passport is required to travel to them, however the same visa applies.
- North Korea outside Pyongyang – People are not allowed to leave the capital city, tourists can only leave the capital with a governmental tourist guide (no independent moving)
- Palestine — Visa not required. Arrival by sea to Gaza Strip not allowed.
- (Saudi Arabia) Mecca and Medina — Non-Muslims and those following the Ahmadiyya religious movement are strictly prohibited from entry.
- Taiwan — eVisa.
- (Tajikistan) Gorno-Badakhshan Autonomous Province — OIVR permit required (15+5 Tajikistani Somoni) and another special permit (free of charge) is required for Lake Sarez.
- Turkmenistan — A special permit, issued prior to arrival by Ministry of Foreign Affairs, is required if visiting the following places: Atamurat, Cheleken, Dashoguz, Serakhs and Serhetabat.
- (China) Tibet Autonomous Region — Tibet Travel Permit required (10 US Dollars).

- (United Nations) Korean Demilitarized Zone — restricted zone.
- (United Nations) UNDOF Zone and Ghajar — restricted zones.
- (Vietnam) Phú Quốc — can visit without a visa for up to 30 days.
- Yemen — Special permission needed for travel outside Sanaa or Aden.

Caribbean and North Atlantic

- Anguilla — eVisa - Possible to visit with a multiple entry Canada, USA or United Kingdom visa.
- Aruba — Visa required - Possible to visit with a multiple entry Schengen visa or an EU residence permit.
- (Netherlands) Bonaire, St. Eustatius and Saba — Visa required - Possible to visit with a multiple entry Schengen visa or an EU residence permit.
- Bermuda — Visa required - Possible to visit with a multiple entry US, UK or Canada visa.
- British Virgin Islands — Visa not required - 30 days.
- Cayman Islands — Visa required. Possible to visit with US Green Card if arriving directly from USA.
- Colombia — Visitors arriving at San Andrés must buy tourist cards on arrival.
- Curacao — Visa required - Possible to visit with a multiple entry Schengen visa or an EU residence permit .
- Montserrat — Visa required - eVisa Application Possible. Possible to visit with a multiple entry EU Member State, Canada or USA visa.
- Greenland — Visa required.
- (Venezuela) Margarita Island — All visitors are fingerprinted.
- Puerto Rico — Visa required - Possible to visit with a multiple entry US visa
- Saint Barthelemy — Visa required - Possible to visit with a multiple entry Schengen visa or an EU residence permit.
- Saint Martin — Visa required - Possible to visit with a multiple entry Schengen visa or an EU residence permit.
- Saint Pierre and Miquelon — Visa required. Possible to visit with a multiple entry Schengen visa or an EU residence permit.
- Sint Maarten — Visa required - Possible to visit with a multiple entry Schengen visa or an EU residence permit.
- Turks and Caicos Islands — Visa not required
- U.S. Virgin Islands — Visa required - Possible to visit with a multiple entry US visa

Europe

- Abkhazia — Visa required. Tourists from all countries (except Georgia) can visit Abkhazia for a period not exceeding 24 hours as part of an organized tourist group.
- Mount Athos — Special permit required (4 days: 25 EUR for Orthodox visitors, 35 EUR for non-Orthodox visitors, 18 EUR for students). There is a visitors' quota: maximum 100 Orthodox and 10 non-Orthodox per day and women are not allowed.
- Republic of Crimea — Visa regime of Russia is applied.
- Turkish Republic of Northern Cyprus — unlimited access;. ID card valid
- (United Nations) UN Buffer Zone in Cyprus — Access Permit is required for travelling inside the zone, except Civil Use Areas.
- Faroe Islands — Visa required.
- Gibraltar — Visa required.
- Guernsey – Visa required.
- (Guernsey) Alderney – Visa required.
- (Guernsey) Sark – Visa required.
- Isle of Man — Visa required.
- (Norway) Jan Mayen — Permit issued by the local police required for staying for less than 24 hours and permit issued by the Norwegian police for staying for more than 24 hours.
- Jersey – Visa required.
- Kosovo — Visa free for 90 days.
- Closed cities and regions in Russia — special authorization required.
- South Ossetia — Visa required. To enter South Ossetia, visitors must have a multiple-entry visa for Russia and register their stay with the Migration Service of the Ministry of Internal Affairs within 3 days.
- Transnistria — Visa free. Registration required after 24h.

Oceania

- American Samoa — Visa required (entry permit).
- (Australia) Ashmore and Cartier Islands — special authorisation required.
- (France) Clipperton Island — special permit required.
- Cook Islands — Visa free access for 31 days.
- Lau Province — Special permission required. If you are traveling to the Lau group of islands by yacht, you need special permission from your first port of entry into Fiji.
- French Polynesia — Visa required.
- Guam — Visa required.
- New Caledonia — Visa required.
- Niue — Visa on arrival valid for 30 days is issued free of charge.
- Northern Mariana Islands — Visa required.
- Pitcairn Islands — 14 days visa free and landing fee US$35 or tax of US$5 if not going ashore.
- Tokelau — Visa required (entry permit).
- United States Minor Outlying Islands — special permits required for Baker Island, Howland Island, Jarvis Island, Johnston Atoll, Kingman Reef, Midway Atoll, Palmyra Atoll and Wake Island.
- Wallis and Futuna — Visa required. Possible to visit with a multiple entry Schengen visa or an EU residence permit.

South America

- Galápagos — 60 days; Visitors must pre-register to receive a 20 USD Transit Control Card (TCT).

South Atlantic and Antarctica

- Falkland Islands — Visa required.
- Saint Helena, Ascension and Tristan da Cunha
  - Ascension Island — eVisa for 3 months within any year period.
  - Saint Helena — eVisa.
  - Tristan da Cunha — Permission to land required for 15/30 pounds sterling (yacht / ship passenger) for Tristan da Cunha Island or 20 pounds sterling for Gough Island, Inaccessible Island or Nightingale Islands.
- South Georgia and the South Sandwich Islands — Pre-arrival permit from the Commissioner required (72 hours / 1 month for 110/160 pounds sterling).
- Antarctica and adjacent islands — special permits required for French Southern and Antarctic Lands, Argentine Antarctica, (Australia) Australian Antarctic Territory, (Antártica Chilena Province) Chilean Antarctic Territory, (Australia) Heard Island and McDonald Islands, (Norway) Peter I Island, (Norway) Queen Maud Land, (New Zealand) Ross Dependency.
- Arab League — Certain countries will deny access to holders of Israeli visas or passport stamps of Israel because of the Arab League boycott of Israel.

== Consular protection of Turkish citizens abroad ==
Map of countries with Turkish representations

Turkey has the 3rd largest diplomatic network in the world with 252 diplomatic and consular missions.

== Non-visa restrictions ==
=== Blank passport pages ===
Many countries require a minimum number of blank pages to be available in the passport being presented, typically one or two pages. Endorsement pages, which often appear after the visa pages, are not counted as being valid or available.

=== Vaccination ===
Cover of the new International Certificate of Vaccination issued by the Bureau of Quarantine in the Philippines since 2021

The African countries of Angola, Benin, Burkina Faso, Burundi, Cameroon, Central African Republic, Democratic Republic of the Congo, Republic of the Congo, Côte d'Ivoire, Gabon, Ghana, Guinea-Bissau, Mali, Niger, Sierra Leone and Togo, South Sudan and Uganda, along with French Guiana in South America, require all incoming passengers older than nine months to one year, to have a current International Certificate of Vaccination or Prophylaxis.

Some other countries require vaccination only if the passenger is coming from an infected area or has visited one recently or has transited for 12 hours in those countries: Algeria, Botswana, Cabo Verde, Chad, Djibouti, Egypt, Eswatini, Ethiopia, Gambia, Ghana, Guinea, Lesotho, Libya, Equatorial Guinea, Eritrea, Madagascar, Malawi, Mauritania, Mauritius, Mozambique, Namibia, Nigeria, Papua New Guinea, Seychelles, Somalia, South Africa, Sudan, Tunisia, Uganda, Tanzania, Zambia and Zimbabwe.

=== Passport validity length ===
Very few countries, such as Paraguay, just require a valid passport on arrival.

However many countries and groupings now require only an identity card – especially from their neighbours. Other countries may have special bilateral arrangements that depart from the generality of their passport validity length policies to shorten the period of passport validity required for each other's citizens or even accept passports that have already expired (but not been cancelled).

Some countries, such as Japan, Ireland and the United Kingdom, require a passport valid throughout the period of the intended stay.

In the absence of specific bilateral agreements, countries requiring passports to be valid for at least 6 more months on arrival include Afghanistan, Algeria, Anguilla, Bahrain, Bhutan, Botswana, British Virgin Islands, Brunei, Cambodia, Cameroon, Cape Verde, Cayman Islands, Central African Republic, Chad, Comoros, Costa Rica, Côte d'Ivoire, Curaçao, Ecuador, Egypt, El Salvador, Equatorial Guinea, Fiji, Gabon, Guinea Bissau, Guyana, Haiti, India, Indonesia, Iran, Iraq, Israel, Jordan, Kenya, Kiribati, Kuwait, Laos, Madagascar, Malaysia, Marshall Islands, Mongolia, Myanmar, Namibia, Nepal, Nicaragua, Nigeria, Oman, Palau, Papua New Guinea, Peru, Philippines, Qatar, Rwanda, Samoa, Saudi Arabia, Singapore, Solomon Islands, Somalia, Sri Lanka, Sudan, Suriname, Tanzania, Thailand, Timor-Leste, Tokelau, Tonga, Turkey, Tuvalu, Uganda, United Arab Emirates, Vanuatu, Venezuela, and Vietnam.

Countries requiring passports valid for at least 4 months on arrival include Micronesia and Zambia.

Countries requiring passports with a validity of at least 3 months beyond the date of intended departure include Azerbaijan, Bosnia and Herzegovina, Honduras, Montenegro, Nauru, Moldova and New Zealand. Similarly, the EEA countries of Iceland, Liechtenstein, Norway, all European Union countries (except Ireland) together with Switzerland also require 3 months validity beyond the date of the bearer's intended departure unless the bearer is an EEA or Swiss national.

Countries requiring passports valid for at least 3 months on arrival include Albania, North Macedonia, Panama, and Senegal.

Bermuda requires passports to be valid for at least 45 days upon entry.

Countries that require a passport validity of at least one month beyond the date of intended departure include Eritrea, Hong Kong, Lebanon, Macau, the Maldives and South Africa.

==== Maximum passport age ====
Countries of the Schengen area require non-EU passports to be less than 10 years old upon entry.

=== Criminal record ===
Some countries, including Australia, Canada, Fiji, New Zealand and the United States, routinely deny entry to non-citizens who have a criminal record, while others impose restrictions depending on the type of conviction and the length of the sentence.

=== Persona non grata ===
The government of a country can declare a diplomat persona non grata, banning them from entering the country or expelling them if they have already entered. In non-diplomatic use, the authorities of a country may also declare a foreigner persona non grata permanently or temporarily, usually because of unlawful activity.

=== Israeli stamps ===
Kuwait, Lebanon, Libya, and Yemen do not allow entry to people with passport stamps from Israel or whose passports have either a used or an unused Israeli visa, or where there is evidence of previous travel to Israel such as entry or exit stamps from neighbouring border posts in transit countries such as Jordan and Egypt.

To circumvent this Arab League boycott of Israel, the Israeli immigration services have now mostly ceased to stamp foreign nationals' passports on either entry to or exit from Israel (unless the entry is for some work-related purposes). Since 15 January 2013, Israel no longer stamps foreign passports at Ben Gurion Airport. Passports are still (as of 22 June 2017) stamped at Erez when passing into and out of Gaza.

Iran refuses admission to holders of passports containing an Israeli visa or stamp that is less than 12 months old.

=== Biometrics ===
Several countries mandate that all travellers, or all foreign travellers, be fingerprinted on arrival and will refuse admission to or even arrest travellers who refuse to comply. In some countries, such as the United States, this may apply even to transit passengers who merely wish to change planes rather than go landside.

Fingerprinting countries/regions include Afghanistan, Argentina, Brunei, Cambodia, China, Ethiopia, Ghana, Guinea, India, Japan, Kenya (both fingerprints and a photo are taken), Malaysia upon entry and departure, Mongolia, Saudi Arabia, the Schengen Area, Singapore, South Korea, Taiwan, Thailand, Uganda, the United Arab Emirates and the United States.

Many countries also require a photo be taken of people entering the country. The United States, which does not fully implement exit control formalities at its land frontiers (although long mandated by its own legislation), intends to implement facial recognition for passengers departing from international airports to identify people who overstay their visa.

Together with fingerprint and face recognition, iris scanning is one of three biometric identification technologies internationally standardised since 2006 by the International Civil Aviation Organization (ICAO) for use in e-passports and the United Arab Emirates conducts iris scanning on visitors who need to apply for a visa. The United States Department of Homeland Security has announced plans to greatly increase the biometric data it collects at US borders. In 2018, Singapore began trials of iris scanning at three land and maritime immigration checkpoints.

== See also ==
- Turkish passport
- Visa policy of Turkey
- Foreign relations of Turkey
