= Turkish Identification Number =

Identification number for Turkish citizens

Turkish Identification Number (Turkish: Türkiye Cumhuriyeti Kimlik Numarası or abbreviated as T.C. Kimlik No.) is a unique personal identification number that is assigned to every citizen of Turkey.

Foreigners residing in Turkey at least six months for any purpose receive a Foreigner Identification Number, which is different from the Turkish Identification Number.

== Purpose ==
The purpose of identification number's introduction is to resolve the problems that arise by same names of different citizens and to speed up the information transfer between the public institutions. With the identification number, services like taxation, security, voting, education, social security, health care, military recruitment, banking and many others can be carried out more quickly, rationally and reliably.

== History ==
The Turkish Identification Number was introduced on October 28, 2000 in conjunction with the Act No. 3080, which amended the initial Population Registration Act No. 1587, and applied to all citizens born after 1840, dead or alive around 120 million people at that time. It was issued by the 923 registration offices at district level across the country.

From January 1, 2003 on, all public institutions integrated the personal identification number in their certificates and documents like identity card, passport, international family book, driving license, form and manifesto they issue to citizens. The Identity Card Serial Number formerly in use was not needed any more and so cancelled.

== MERNİS Project ==
Turkish Identification Number was developed and put in service in context of a project called Central Registration Administration System (Turkish: Merkezi Nüfus İdaresi Sistemi, abbreviated as MERNİS).

The idea for the project was born in 1972 after the Population Registration Law was enacted. Following infrastructural works done by the State Planning Organization and later by the Middle East Technical University, the World Bank financially supported the project in 1996 with credit.

The cost of the project amounted to US$35 million. Personal data of 70 million Turkish citizens, 5 million Turks living abroad and 24 million dead were recorded in a databank with the help of the personal identification number using a special software that was developed for US$400,000. Moreover, 23 million records of married, divorced and naturalized people were added giving identification number.

After accomplishment of the initial issue of the personal identification number, it is being given only to newborns and naturalized people.

The MERNİS database is in online service since the end of November 2002, however not fully open to the public for secrecy of private data. However leaked copies of the database have surfaced following a security breach by staff who sold copies on DVD in 2010, and which became widely available on the internet via peer-to-peer file sharing services in early 2016.

== Identification number ==
The identification number is a unique 11-digit number given by the MERNİS computer on the basis of the citizen's registration record that is kept by the registration office. The number does not reflect any personal information about the citizen. It is not possible to change the identification number once applied.

== Query of the identification number ==
The identification number can be obtained by the registration offices or online at internet via the Ministry of Interior's portal.

== See also ==
- National identification number
- Turkish nationality law
- Turkish identity card
- Turkish passport
- Visa policy of Turkey
- Visa requirements for Turkish citizens
