= Turkish passport =

Passport of the Republic of Türkiye issued to Turkish citizens

Turkish passport; Türk pasaportu
- The front cover of a current Turkish biometric passport
- Type: Passport
- Issued by: (Turkey) Ministry of the Interior
- First issued: 1 June 2010 (1st generation biometric passport); 1 April 2018 (2nd generation biometric passport); 25 August 2022 (3rd generation biometric passport)
- Purpose: Identification, international travel
- Valid in: All countries
- Eligibility: Turkish or Turkish Cypriot citizenship
- Expiration: 10 years (5 years if under 18 years of age or if is a Turkish Cypriot)
- Cost: ₺14.761,40

The Turkish passport (Turkish: Türk pasaportu) is issued to Turkish citizens for travel outside Turkey as per the Passport Act dated July 15, 1950. Citizens of the de facto state of Northern Cyprus are also eligible to apply for a Turkish passport. Passports issued since 1 June 2010 are biometric and valid for up to 10 years.

== Types ==
- Ordinary passport (Turkish: Umuma mahsus pasaport), also referred to as the Maroon Passport (Bordo pasaport). It is issued to Turkish citizens who do not qualify for any of the following passport types.
- Special passport (Hususi pasaport), also referred to as the Green Passport (Yeşil pasaport), allows the bearer to travel visa-free to European countries (except the UK and Ireland), some 67 countries, including but not limited to Ivory Coast, China, the Philippines. As opposed to the regular passport, it is exempt from the passport fee and is only subject to the booklet fee (₺1135). It is issued to:
  - First, Second or Third grade public servants.
  - Retired First, Second or Third grade public servants.
  - Non-metropolitan Mayors
  - Academics and lawyers with at least 15 years of experience
  - The spouse of special passport holders
  - Single and unemployed children of special passport holders under the age of 25 living with their parents.
- Service passport (Hizmet pasaportu), also referred to as the Grey Passport (Gri pasaport). It is issued to:
  - People who do not qualify for the Special or diplomatic passports, however, are assigned to travel abroad for official and/or government related purposes.
  - National athletes
  - Turkish citizens working for international organisations of which Turkey is a member
  - Staff members of the Turkish Red Crescent
  - Employees of the Turkish Aeronautical Association
  - Spouse of the service passport holders
  - Unwed and unemployed children of the service passport holders who live with parents, until they turn 25.
- Diplomatic passport (Diplomatik pasaport), also referred to as the Black Passport (Siyah pasaport). Diplomatic passports are issued to diplomats, cabinet ministers and other government officials in positions of the utmost importance to national security and the operation of government. See below for a complete list of individuals eligible for a diplomatic passport:

Eligible individuals
Title	The nature of importance
The President of Turkey	Executive
Members of the Grand National Assembly of Turkey	Legislative
Cabinet Ministers	Executive
Constitutional Court members	Judicial
Supreme Court of Appeals members	Judicial
Council of State members	Judicial
Court of Jurisdictional Disputes members	Judicial
Court of Accounts members	Judicial
Chief of the General Staff	Military
Deputy Chief of the General Staff	Military
Chief Public Prosecutor	Judicial
Full Generals	Military
Full Admirals	Military
Former Presidents	Executive
Former Speakers of Legislative Assemblies	Legislative
Former Prime Ministers	Executive
Former Foreign Ministers	Diplomatic
Secretary-General of the Presidency	Executive
Undersecretaries of the Prime Ministry and Ministries	Executive
Head of the Directorate of Religious Affairs	Religious
Individuals with the title of Ambassador	Diplomatic
Professional members of the Ministry of Foreign Affairs	Diplomatic
Senior officials of the Presidency General Secretariat sent on official missions	Diplomatic
Advisers appointed at the representations of the Republic of Turkey abroad	Diplomatic
Attachés appointed at the representations of the Republic of Turkey abroad	Diplomatic
Assistants appointed at the representations of the Republic of Turkey abroad	Diplomatic
Individuals sent to conduct international official negotiations on behalf of the Government	Diplomatic
Individuals sent to contract treaties	Diplomatic
Individuals sent to attend international meetings, congresses, and conferences	Diplomatic
Political couriers	Diplomatic

Diplomatic passports can also be issued to the spouses, minor children, or children who are adults but living with them, unmarried, unemployed, and continuing their education until the age of 25, as well as adult children living with them, unmarried, unemployed, and in need of constant care due to at least one of physical, mental, or emotional disabilities as documented by an official health institution report, for as long as the eligibility of the person holding the diplomatic passport continues. Diplomatic passports are not subject to any stamp duty or tax.

== Visa requirements map ==
=== Visa requirements for Turkish ordinary passport holders ===
Visa requirements for holders of Turkish ordinary passports Republic of Türkiye ID card travel Visa not required Visa on arrival eVisa Visa available both on arrival or online Visa required

As of 2026, Turkish citizens have visa-free or visa on arrival access to 113 countries and territories, ranking the Turkish passport 45th in the world according to the Henley Passport Index.

Turkey is the only EU candidate country whose citizens are still required visas for their travels to the European Union member countries.

Turkish passport, along with the Russian passport, is the highest ranking ordinary passport whose holders are still required visas for their travels to the European Union, the United States, the United Kingdom, and Canada.

=== Visa requirements for Turkish special, service, and diplomatic passport holders ===
Visa requirements for holders of Turkish special, service, and diplomatic passports Republic of Turkey Visa not required for special, service, and diplomatic passport Visa not required for diplomatic passport Visa required

Apart from ordinary passports, the other three passport types offered are special, service, and diplomatic passport types. All three types of non-ordinary Turkish passports are exempted from visa requirements for travel to the Schengen area. Special passport holders can travel to 158 destinations, plus the Schengen area. Also these three types of passports placed 16th on the world rank. Only diplomatic passport holders are exempted from visa requirements for their travels to the United Kingdom, the Republic of Ireland, and India.

=== International travel using Turkish identity card ===
Turkish citizens can use their identity cards in lieu of a Turkish passport to travel to the following countries under bilateral agreements that have been concluded between the Turkish Government and governments of the respective countries:

Countries	Stay
Azerbaijan (Note: Only if arriving directly from Turkey.)	90 days
Georgia	90 days
Moldova	90 days
North Cyprus	30 days
Ukraine	90 days
Bosnia and Herzegovina	90 days
Serbia	90 days

== Biometric passport ==
Turkish biometric passport, compatible with the new ICAO standards, have been available since 1 June 2010. Application appointments for the new passports can be reserved online through the government's website, applications must be lodged in person.

== Multiple passports ==
People with valid reasons may be allowed to hold more than one passport. This usually applies to people who travel frequently for business and may need a passport to travel while the other person is waiting for a visa to another country. Some Muslim-majority countries, such as Lebanon, Syria, Kuwait, Iran, Iraq, Pakistan, Saudi Arabia, Sudan, and Yemen, do not issue visas to visitors who have an Israeli stamp or visa in their passport. In this case, the person can apply for a second passport to avoid travel problems.

== Gallery ==
=== Current passports ===
Turkish ordinary passport (Umuma mahsus pasaport)

Turkish special passport (Hususi pasaport)

Turkish service passport (Hizmet pasaportu)

Turkish diplomatic passport (Diplomatik pasaport)

=== Historic passports ===
Listed chronologically:

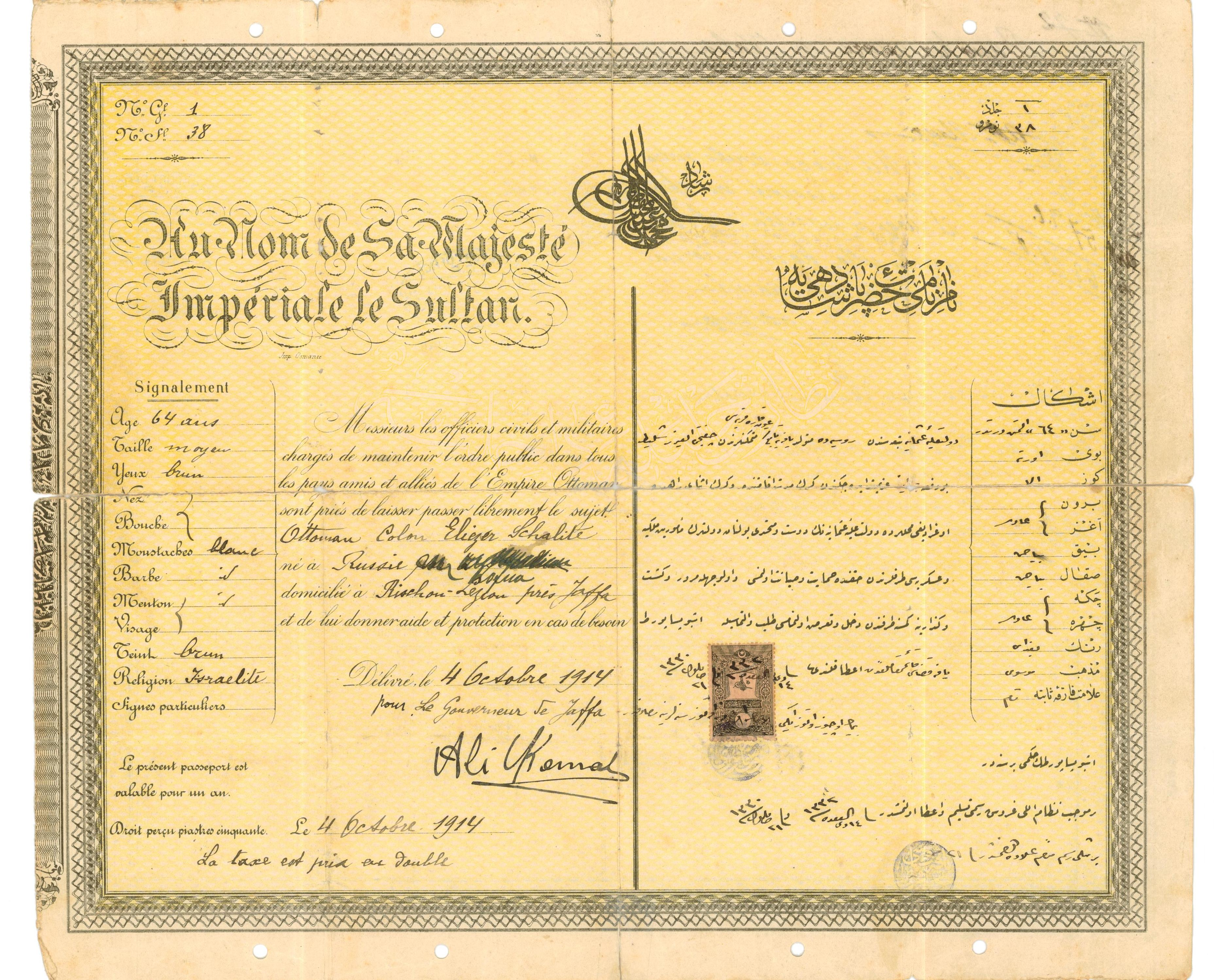
1914 Turkish Ottoman passport issued in Jaffa

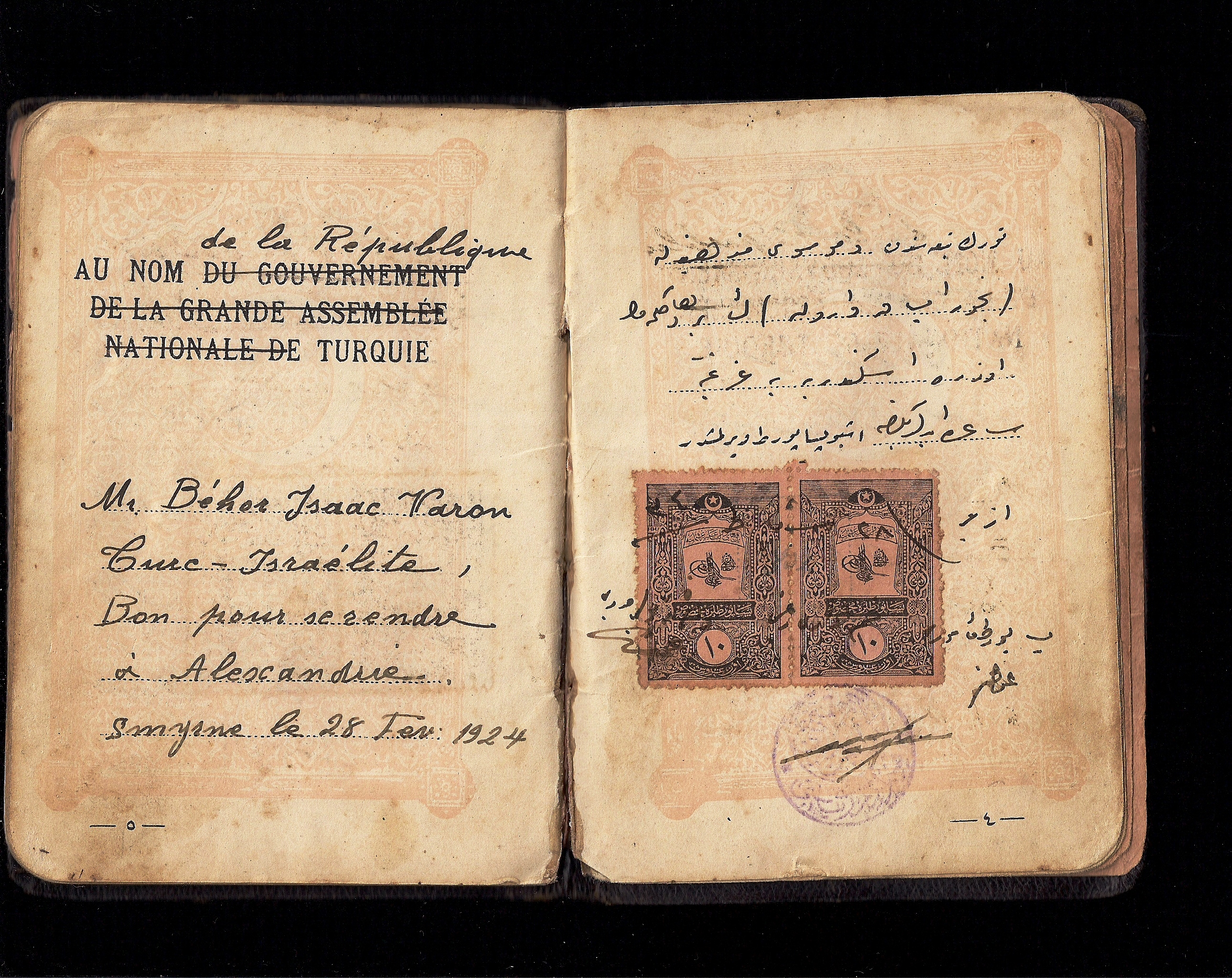
1924 Turkish passport issued in İzmir

1927 - Republic of Turkey, Regular passport, cover

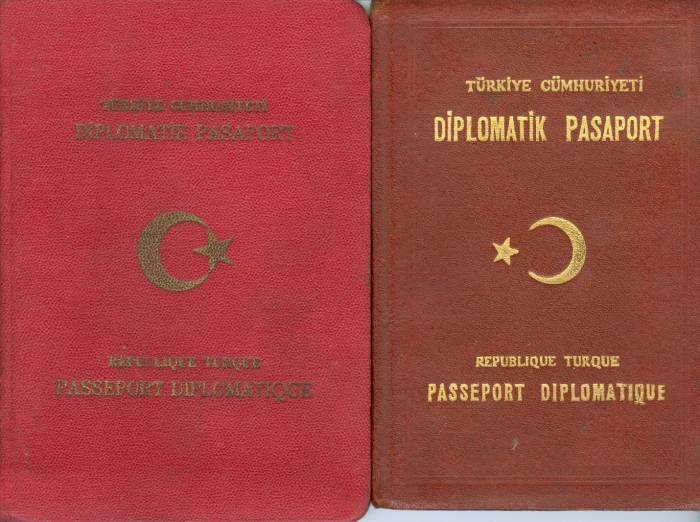
1937&1934 - Republic of Turkey, Diplomatic passports, covers

1943 - Republic of Turkey, Regular passport, cover

1954 - Republic of Turkey, Regular passport, cover

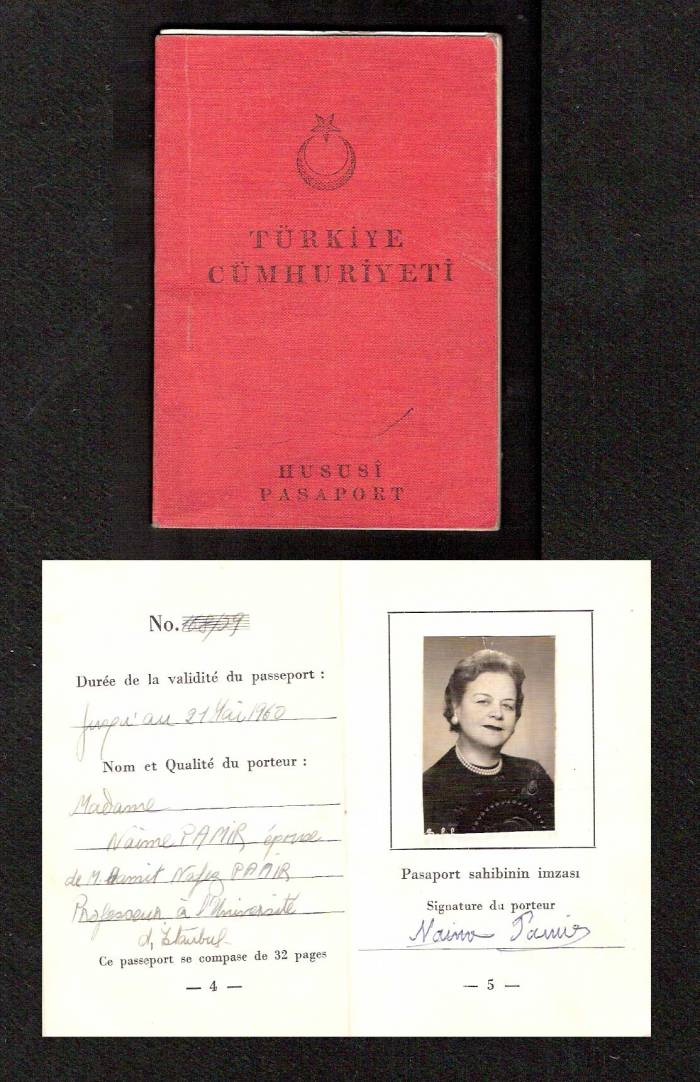
1960 - Republic of Turkey, Special passport, cover & first page, issued in Istanbul

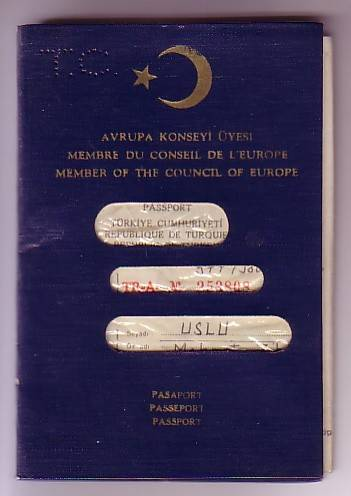
1965 - Republic of Turkey, Regular passport, with "Member of the Council of Europe" printed on the cover

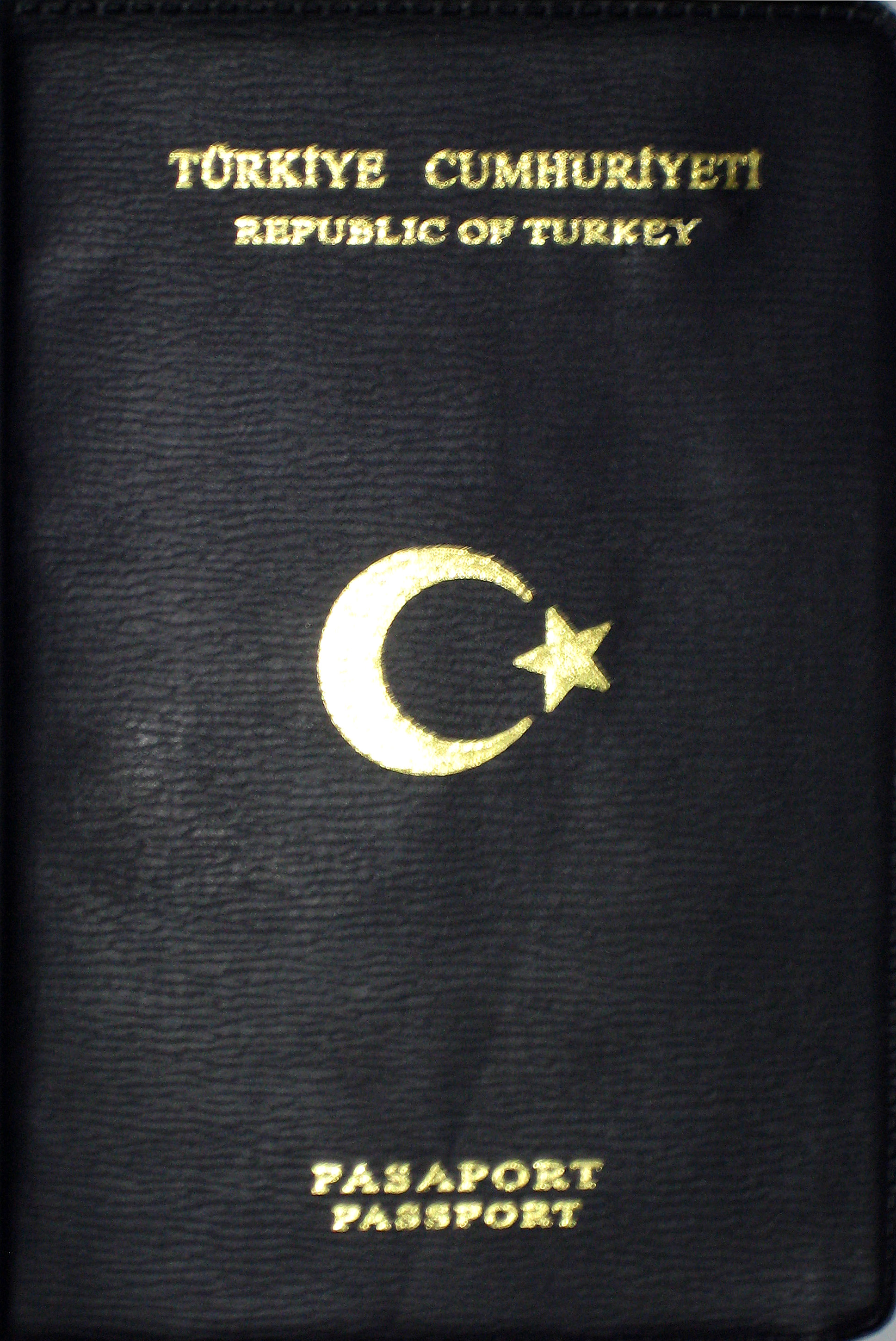
Republic of Turkey, Regular passport cover until 31 May 2010

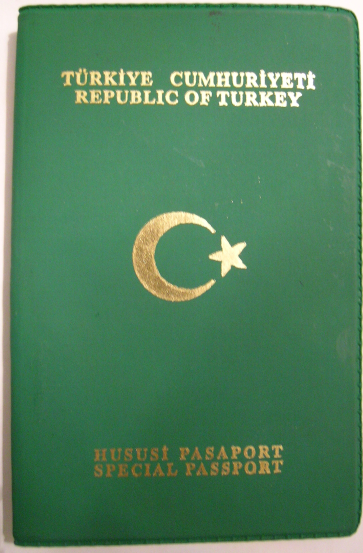
Republic of Turkey, Special passport, cover until 31 May 2010

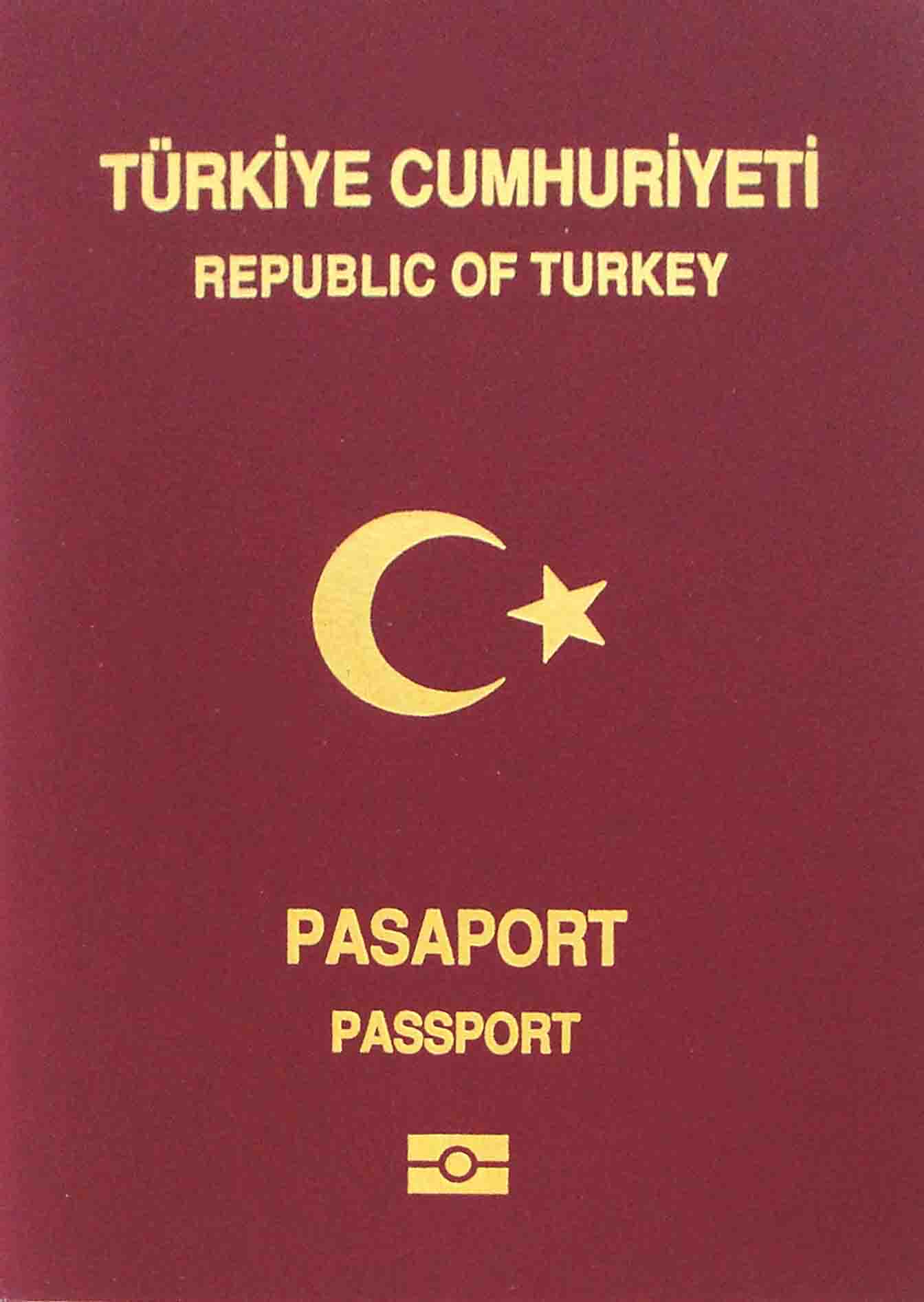
Passport of Turkey (Pasaport) issued until 1 April 2018

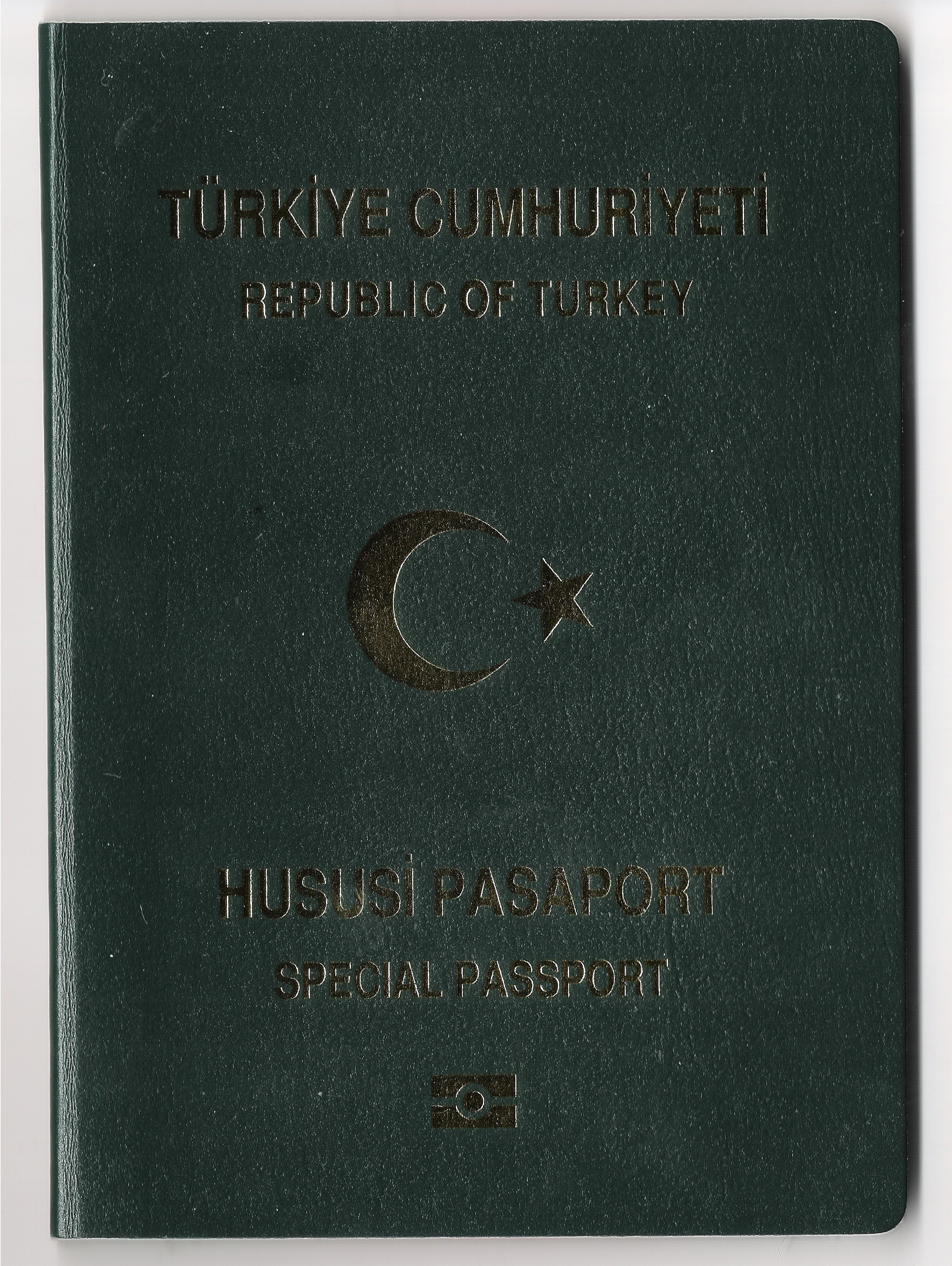
Special Passport of Turkey (Hususi Pasaport) issued until 1 April 2018

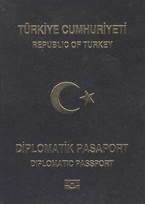
Diplomatic Passport of Turkey (Diplomatik Pasaport) issued until 1 April 2018

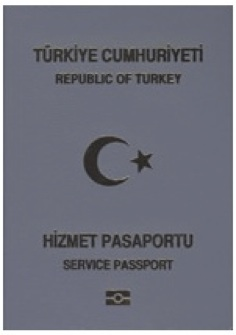
Service Passport of Turkey (Hizmet Pasaportu) issued until 1 April 2018

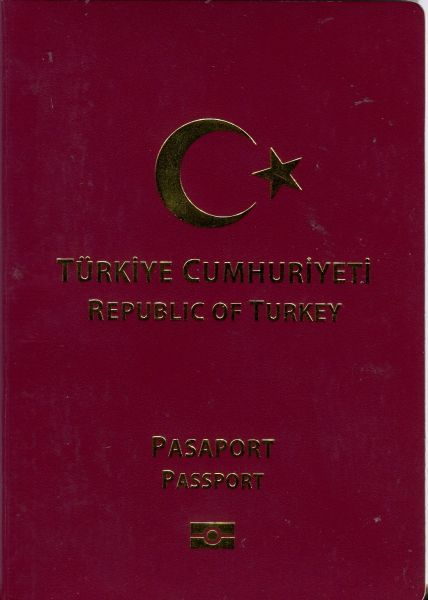
2nd generation biometric Turkish passport (Pasaport) (2018-2022)

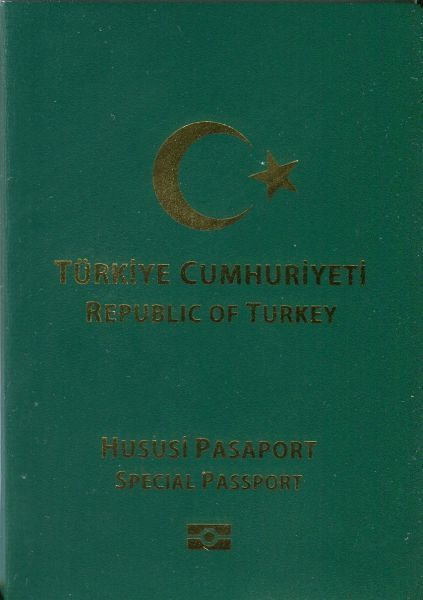
2nd generation biometric Turkish special passport (Hususi Pasaport) (2018-2022)

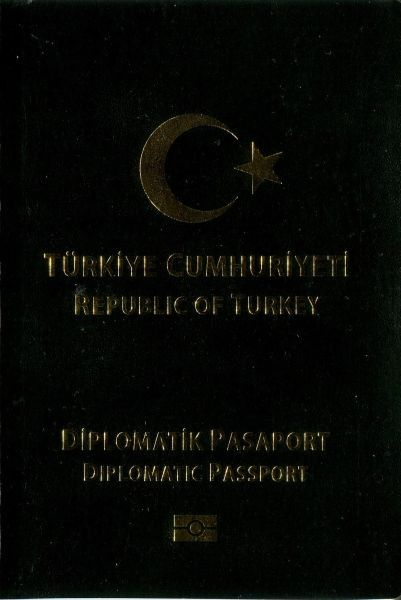
2nd generation biometric Turkish diplomatic passport (Diplomatik Pasaport) (2018-2022)

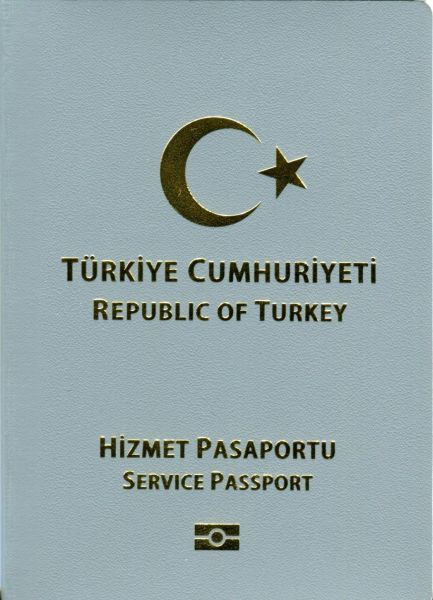
2nd generation biometric Turkish service passport (Hizmet Pasaportu) (2018–2022)

== See also ==
- Visa requirements for Turkish citizens
- Visa policy of Turkey
- Turkish identity card
- Turkish nationality law
- Turkish Identification Number
- Turkish Citizenship by Investment
- Passports in Europe
- Passports of European Union candidate states
- Turkish Passport (film), a documentary film about people rescued with Turkish passports from the Holocaust by Turkish diplomats
