= Turkish identity card =

National identity card of Turkey

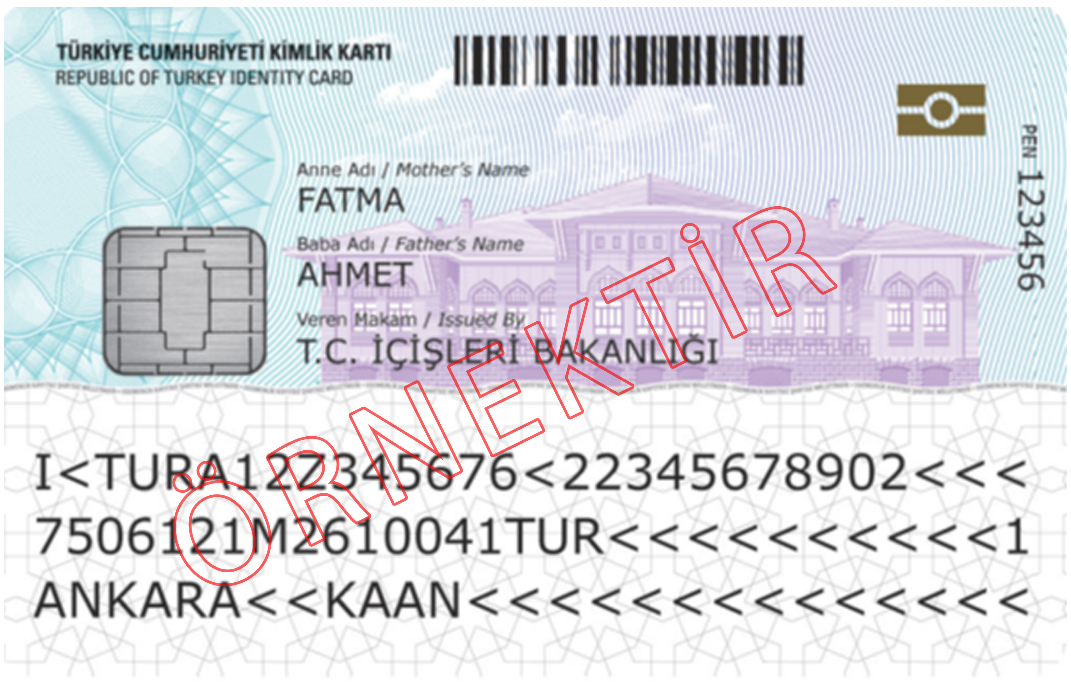
- (reverse)
- Type: Identity card, optional replacement for passport in the listed countries
- Issued by: Turkey
- Purpose: Proof of identity and travel document
- Valid in: Turkey; Azerbaijan^{1}; Bosnia and Herzegovina (planned); Georgia; Moldova; Northern Cyprus; Serbia; Ukraine^{1}^1: If arriving directly from Turkey.
- Eligibility: Turkish citizenship
- Expiration: 10 years
- Cost: ₺220 ₺440 (applies when re-issuing a lost identity card)

The Republic of Turkey Identity Card (Turkish: Türkiye Cumhuriyeti Kimlik Kartı) is mandatory for all Turkish citizens from birth. The Turkish police are authorized to request identification at any time, and failure to comply may result in a fine. The identity card also serves as a travel document for Turkish citizens entering certain countries and regions without a passport. It is currently accepted for entry into Northern Cyprus, Bosnia and Herzegovina (planned), Georgia (since 2011), Moldova (since 2019), Ukraine (since 2017, if arriving directly from Turkey), Azerbaijan (since 1 April 2021, if arriving directly from Turkey), and Serbia instead of a passport.

== History ==
Identity cards, theoretically obligatory for all citizens, male and female, existed already in the late Ottoman Empire. They were known in Turkish as nüfus tezkeresi. To the Slavic subjects of the Ottoman state they were known colloquially as nofuz (Bulgarian: нофуз).

== ID cards (1927-1991) ==
Atatürk's identity documents after the Surname Law
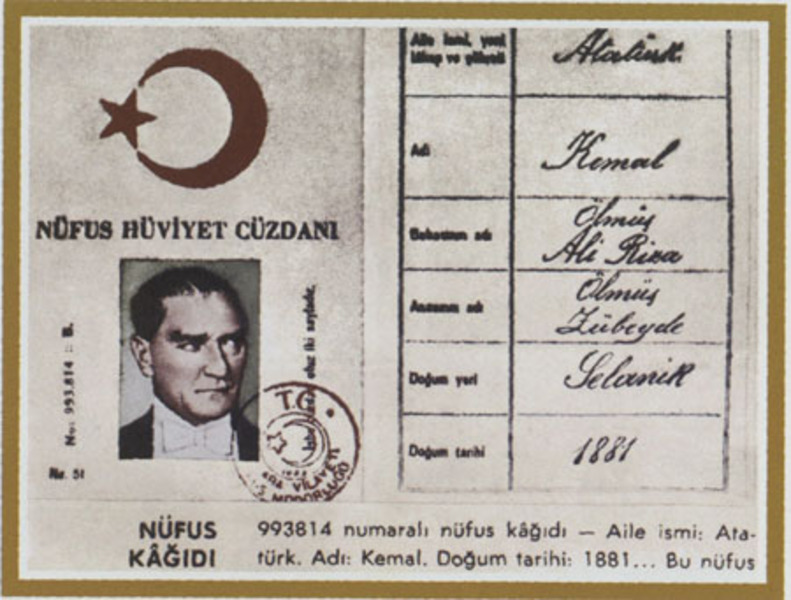
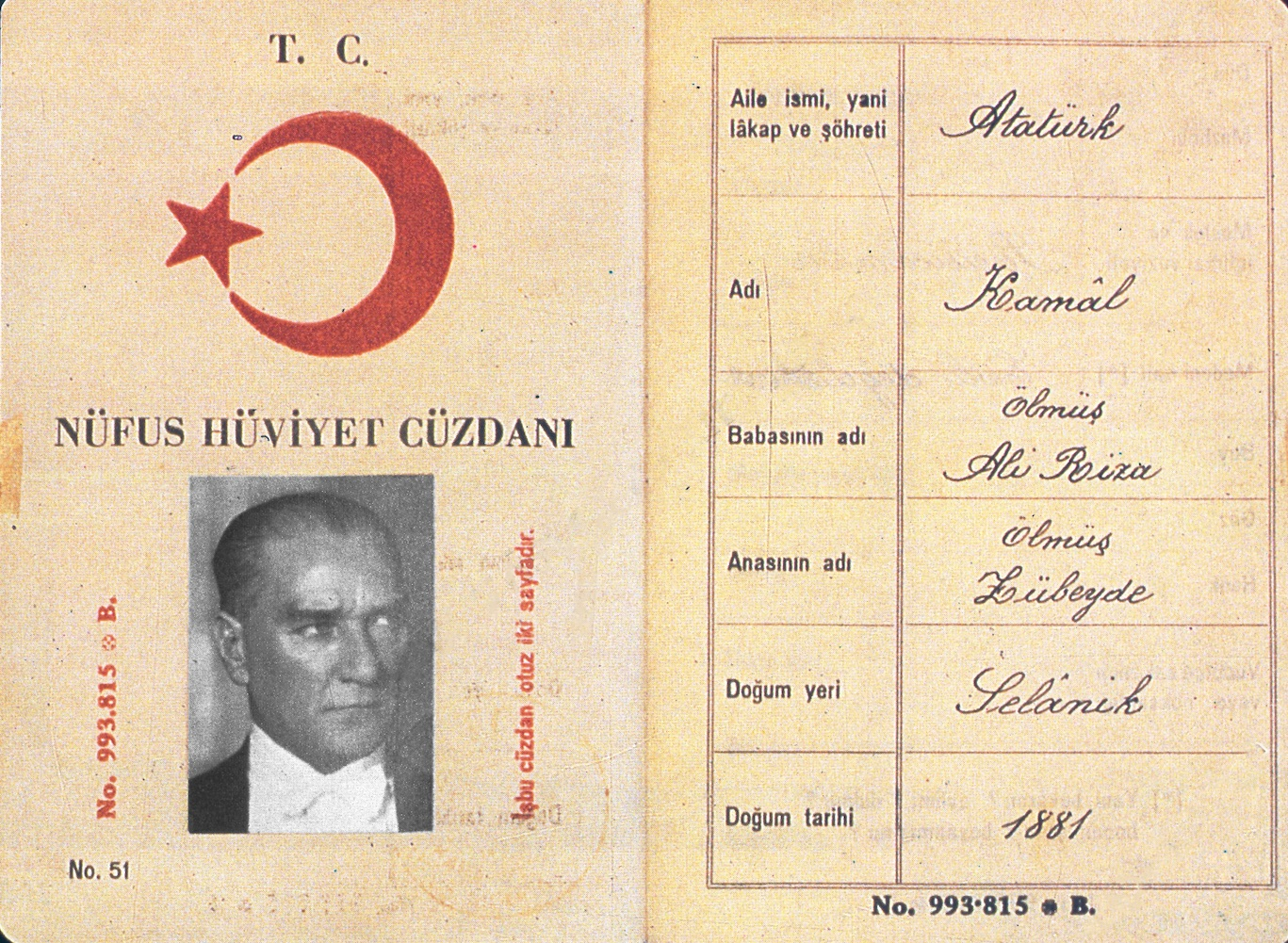

Turkey issued ID cards (Turkish: Nüfus Hüviyet Cüzdanı) with the 1927 census in Ottoman Arabic letters. With Turkey's change to Latin script, ID cards were changed to Latin in 1928. Surnames were added after 1934, with the Surname Law. Newer ID cards were issued in 1976, however old cards were still valid until 1991.

== ID cards (issued 1976-2017, still valid) ==
Turkey issued ID cards (Turkish: Nüfus Cüzdanı) for all citizens beginning in 1976. The cards are 7x9 cm in size and have gender specific color (Orange/red for females, blue for males). Starting from 1999, cards were issued with a Turkish Identification Number. Cards have an embossed stamp for security.

Starting in 2017, this type of ID cards stopped being issued.

== New identity cards (2017-current) ==
The Turkish Ministry of the Interior issued an EU-like identity card (Turkish: Kimlik Kartı) for all Turkish citizens. New identity cards are biometric like passports. Since 21 September 2020, they can be used as a driving licence. In the future they will be used as a bank card and bus ticket. Starting from 2 January 2017, these new ID cards were issued throughout Turkey. Unlike previous cards, which were valid for life, new cards are only valid for 10 years. They are in ID-1 (credit card) size, smaller than the previous cards. The cards are gender-neutral for all citizens. Cards are bilingual, both in Turkish and English. E-signatures can be installed into the card's chip. The cards have PIN codes for authorization.

During the application for new cards, fingerprints for all fingers and palm vein prints are collected and associated with the person. New cards require biometric photos (for ages 15 and up) and have an individual's signature. The new cards also omit several pieces of information found on previous cards, such as; marital status, religion, blood type, place of issue, previous surname (for females), hometown (State, District, Village) and register numbers (volume, family and line numbers).

=== Machine Readable Zone ===
There is a machine-readable zone on the back of the 2017 card. It consists of 3 rows each containing 30 characters. The format is compliant with ICAO Document 9303 Part 5.

Row	Positions	Length	Example	Meaning
1	1-2	2	I<	Document code (identifies the document as an Official Travel Document)
1	3-5	3	TUR	ISO 3166 Alpha-3 code of the issuing state
1	6-14	9	A12B34567	Document No (Seri No)
1	15	1	0	Check digit for positions 6-14
1	16	1	<	Separator character
1	17-27	11	12345678901	Turkish Identity No, matches with the ID No at the front of the card and barcode at the top right
1	28-30	3	<	Separator character
2	1-6	6	950110	Date of birth in YYMMDD format
2	7	1	3	Check digit for position 1-6
2	8	1	F	Abbreviated gender
2	9-14	6	250101	Expiry date in YYMMDD format
2	15	1	8	Check digit for positions 9-14
2	16-18	3	TUR	ISO 3166 Alpha-3 code of country of citizenship (which is always TUR)
2	19-29	11	<	Separator character
2	30	1	4	Composite check digit
3	1-30	30	DOE<<JANE<ANON	Family name(s) each separated by a single separator character (<), two separator characters (<<), given name(s) each separated by a single separator character (<)

Checksum calculation is the same algorithm used in Machine-readable passports. Multiply each digit by its weight. Weight of a digit depends on its position. The weight sequence is 7, 3, 1 and it repeats. The remainder of the sum of all values divided by 10 gives the check digit.

== See also ==
- Turkish passport
- Visa policy of Turkey
- Driving licence in Turkey
- Turkish Identification Number
- Turkish nationality law
- Visa requirements for Turkish citizens
- National identity cards in the European Economic Area
