= Passports of European Union candidate states =

European Union candidate states
- EU candidate states shown in cyan.
- Demonyms: Albanian; Bosnian, Herzegovinian; Georgian; Moldovan; Montenegrin; Macedonian; Serbian; Turkish; Ukrainian
- Candidate states: Albania; Bosnia and Herzegovina; Georgia; Moldova; Montenegro; North Macedonia; Serbia; Turkey; Ukraine

Area
  - Total: 1,617,711 km^{2} (624,602 sq mi)

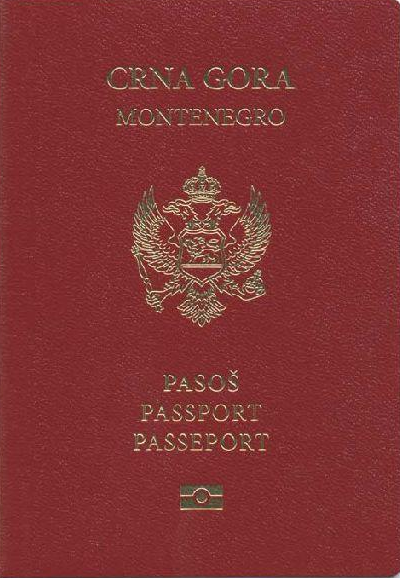
The front cover of a contemporary Montenegrin biometric passport.

Since the 1980s, member states of the European Union have started to harmonise aspects of the designs of their ordinary passports (but not other types of passports, such as diplomatic, service and emergency passports), as well as common security features and biometrics.

Most passports issued by EU member states have the common recommended layout; burgundy in colour with the words "European Union" accompanied by the name of the issuing member state printed on the cover.

== Characteristics ==
=== Overall format ===
- Paper size B7 (ISO/IEC 7810 ID-3, 88 mm × 125 mm)
- 32 pages (passports with more pages can be issued to frequent travellers)
- Colour of cover: burgundy red or blue

=== Cover ===
Information on the cover, in this order, in the language(s) of the issuing state:

- Name of the issuing state
- Emblem of the state
- The word "PASSPORT"
- The biometric passport symbol:

=== First page ===
Information on the first page, in one or more of the languages:

- Name of the issuing state
- The word "PASSPORT"
- Serial number (may also be repeated on the other pages)

=== Identification page ===
Information on the (possibly laminated) identification page, in the languages of the issuing state plus English and French:

1. Surname	2. Forename(s)
3. Nationality	4. Date of birth
5. Sex	6. Place of birth
7. Date of issue	8. Date of expiry
9. Authority	10. Signature of holder

=== Following page ===
Optional information on the following page:

11. Residence	12. Height
13. Colour of eyes	14. Extension of the passport
15. Name at birth (if now using married name or have legally changed names)

=== Remaining pages ===
- The following page is reserved for:
  - Details concerning the spouse of the holder of the passport (where a family passport is issued)
  - Details concerning children accompanying the holder (name, first name, date of birth, sex)
  - Photographs of the faces of spouse and children
- The following page is reserved for use by the issuing authorities
- The remaining pages are reserved for visa
- The inside back cover is reserved for additional information or recommendations by the issuing state in its own official language(s)

== Overview of passports issued by the EU candidate states ==
Candidate state	Passport cover	Visa requirements	Cost	Validity	Issuing authority	Latest version
Albania			7500 ALL	5 or 10 years	Ministry of the Interior	2015
Bosnia and Herzegovina			50 KM/€25			1 October 2014
(Georgia (country)) Georgia			18 (or older): 150 ₾; Child (under 18): 75 ₾	Adult : 10 years; Child : 3 years	Ministry of Justice	10 April 2010
Moldova			650 MDL	10 years (aged 16 or older); 7 years (aged at least 7 and under 16); 4 years (under the age of 7 years)	Public Services Agency	5 April 2023
Montenegro			€40	10 years	Ministry of the Interior	2008
North Macedonia			1800 MKD older than 27; 1700 MKD ages 4 – 27; 1600 MKD ages 0 – 4	5 or 10 years (aged 27 and older)	Ministry of the Interior	2019
Serbia			3600 RSD; 4200 RSD (if applying for replacement of a damaged passport earlier than 7 months before expiration date)	10 years	Ministry of the Interior	13 May 2016
Turkey			3494.40 (~€96) for 6 months; 4584.40 (~€126) for 1 year; 6766.40 (~€187) for 2 years; 9135 (~€252) for 3 years; 12409 (~€342) for 4–10 years	6 months; 1–10 years	Ministry of the Interior	25 August 2022
Ukraine			Free (For citizens who have reached the age of 14 and are issuing a passport of a citizen of Ukraine for the first time); ₴450 (~ €11) within 20 working days; ₴820 (~ €21) within 10 working days	4 years; 10 years	State Migration Service of Ukraine	1 January 2016

== Visa requirements for the nationals of EU candidate states for travel to the EEA, United Kingdom and Ireland ==
Nationals of the candidate countries have varying visa arrangements with the Schengen Area and the Common Travel Area members, as well as with the United Kingdom and Ireland. The following table details the requirements:

State	Current candidate status	Schengen Area Annex II	Common Travel Area UK and Ireland	USA – ESTA	Canada
Albania	Negotiating	90 days per 180 days	PRE-ARRIVAL; VISA REQUIRED	PRE-ARRIVAL; VISA REQUIRED	PRE-ARRIVAL; VISA REQUIRED
Bosnia and Herzegovina	Negotiating	90 days per 180 days	PRE-ARRIVAL; VISA REQUIRED	PRE-ARRIVAL; VISA REQUIRED	PRE-ARRIVAL; VISA REQUIRED
(Georgia (country)) Georgia	Not negotiating yet	90 days per 180 days	PRE-ARRIVAL; VISA REQUIRED	PRE-ARRIVAL; VISA REQUIRED	PRE-ARRIVAL; VISA REQUIRED
Moldova	Negotiating	90 days per 180 days	PRE-ARRIVAL; VISA REQUIRED	PRE-ARRIVAL; VISA REQUIRED	PRE-ARRIVAL; VISA REQUIRED
Montenegro	Negotiating	90 days per 180 days	PRE-ARRIVAL; VISA REQUIRED	PRE-ARRIVAL; VISA REQUIRED	PRE-ARRIVAL; VISA REQUIRED
North Macedonia	Negotiating	90 days per 180 days	PRE-ARRIVAL; VISA REQUIRED	PRE-ARRIVAL; VISA REQUIRED	PRE-ARRIVAL; VISA REQUIRED
Serbia	Negotiating	90 days per 180 days	PRE-ARRIVAL; VISA REQUIRED	PRE-ARRIVAL; VISA REQUIRED	PRE-ARRIVAL; VISA REQUIRED
Turkey	Negotiating	road map country	PRE-ARRIVAL; VISA REQUIRED	road map country	PRE-ARRIVAL; VISA REQUIRED
Ukraine	Negotiating	90 days per 180 days	PRE-ARRIVAL; VISA REQUIRED (Note: Ireland lifted visa requirements for citizens of Ukraine in early 2022.)	PRE-ARRIVAL; VISA REQUIRED	PRE-ARRIVAL; VISA REQUIRED

== Current EU enlargement agenda ==
Member states Candidates: Albania, Bosnia and Herzegovina, Georgia, Moldova, Montenegro, North Macedonia, Serbia, Turkey and Ukraine Recognised by the EU as potential candidates which have applied for membership: Kosovo (status disputed).

The enlargement of the European Union involves the accession of new member states. This process began with the Inner Six, who founded the European Coal and Steel Community (the EU's predecessor) in 1952. Since then, the EU's membership has grown to twenty-seven with the most recent expansion to Croatia in 2013 and the departure of UK in 2020.

Currently, accession negotiations are under way with several states. The process of enlargement is sometimes referred to as European integration. This term is also used to refer to the intensification of co-operation between EU member states as national governments allow for the gradual harmonisation of national laws.

To join the European Union, a state needs to fulfil economic and political conditions called the Copenhagen criteria (after the Copenhagen summit in June 1993), which require a stable democratic government that respects the rule of law, and its corresponding freedoms and institutions. According to the Maastricht Treaty, each current member state and the European Parliament must agree to any enlargement.

The present enlargement agenda of the European Union regards Ukraine, the Western Balkans and potentially Turkey, which has a long-standing application with the EU. As for the Western Balkan states, the EU had pledged to include them after their civil wars: in fact, two states have entered, three are candidates, one applied and the others have pre-accession agreements.

There are however other states in Europe which either seek membership or could potentially apply if their present foreign policy changes, or the EU gives a signal that they might now be included on the enlargement agenda. However, these are not formally part of the current agenda, which is already delayed due to bilateral disputes in the Balkans and difficulty in fully implementing the acquis communautaire (the accepted body of EU law).

Today the accession process follows a series of formal steps, from a pre-accession agreement to the ratification of the final accession treaty. These steps are primarily presided over by the European Commission (Enlargement Commissioner and DG Enlargement), but the actual negotiations are technically conducted between the Union's Member States and the candidate country.

Before a country applies for membership it typically signs an association agreement to help prepare the country for candidacy and eventual membership. Most countries do not meet the criteria to even begin negotiations before they apply, so they need many years to prepare for the process. An association agreement helps prepare for this first step.

In the case of the Western Balkans, a special process, the Stabilisation and Association Process exists to deal with the special circumstances there.

When a country formally applies for membership, the Council asks the commission to prepare an opinion on the country's readiness to begin negotiations. The council can then either accept or reject the commission's opinion (the council has only once rejected the commission's opinion when the latter advised against opening negotiations with Greece).

If the council agrees to open negotiations the screening process then begins. The commission and candidate country examine its laws and those of the EU and determine what differences exist. The Council then recommends opening negotiations on "chapters" of law that it feels there is sufficient common ground to have constructive negotiations. Negotiations are typically a matter of the candidate country convincing the EU that its laws and administrative capacity are sufficient to execute European law, which can be implemented as seen fit by the member states. Often this will involve time-lines before the Acquis Communautaire (European regulations, directives and standards) has to be fully implemented.

	State	Status	Association Agreement	Applied for Membership	Candidate status	Start of negotiations	Acquis Chapters open/closed
(Albania)	Albania	Negotiating	12 June 2006 (SAA)	28 April 2009	23 June 2014	19 July 2022	33/0 of 33
(Bosnia and Herzegovina)	Bosnia and Herzegovina	Negotiating	16 June 2008 (SAA)	15 February 2016	15 December 2022	–	–
(Georgia (country))	Georgia	Candidate	1 July 2016 (AA)	3 March 2022	14 December 2023	–	–
(Moldova)	Moldova	Negotiating	27 June 2014 (AA)	3 March 2022	23 June 2022	25 June 2024	5/0 of 33
(Montenegro)	Montenegro	Negotiating	15 October 2007 (SAA)	15 December 2008	17 December 2010	18 December 2012	33/16 of 33
(North Macedonia)	North Macedonia	Negotiating	9 April 2001 (SAA)	22 March 2004	17 December 2005	19 July 2022	–
(Serbia)	Serbia	Negotiating	29 April 2008 (SAA)	22 December 2009	1 March 2012	14 December 2015	22/2 of 34
(Turkey)	Turkey	Negotiating	12 September 1963 (AA)	14 April 1987	12 December 1999	3 October 2005	16/1 of 33
(Ukraine)	Ukraine	Negotiating	27 June 2014 (AA)	28 February 2022	23 June 2022	25 June 2024	5/0 of 33

== Gallery of EU candidate state passports ==
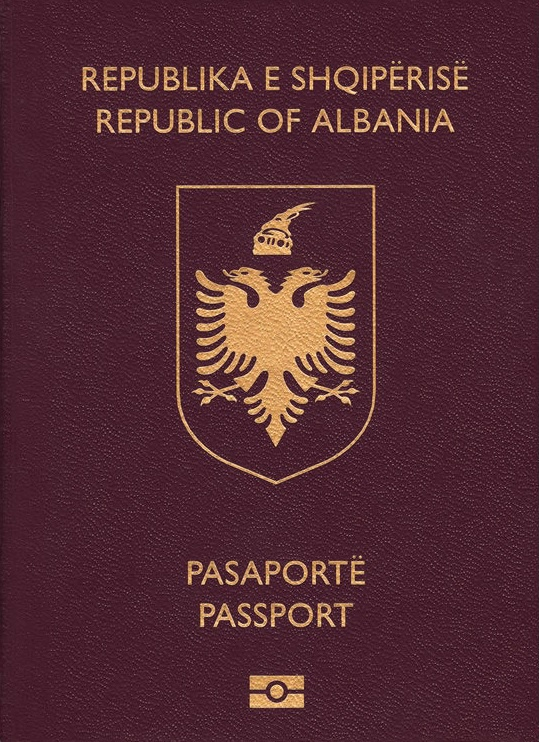
(Albania) Albanian passport

Bosnia and Herzegovina passport

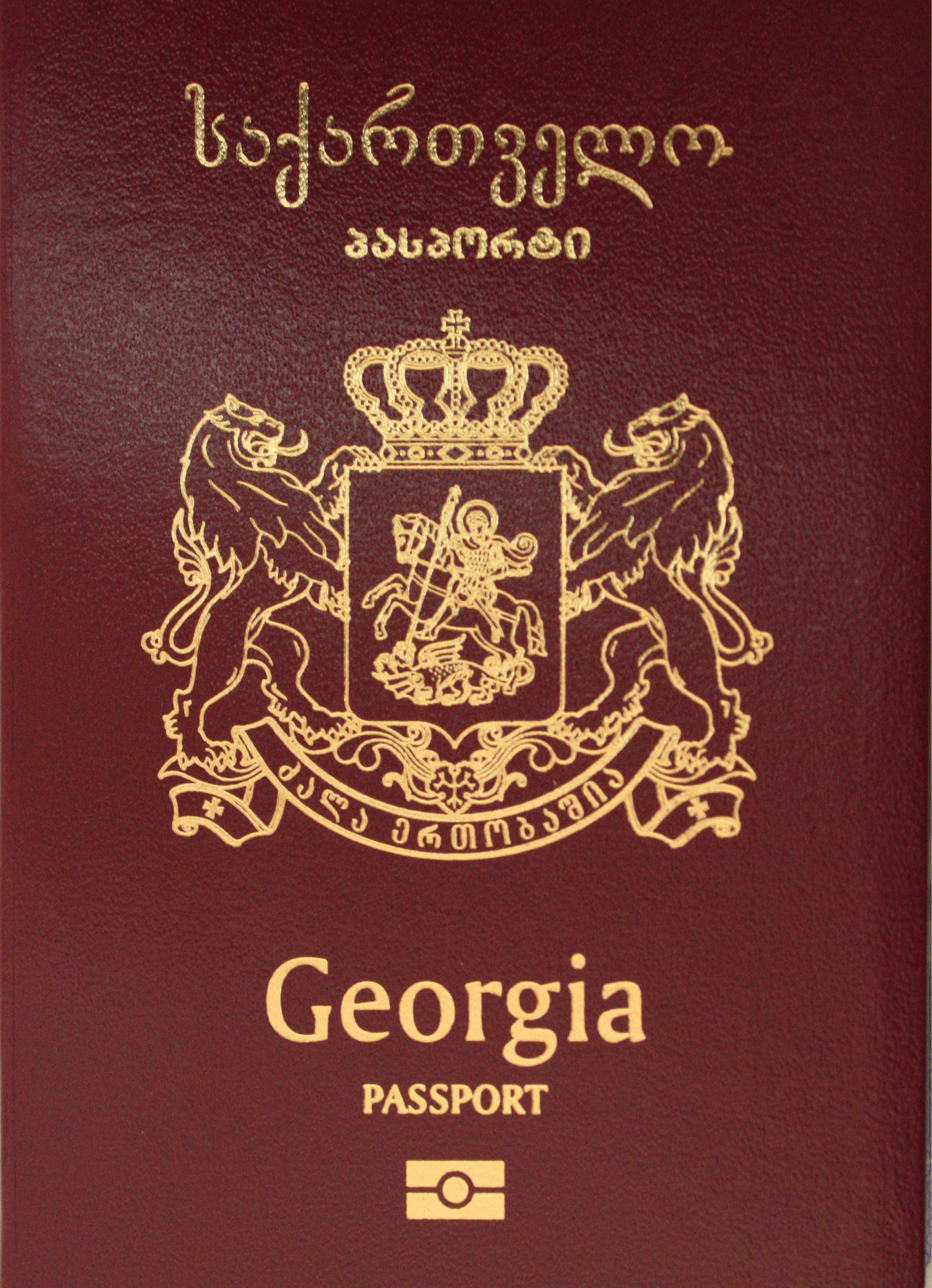
(Georgia (country)) Georgian passport

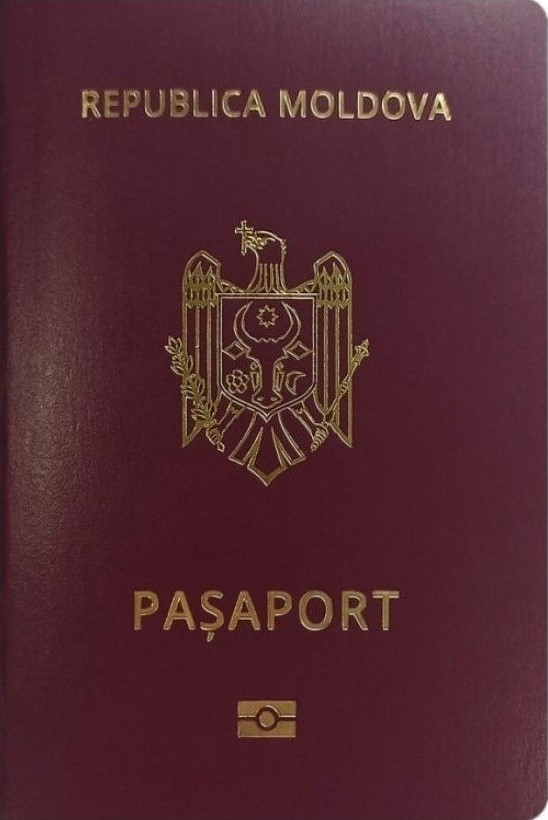
(Moldova) Moldovan passport

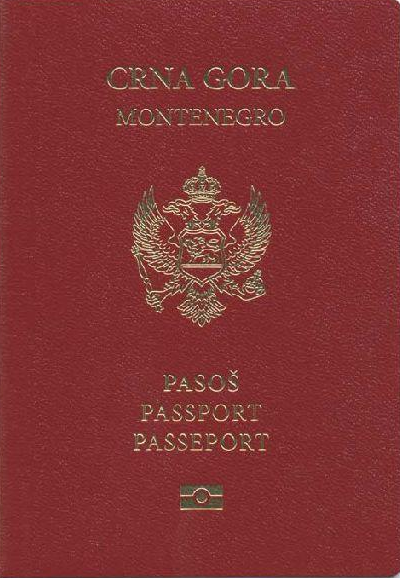
(Montenegro) Montenegrin passport

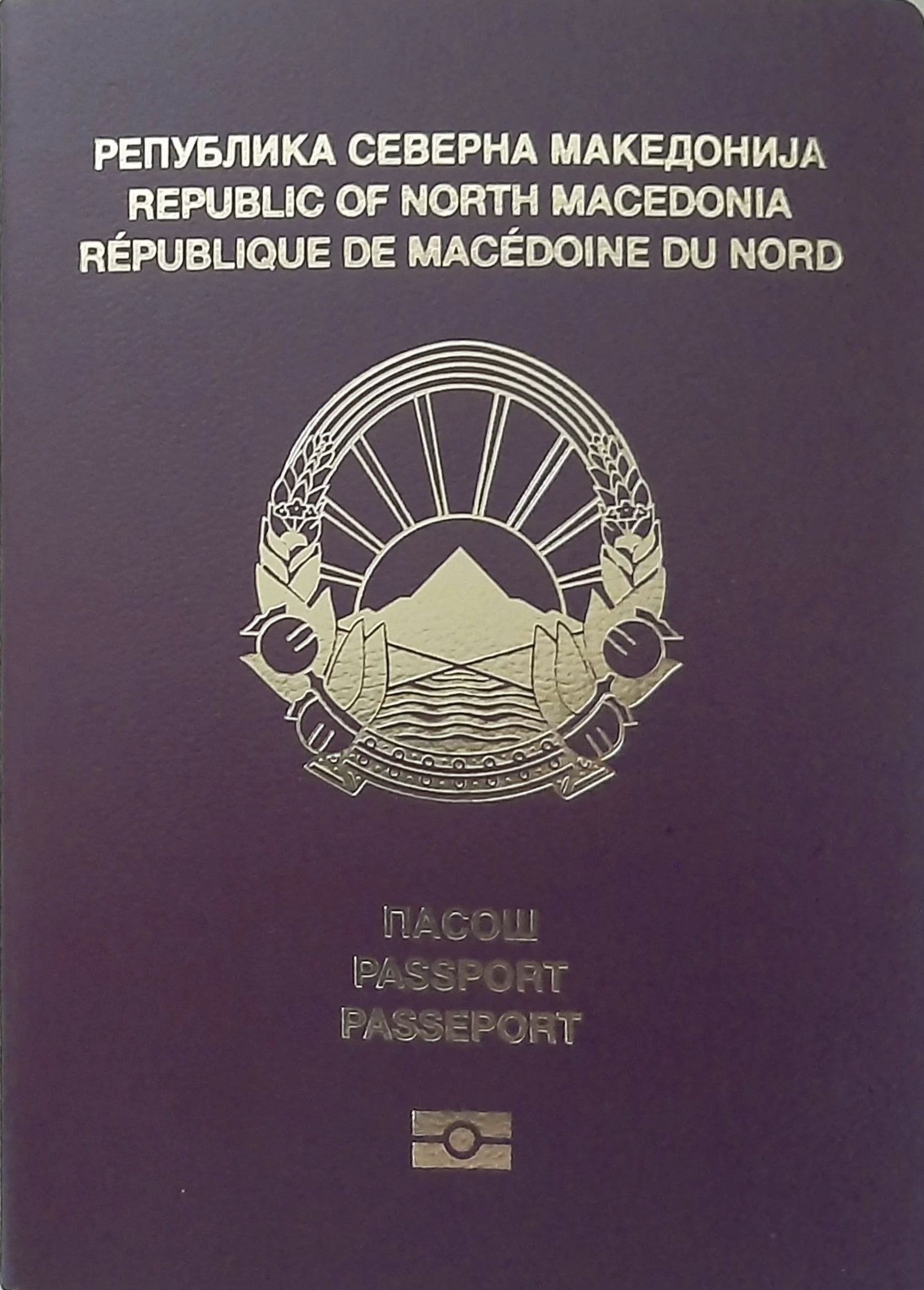
North Macedonia passport

(Serbia) Serbian passport

(Turkey) Turkish passport

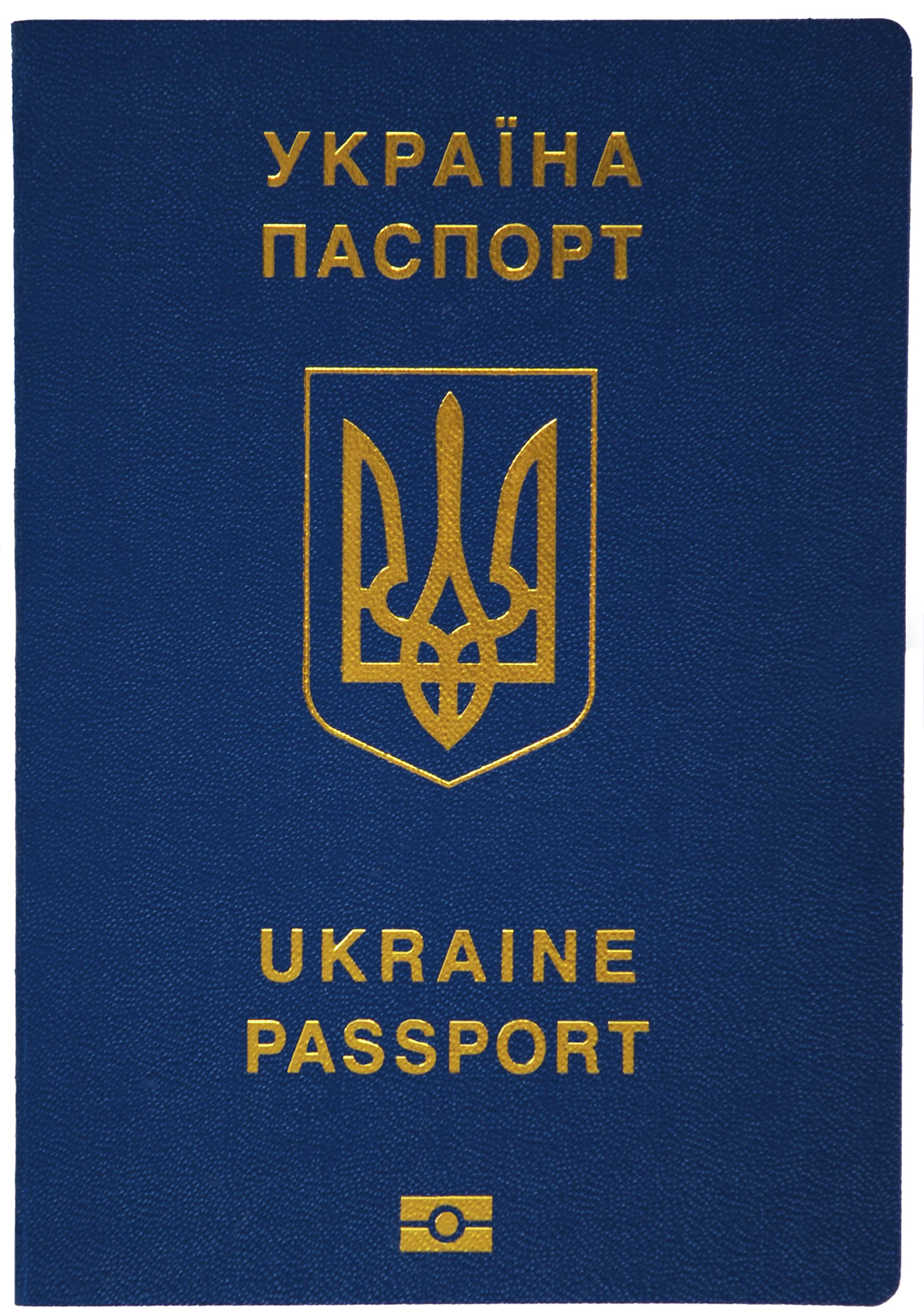
(Ukraine) Ukrainian passport

== See also ==
- Future enlargement of the European Union
- Passports of the European Union
- Passports of the EFTA member states
- Schengen Area
- Common Travel Area
- Visa policy in the European Union
- United Kingdom visa requirements
- National identity cards in the European Economic Area
- European Economic Area
- European Free Trade Association
- United States visa
- Electronic System for Travel Authorization
- Visa policy of Canada
- List of passports
