= Demographics of Saint Helena, Ascension and Tristan da Cunha =

Saint Helena, Ascension and Tristan da Cunha are British Overseas Territories in the south Atlantic Ocean.

== Saint Helena ==
Census population

Year	Pop.	±% p.a.
1670	66	—
1723	1,110	+5.47%
1817	6,150	+1.84%
1851	6,914	+0.34%
1861	6,860	−0.08%
1871	6,241	−0.94%
1881	5,059	−2.08%
1891	4,116	−2.04%
1901	9,850	+9.12%
1911	3,520	−9.78%
1921	3,747	+0.63%

Year	Pop.	±% p.a.
1931	3,995	+0.64%
1946	4,748	+1.16%
1956	4,642	−0.23%
1966	4,649	+0.02%
1976	5,147	+1.02%
1987	5,644	+0.84%
1998	5,157	−0.82%
2008	4,257	−1.90%
2016	4,534	+0.79%
2021	4,439	−0.42%

Source: 2008 Census, St. Helena Government

When Saint Helena was discovered in the 16th century the island was uninhabited. With almost 10,000 inhabitants at the 1901 census, the highest number of residents was reached. However, this number included almost 6,000 Boer prisoners of war. Excluding the prisoners of war (who were on the island during 1900-1902), the highest population in the twentieth century was reached in 1987. The population gradually decreased thereafter and reached 4,000 in 2024, mainly descended from Africans, Mixed race African and Europeans, British settlers, East India Company employees and indentured labourers from the South Asian sub-Continent, East Indies, Madagascar and China.

The language spoken in Saint Helena is English.

The people of Saint Helena are Saint Helenians (though locally they are known as "Saints"); the demonym being Saint Helenian.

A census in February 2016 recorded a population of 4,534 on the island. This compares with a figure of 4,257 recorded in 2008 and a figure of 5,157 recorded in 1998. The fall between 1998 and 2008 can be explained mostly by emigration, especially since 2002 when the islanders were granted full British citizenship. The main diasporas are to the United Kingdom, South Africa and more recently to the Falkland Islands, as well as on Ascension Island. The population density, based on the 2016 figure, is 37.3 persons per km^{2}, or 95.3 per sq mile.

The island of Saint Helena is administratively divided into eight districts, each with a community centre. The districts also serve as statistical subdivisions. The island is a single electoral area, sending twelve representatives to the Legislative Council.

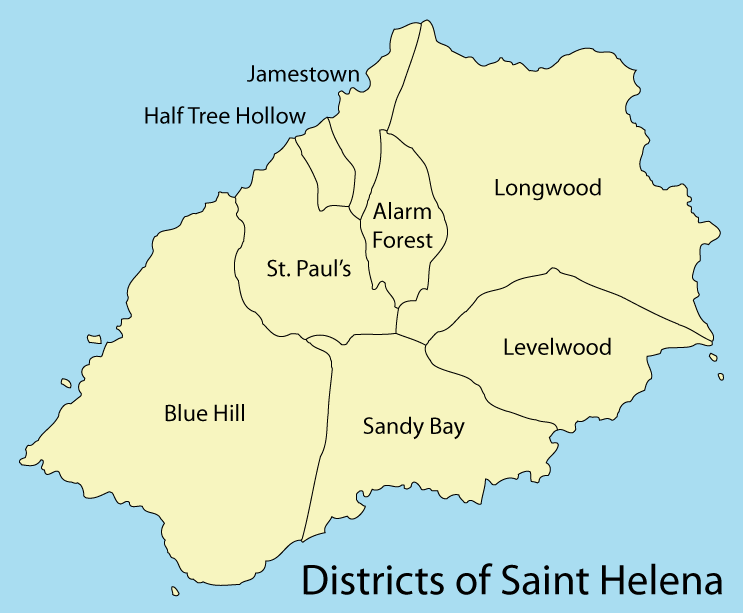
Districts of Saint Helena

District	Area km^{2}	Area sq mi	Pop. 1998	Pop. 2008	Pop. 2016	Pop./km^{2} 2016
Alarm Forest	5.4	2.1	289	276	383	70.4
Blue Hill	36.8	14.2	177	153	158	4.3
Half Tree Hollow	1.6	0.6	1,140	901	984	633.2
Jamestown	3.9	1.5	884	716	629	161.9
Levelwood	14.8	5.7	376	316	369	25.0
Longwood	33.4	12.9	960	715	790	23.6
Sandy Bay	16.1	6.2	254	205	193	12.0
Saint Paul's	11.4	4.4	908	795	843	74.0
People aboard RMS St. Helena	–	–	149	171	183 (Note: The ship left St. Helena on 7 February 2016 and is included as it was in transit on the day of the census. Of which 81 were St. Helenian and 102 were of other nationalities. The total number of crew was 56.)	–
Yachts in Harbour	–	–	20	9	13 (Note: All of which were foreigners.)	–
Total	123.3	47.6	5,157	4,257	4,349	35.3

=== Age structure ===
Population by Sex and Age Group (Census 07.II.2021) (Data refer to resident population.):

Age group	Male	Female	Total	%
Total	2 247	2 192	4 439	100
0–4	94	88	182	4.10
5–9	109	112	221	4.98
10–14	117	96	213	4.80
15–19	83	92	175	3.94
20–24	92	83	175	3.94
25–29	112	89	201	4.53
30–34	107	107	214	4.82
35–39	119	151	270	6.08
40–44	101	131	232	5.23
45–49	158	150	308	6.94
50–54	205	195	400	9.01
55–59	171	179	350	7.88
60–64	205	186	391	8.81
65-69	174	145	319	7.19
70-74	167	157	324	7.30
75-79	138	106	244	5.50
80-84	60	64	124	2.79
85-89	30	31	61	1.37
90-94	5	21	26	0.59
95-99	0	8	8	0.18
100+	0	1	1	0.02
Age group	Male	Female	Total	Per cent
0–14	320	296	616	13.88
15–64	1 353	1 363	2 716	61.18
65+	574	533	1107	24.94

Sex ratio
Age range (years)	Ratio male/female
at birth	1.049
0-14	1.04
15-64	1.04
65+	0.94
Total	1.02

=== Vital statistics ===
==== Births and deaths ====
Year	Population(01.01) (×1000)	Live births	Deaths	Natural change	Crude birth rate	Crude death rate	Rate of natural change	TFR
2009		35	41	−6	8.5	9.9	−1.4	
2010	4.121	34	53	−19	9.1	12.5	−3.4	
2011	4.188	34	49	−15	9.1	12.3	−3.2	
2012	4.316	32	62	−30	8.5	12.4	−3.9	
2013	4.311	35	55	−20	8.3	12.6	-4.3	
2014	4.649	48	61	−13	8.8	13.4	−4.6	
2015	4.791	40	55	−15	9.2	13.3	−4.1	
2016	4.837	35	45	−10	9.3	12.7	−3.4	
2017	4.608	36	58	−22	9.7	12.5	−2.8	
2018	4.951	26	52	−26	9.1	12.3	−3.2	
2019	4.760	31	38	−7	8.4	11.2	−2.8	
2020	4.609	29	49	−20	6.3	10.6	-4.3	
2021	4,423	39	68	-29	9.0	15.6	-6.7	
2022	4,268	26	64	-38	6.1	15.0	-8.9	
2023	4,245	19	61	-42	4.5	14.4	-9.9	

==== Life expectancy ====
By 2010 estimates, life expectancy at birth for the total population is 78.6 years (for males it is 75.68; for females it is 81.67).

==== Infant mortality ====
The infant mortality rate is 16.98 deaths per 1,000 live births.

=== Ethnicity ===
According to the CIA World Factbook, 50% of the population of Saint Helena Island are African Saint Helenians, while Chinese Saint Helenians and White Saint Helenians make up 25% each. However, the possibility of clear-cut categorical divisions between ethnicities on present day St Helena, as reflected by these statistics, is disputed. Most Saint Helenians today are multiracial, similar to the Cape Coloureds.

Ascension has no civilian population, while Tristan da Cunha has a white population descended primarily from the British Isles or from the Falkland Islands.

=== Religion ===
The majority of St. Helenians are Anglican. Other religions in St. Helena include (in alphabetic order): the Baháʼí Faith, the Baptist church, Buddhism, Roman Catholicism, and Seventh-day Adventism.

According to the statistics in the 2014 Yearbook of Jehovah's Witnesses, Saint Helena has the highest proportion of Jehovah's Witnesses of any country or territory in the world: one person in thirty-five, using an estimated population of 4,000 for St Helena and a count of 118 members.

In Tristan da Cunha, Christianity is the main religion, with the largest denominations being Anglican and Roman Catholic.

Religion in Saint Helena (2021)
Denomination	Resident population (St Helena)	Percentage
Anglican	2765	63.2
Jehovah's Witness	167	3.8
Baptist	100	2.3
Roman Catholic	96	2.2
New Apostolic	72	1.6
Seventh Day Adventist	85	1.9
Salvation Army	88	2.0
Islam	16	0.4
Baháʼí	10	0.2
Other	20	0.5
Not Stated	429	9.8
Doesn't have a faith	395	9.0
Saint Helena	4376	100.0

== Ascension Island and Tristan da Cunha ==
Ascension Island has a population of around eight hundred inhabitants, with the majority being Saint Helenians, located in Georgetown on the west coast of the island, with another small settlement, Two Boats, located in Ascension's interior.

Tristan da Cunha has a population of about three hundred inhabitants, mainly located in the Edinburgh of the Seven Seas settlement on Tristan's North Coast.

== Nationality ==
The citizens of Saint Helena, Ascension and Tristan da Cunha hold British Overseas Territories citizenship. On 21 May 2002 they were granted access to full British citizenship by the British Overseas Territories Act 2002, and there is a special Saint Helena passport issued to them.

== See also ==
- British Overseas Territory Citizens in mainland United Kingdom
