= Visa requirements for British Overseas Territories citizens =

A British Overseas Territories citizen holds British nationality by virtue of a connection with a British Overseas Territory.

British Overseas Territories citizens (BOTCs) enjoy visa-free entry to a number of countries and territories. However, in some cases, foreign authorities only grant them a visa-free entry if they present a passport with an endorsement stating their right of abode in the United Kingdom.

Visa requirements for other classes of British nationals such as British citizens, British Nationals (Overseas), British Overseas citizens, British Protected Persons or British Subjects are different.

== Passports ==
British passports issued to British Overseas Territories citizens include:

- (Anguilla) Anguillian passport
- (Bermuda) Bermudian passport
- British Virgin Islands passport
- (Cayman Islands) Caymanian passport
- Gibraltar passport
- (Montserrat) Montserratian passport
- Pitcairn Islands passport
- Saint Helena passport
- Turks and Caicos Islands passport

== Visa requirements map ==
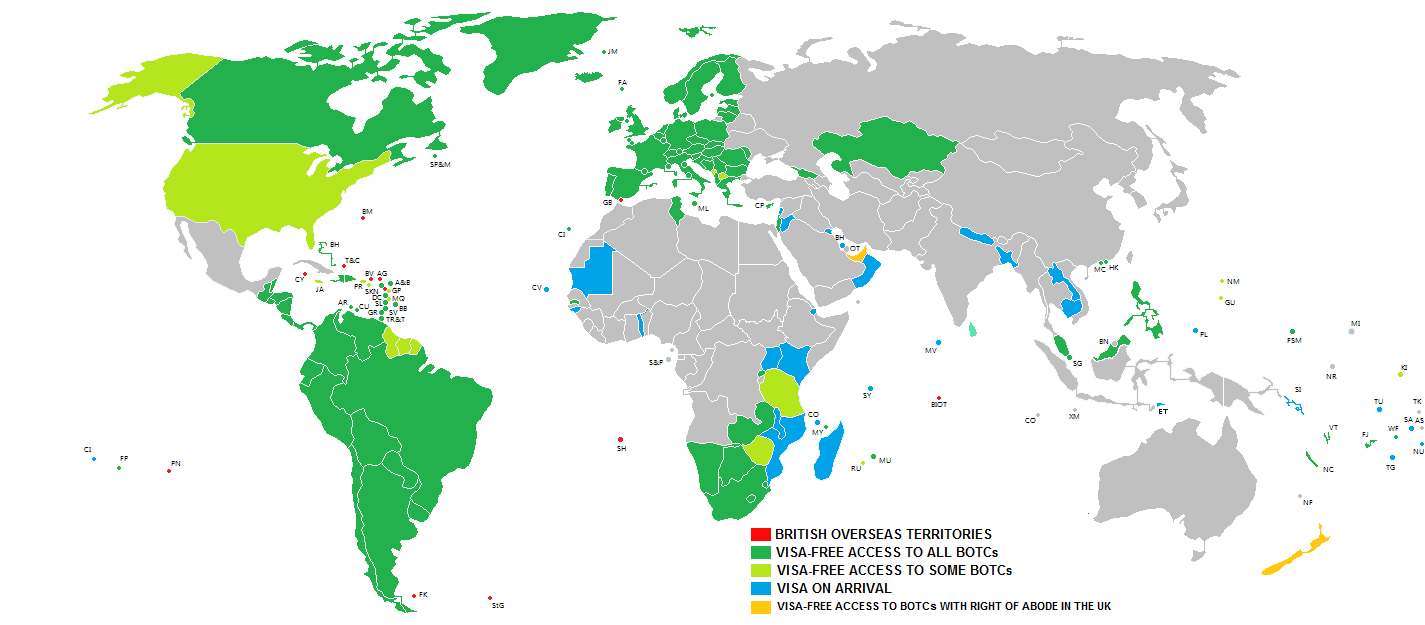
Visa requirements for British Overseas Territories citizens

== Visa requirements ==
Country	Visa requirement	Allowed stay	Notes (excluding departure fees)
Afghanistan	Visa required		
Albania	Visa not required	90 days	
Algeria	Visa required		
Andorra	Visa not required		
Angola	Visa required		
Antigua and Barbuda	Visa not required	6 months	
Argentina	Visa not required	90 days	
Armenia	Visa required		
Australia	Visa required		May apply online (Online Visitor e600 visa).
Austria	Visa not required	90 days	90 days within any 180 day period in the Schengen Area
Azerbaijan	Visa required		
Bahamas	Visa not required	8 months	
Bahrain	eVisa		
Bangladesh	Visa on arrival	30 days	
Barbados	Visa not required	6 months	
Belarus	Visa required		
Belgium	Visa not required	90 days	90 days within any 180 day period in the Schengen Area
Belize	Visa not required	90 days	
Benin	eVisa	30 days	
Bhutan	Visa required		
Bolivia	Visa not required	90 days	
Bosnia and Herzegovina	Visa not required	90 days	
Botswana	Visa not required	90 days	
Brazil	Visa not required	90 days	
Brunei	Visa required		
Bulgaria	Visa not required	90 days	90 days within any 180 day period
Burkina Faso	Visa on arrival	1 month	
Burundi	Visa required		
Cambodia	Visa on arrival	30 days	
Cameroon	Visa required		
Canada	Visa not required	6 months	eTA required if arriving by air.
Cape Verde	Visa on arrival		
Central African Republic	Visa required		
Chad	Visa required		
Chile	Visa not required	90 days	
China	Visa required		
Colombia	Visa not required	180 days	
Comoros	Visa on arrival		
Republic of the Congo	Visa required		
Democratic Republic of the Congo	Visa required		
Costa Rica	Visa not required	90 days	
Côte d'Ivoire	Visa required		
Croatia	Visa not required	90 days	90 days within any 180 day period
Cuba	Visa required		
Cyprus	Visa not required	90 days	90 days within any 180 day period
Czech Republic	Visa not required	90 days	90 days within any 180 day period in the Schengen Area
Denmark	Visa not required	90 days	90 days within any 180 day period in the Schengen Area
Djibouti	Visa on arrival		
Dominica	Visa not required	6 months	
Dominican Republic	Visa required		
Ecuador	Visa not required	90 days	
Egypt	Visa required		
El Salvador	Visa not required	3 months	
Equatorial Guinea	Visa required		
Eritrea	Visa required		
Estonia	Visa not required	90 days	90 days within any 180 day period in the Schengen Area
Eswatini	Visa not required	30 days	
Ethiopia	eVisa	up to 90 days	eVisa holders must arrive via Addis Ababa Bole International Airport.
Fiji	Visa not required	4 months	
Finland	Visa not required	90 days	90 days within any 180 day period in the Schengen Area
France	Visa not required	90 days	90 days within any 180 day period in the Schengen Area
Gabon	eVisa		Electronic visa holders must arrive via Libreville International Airport.
Gambia	Visa not required	90 days	
Georgia	Visa not required		Not applicable to holders of Anguillian passport, Montserratian passport, Pitcairn Islands passport and Saint Helena passport.
Germany	Visa not required	90 days	90 days within any 180 day period in the Schengen Area
Ghana	Visa required		
Greece	Visa not required	90 days	90 days within any 180 day period in the Schengen Area
Grenada	Visa not required	6 months	Beginning on 1 December 2020, all travellers to Grenada will be required to complete an online application in order to receive a Pure Safe Travel Authorization Certificate to enter Grenada.
Guatemala	Visa not required	90 days	
Guinea	Visa required		
Guinea-Bissau	Visa on arrival	90 days	
Guyana	Visa required		Holders of Cayman Islands passport, Montserratian passport and Turks and Caicos passport are exempt.
Haiti	Visa not required	3 months	
Honduras	Visa not required	90 days	
Hungary	Visa not required	90 days	90 days within any 180 day period in the Schengen Area
Iceland	Visa not required	90 days	90 days within any 180 day period in the Schengen Area
India	Visa required		e-Tourist Visa for holders of Anguillian passport, Caymanian passport, Montserratian passport and Turks and Caicos Islands passport.
Indonesia	Visa required		
Iran	Visa required		Tourists for Kish Island do not require a visa for a total of 14 days.
Iraq	Visa required		
Ireland	Visa not required	90 days	
Israel	Visa not required	3 months	
Italy	Visa not required	90 days	90 days within any 180 day period in the Schengen Area
Jamaica	Visa required		Not applicable to holders of British Virgin Islands passport and Caymanian passport.
Japan	Visa required		
Jordan	Visa on arrival		
Kazakhstan	Visa not required		
Kenya	Visa on arrival	3 months	Can also be entered on a visa issued by Rwanda or Uganda.
Kiribati	Visa required		Visa not required for holders of Bermudian passport, Caymanian passport, Montserratian passport, Turks and Caicos Islands passport.
North Korea	Visa required		
South Korea	K-ETA	30 days	
Kuwait	Visa on arrival	3 months	
Kyrgyzstan	eVisa		
Laos	Visa on arrival	30 days	18 (Note: Savannakhet Airport; Lanetoui - Mengkang (China); Meuangmom - Wan Pong (Myanmar); Banvang - Ban Khok Phai (Thailand); Namngeun - Huay Kon (Thailand); Paksan - Bueng Kan (Thailand); Paktaphan - Pak Saeng (Thailand); Pangmon - Ban Huak (Thailand); Phoudou (Thailand); Dak ta ock - Nam Giang (Vietnam); La Lai (Vietnam); Namkan (Vietnam); Namphao - Cau Treo (Vietnam); Namsoy - Na Meo (Vietnam); Naphao - Cha Lo (Vietnam); Pahang - Long Sap (Vietnam); Panghok - Tây Trang (Vietnam); Phoukeua - Bo Y (Vietnam)) of the 33 border crossings are only open to regular visa holders.; e-Visa may be used to enter Laos through the Luang Prabang, Pakse and Vientiane international airports, 3 Thai-Lao Friendship Bridges (Note: Vientiane (Friendship Bridge 1); Savannakhet (Friendship Bridge 2); Bokeo (Friendship Bridge 4)), in Boten (road and railroad), and in Vientiane (at Khamsavath railway station).; Visa on arrival is available at the Luang Prabang, Pakse and Vientiane international airports, 4 Thai-Lao Friendship Bridges (Note: Vientiane (Friendship Bridge 1); Savannakhet (Friendship Bridge 2); Khammouane (Friendship Bridge 3); Bokeo (Friendship Bridge 4)) and 7 border crossings. (Note: Nongnokkheane - Trapeang Kriel (Cambodia); Boten - Bo han (China); Golden Triangle/Samliemkham (Thailand); Khamsavath railway station (Thailand); Namheuang - Ban Na Kraseng (Thailand); Vang tao - Chongmek (Thailand); Dansavan - Lao Bảo (Vietnam))
Latvia	Visa not required	90 days	90 days within any 180 day period in the Schengen Area
Lebanon	Visa required		
Lesotho	Visa not required		
Liberia	Visa required		
Libya	Visa required		
Liechtenstein	Visa not required	90 days	90 days within any 180 day period in the Schengen Area
Lithuania	Visa not required	90 days	90 days within any 180 day period in the Schengen Area
Luxembourg	Visa not required	90 days	90 days within any 180 day period in the Schengen Area
Madagascar	Visa on arrival	90 days	
Malawi	Visa on arrival		
Malaysia	Visa not required	3 months	
Maldives	Visa on arrival	30 days	
Mali	Visa required		
Malta	Visa not required	90 days	90 days within any 180 day period in the Schengen Area
Marshall Islands	Visa required		
Mauritania	Visa on arrival		Available at Nouakchott–Oumtounsy International Airport.
Mauritius	Visa not required	90 days	
Mexico	Visa required		Holders of Bermudan and BVI passports are exempt.
Micronesia	Visa not required	30 days	
Moldova	Visa not required	90 days	90 days within any 180 day period
Monaco	Visa not required		
Mongolia	Visa required		
Montenegro	Visa not required	90 days	
Morocco	Visa required		
Mozambique	Visa on arrival	30 days	
Myanmar	eVisa	28 days	eVisa holders must arrive via Yangon International Airport.
Namibia	Visa not required	3 months	
Nauru	Visa required		
Nepal	Visa on arrival	90 days	
Netherlands	Visa not required	90 days	90 days within any 180 day period in the Schengen Area
New Zealand	Visa required		May enter using eGate.; Holders of a British non-citizen passport who can provide evidence of the right to reside permanently in the United Kingdom may be granted a Visitor Visa current for six months on arrival, subject to meeting character requirements and providing that the purposes of the visit do not include medical consultation or treatment. Electronic Travel Authority must be obtained prior to departure.; Holders of an Australian Permanent Resident Visa or Resident Return Visa may be granted a New Zealand Resident Visa on arrival permitting indefinite stay (pursuant to the Trans-Tasman Travel Arrangement), subject to meeting character requirements and obtaining an Electronic Travel Authority prior to departure.
Nicaragua	Visa not required	90 days	
Niger	Visa required		
Nigeria	Visa required		
North Macedonia	Visa required		Visa not required for holders of Gibraltar passport.
Norway	Visa not required	90 days	90 days within any 180 day period in the Schengen Area
Oman	Visa on arrival		
Pakistan	Visa required		
Palau	Visa on arrival	30 days	
Panama	Visa not required	180 days	
Papua New Guinea	Visa required		
Paraguay	Visa not required	90 days	
Peru	Visa not required	183 days	
Philippines	Visa not required	30 days	
Poland	Visa not required	90 days	90 days within any 180 day period in the Schengen Area
Portugal	Visa not required	90 days	90 days within any 180 day period in the Schengen Area
Qatar	Free visa on arrival	30 days	Available at Hamad International Airport. eVisa is also available.
Romania	Visa not required	90 days	90 days within any 180 day period
Russia	Visa required		
Rwanda	Visa not required		
Saint Kitts and Nevis	Visa not required	6 months	
Saint Lucia	Visa not required	6 weeks	
Saint Vincent and the Grenadines	Visa not required	6 months	
Samoa	Entry Permit on arrival	60 days	
San Marino	Visa not required		
São Tomé and Príncipe	Visa required		
Saudi Arabia	Visa required		
Senegal	Visa not required	90 days	
Serbia	Visa not required		
Seychelles	Visitor's Permit on arrival	3 months	
Sierra Leone	Visa required		
Singapore	Visa not required	30 days	90 days for holders of a Certificate of Entitlement to the Right of Abode.
Slovakia	Visa not required	90 days	90 days within any 180 day period in the Schengen Area
Slovenia	Visa not required	90 days	90 days within any 180 day period in the Schengen Area
Solomon Islands	Visa on arrival		
Somalia	Visa on arrival		Available at Berbera, Borama, Burao, Erigavo and Hargeisa airports.; 30 days, available at Bosaso Airport, Galcaio Airport and Mogadishu Airport.
South Africa	Visa not required	90 days	
South Sudan	Electronic Visa		Obtainable online; Printed visa authorization must be presented at the time of travel
Spain	Visa not required	90 days	90 days within any 180 day period in the Schengen Area
Sri Lanka	Electronic Travel Authorization	30 days	
Sudan	Visa required		
Suriname	Visa not required	90 days	An entrance fee of 50 USD or 50 Euros must be paid online prior to arrival.; Multiple entry eVisa is also available.
Sweden	Visa not required	90 days	90 days within any 180 day period in the Schengen Area
Switzerland	Visa not required	90 days	90 days within any 180 day period in the Schengen Area
Syria	Visa required		
Tajikistan	Visa required		
Tanzania	Visa on arrival		Visa not required for holders of Anguillian passport, British Virgin Islands passport, Bermudian passport, Caymanian passport and Turks and Caicos Islands passport.
Thailand	Visa required		
Timor-Leste	Visa on arrival	30 days	
Togo	Visa on arrival	7 days	
Tonga	Visa on arrival	31 days	
Trinidad and Tobago	Visa not required		
Tunisia	Visa not required	3 months	
Turkey	eVisa	90 days	
Turkmenistan	Visa required		
Tuvalu	Visa on arrival	1 month	
Uganda	Visa on arrival		May apply online. Can also be entered on a visa issued by Kenya or Rwanda.
Ukraine	Visa required		
United Arab Emirates	Visa required		Visa on arrival for holders of a Certificate of Entitlement to the Right of Abode.
United Kingdom	Visa not required		Visa not required for a visit of up to six months, or if the BOTC passport holder also has a British Citizen passport and/or a certificate of the right of abode. Otherwise, a visa is required for work, study, joining family or any other stay of more than six months.
United States	Visa required		Visa not required for holders of Bermudian passport and for holders of Caymanian passport and Turks and Caicos Islands passport arriving directly from the Cayman Islands or Turks and Caicos Islands and holding a current certificate from the Clerk of the Court, indicating no criminal record. British Virgin Islands passport holders can travel to United States Virgin Islands and then continue travel to other parts of the United States if they present a Certificate of Good Conduct issued by the Royal Virgin Islands Police Department indicating no criminal record.
Uruguay	Visa not required	90 days	
Uzbekistan	eVisa	30 days	Pre-approved visa can be picked up on arrival.
Vanuatu	Visa not required	30 days	
Vatican City	Visa not required		
Venezuela	Visa not required	90 days	
Vietnam	eVisa		A single entry eVisa valid for 30 days is available.
Yemen	Visa required		
Zambia	Visa not required	90 days	
Zimbabwe	eVisa		Visa not required for holders of Anguillian passport, Caymanian passport, Montserratian passport, Turks and Caicos Islands passport.

== British Crown Dependencies and Overseas Territories ==
Visitor to	Visa requirement	Allowed stay	Notes
British Crown Dependencies and Overseas Territories
Ascension Island	eVisa	3 months	3 months within any year period
Anguilla	Visa not required	3 months	British Overseas Territories citizens with a connection to the territory have right of abode.
Bermuda	Visa not required	6 months	British Overseas Territories citizens with a connection to the territory have right of abode.
British Antarctic Territory	Special permit required		
British Indian Ocean Territory	Special permit required		
British Virgin Islands	Visa not required	1 month	Extension of stay possible.; British Overseas Territories citizens with a connection to the territory have right of abode.
Cayman Islands	Visa not required	30 Days	The passenger must arrive directly from the United Kingdom.; British Overseas Territories citizens with a connection to the territory have right of abode.
Falkland Islands	Visitor's permit on arrival	4 weeks	The initial visitor's permit is valid for 4 weeks.; Visitors who have a connection with the Falkland Islands have right of abode.
Guernsey	Visa not required		
Isle of Man	Visa not required		Work or employment permit is required for persons without "Isle of Man worker" status.
Jersey	Visa not required		Work or employment permit is required.
Gibraltar	Visa not required		
Montserrat	Visa not required	6 months	British Overseas Territories citizens with a connection to the territory have right of abode.
Pitcairn Islands	Visa not required	14 days	Landing fee applies.
Saint Helena	Entry permit on arrival	183 days	The entry permit costs £25 and is issued on arrival.
South Georgia and the South Sandwich Islands	Permit required		Pre-arrival permit from the Commissioner required (72 hours/1 month for 110/160 pounds sterling).
Turks and Caicos Islands	Visa not required	90 days	British Overseas Territories citizens with a connection to the territory have right of abode.
Tristan da Cunha	Permission required		Permission to land required for 15/30 pounds sterling (yacht/ship passenger) for Tristan da Cunha Island or 20 pounds sterling for Gough Island, Inaccessible Island or Nightingale Islands, unless connection with Tristan da Cunha, in which case right of abode.

== Territories and disputed areas ==
Visitor to	Visa requirement	Notes (excluding departure fees)
Europe
Abkhazia	Visa required	
Mount Athos	Special permit required	Special permit required (4 days: 25 euro for Orthodox visitors, 35 euro for non-Orthodox visitors, 18 euro for students). There is a visitors' quota: maximum 100 Orthodox and 10 non-Orthodox per day and women are not allowed.
(Belarus) Belovezhskaya Pushcha National Park	Visa not required	3 days; must first obtain an electronic pass
(Autonomous Republic of Crimea) Crimea	Visa required	Visa policy of Russia applies de facto.
Turkish Republic of Northern Cyprus	Visa not required	3 months
(United Nations) UN Buffer Zone in Cyprus	Access Permit required	Access Permit is required for travelling inside the zone, except Civil Use Areas.
Faroe Islands	Visa not required	
(Norway) Jan Mayen	Permit required	Permit issued by the local police required for staying for less than 24 hours and permit issued by the Norwegian police for staying for more than 24 hours.
Jersey	Visa not required	
Kosovo	Visa not required	90 days
Novorossiya	Restricted area	Crossing from Ukraine requires visit purpose to be explained to Ukrainian passport control on exit and those who entered from Russia are not allowed to proceed further into Ukraine.
Russia	Special authorization required	Several closed cities and regions in Russia require special authorization.
South Ossetia	Visa not required	Multiple entry visa to Russia and three-day prior notification are required to enter South Ossetia.
Transnistria	Visa not required	Registration required after 24h.
Africa
Eritrea outside Asmara	Travel permit required	To travel in the rest of the country, a Travel Permit for Foreigners is required (20 Eritrean nakfa).
Mayotte	Visa not required	90 days
Réunion	Visa not required	90 days
Sahrawi Arab Democratic Republic		Visa not required up to 3 months.
Somaliland	Visa on arrival	30 days for 30 US dollars, payable on arrival.
Sudan	Travel permit required	All foreigners traveling more than 25 kilometers outside of Khartoum must obtain a travel permit.
(Sudan) Darfur	Travel permit required	Separate travel permit is required.
Asia
Hong Kong	Visa not required	3 months
India PAP/RAP	PAP/RAP required	Protected Area Permit (PAP) required for whole states of Nagaland and Sikkim and parts of states Manipur, Arunachal Pradesh, Uttarakhand, Jammu and Kashmir, Rajasthan, Himachal Pradesh. Restricted Area Permit (RAP) required for all of Andaman and Nicobar Islands and parts of Sikkim. Some of these requirements are occasionally lifted for a year.
Iraqi Kurdistan	Visa on arrival	15 days
Kazakhstan	Special permission required	Special permission required for the town of Baikonur and surrounding areas in Kyzylorda Oblast, and the town of Gvardeyskiy near Almaty.
(Iran) Kish Island	Visa not required	Tourists for Kish Island do not require a visa.
Macao	Visa not required	6 months
(Malaysia) Sabah and Sarawak	Visa not required	These states have their own immigration authorities and passport is required to travel to them, however the same visa applies.
Maldives	Permission required	With the exception of the capital Malé, tourists are generally prohibited from visiting non-resort islands without the express permission of the Government of Maldives.
North Korea outside Pyongyang	Special permit required	People are not allowed to leave the capital city, tourists can only leave the capital with a governmental tourist guide (no independent moving)
Palestine	Visa not required	Arrival by sea to Gaza Strip not allowed.
Taiwan	Visa required	
(Tajikistan) Gorno-Badakhshan Autonomous Province	OIVR permit required	OIVR permit required (15+5 Tajikistani Somoni) and another special permit (free of charge) is required for Lake Sarez.
Turkmenistan	Special permit required	A special permit, issued prior to arrival by Ministry of Foreign Affairs, is required if visiting the following places: Atamurat, Cheleken, Dashoguz, Serakhs and Serhetabat.
(United Nations) Korean Demilitarized Zone	Restricted zone	
(United Nations) UNDOF Zone and Ghajar	Restricted zone	
(Vietnam) Phú Quốc	Visa not required	Can visit without a visa for up to 30 days.
Yemen	Special permission required	Special permission needed for travel outside Sanaa or Aden.
Caribbean and North Atlantic
Aruba	Visa not required	30 days, extendable to 180 days
(Netherlands) Bonaire, St. Eustatius and Saba	Visa not required	90 days
(Colombia) San Andrés and Leticia	Tourist Card on arrival	Visitors arriving at Gustavo Rojas Pinilla International Airport and Alfredo Vásquez Cobo International Airport must buy tourist cards on arrival.
Curacao	Visa not required	3 months
(France) French Guiana	Visa not required	90 days
(France) French West Indies	Visa not required	90 days. French West Indies refers to Martinique, Guadeloupe, Saint Martin and Saint Barthélemy.
Greenland	Visa not required	
(Venezuela) Margarita Island	Visa not required	All visitors are fingerprinted.
Puerto Rico	Visa required	
Saint Pierre and Miquelon	Visa not required	
Sint Maarten	Visa not required	3 months
U.S. Virgin Islands	Visa required	
Oceania
American Samoa	Visa required	
(Australia) Ashmore and Cartier Islands	Special authorisation required	Special authorisation required.
(France) Clipperton Island	Special permit required	Special permit required.
Cook Islands	Visa not required	31 days
(Fiji) Lau Province	Special permission required	Special permission required.
French Polynesia	Visa not required	90 days
Guam	Visa not required	Visa not required under the Guam - CNMI Visa Waiver Program, for 45 days. Must also present a Hong Kong identity card.
New Caledonia	Visa not required	90 days
Niue	Visa on arrival	30 days
Northern Mariana Islands	Visa not required	Visa not required under the Guam - CNMI Visa Waiver Program, for 45 days. Must also present a Hong Kong identity card.
United States Minor Outlying Islands	Special permit required	Special permits required for Baker Island, Howland Island, Jarvis Island, Johnston Atoll, Kingman Reef, Midway Atoll, Palmyra Atoll and Wake Island.
Wallis and Futuna	Visa not required	90 days
South America
Galápagos	Pre-registration required	Online pre-registration is required. Transit Control Card must also be obtained at the airport prior to departure.
South Atlantic and Antarctica
Antarctica	Special permits required	Special permits required for French Southern and Antarctic Lands, Argentine Antarctica, (Australia) Australian Antarctic Territory, Bouvet Island, (Antártica Chilena Province) Chilean Antarctic Territory, (Australia) Heard Island and McDonald Islands, (Norway) Peter I Island, (Norway) Queen Maud Land, (New Zealand) Ross Dependency.

== Entry to the United Kingdom ==
BOTCs only have visa-free entry to the UK if they have a certificate of right of abode or if they have obtained and are travelling on a full British Citizen passport. Otherwise a visa is not required for a visit of up to six months, for example as a General Visitor or as a Short-Term Student, but a visa is required for other study, for work, for joining family or for any other stay of more than six months.

== Right to consular protection ==
Diplomatic missions of the United Kingdom

When in a country where there is no British embassy, British Overseas Territories citizens may get help from the embassy of any other Commonwealth country present in that country. There are also informal arrangements with some other countries, including Australia, to help British nationals in some countries.

See also List of diplomatic missions of the United Kingdom

== Non-visa restrictions ==
=== Blank passport pages ===
Many countries require a minimum number of blank pages to be available in the passport being presented, typically one or two pages. Endorsement pages, which often appear after the visa pages, are not counted as being valid or available.

=== Vaccination ===
Cover of the new International Certificate of Vaccination issued by the Bureau of Quarantine in the Philippines since 2021

The African countries of Angola, Benin, Burkina Faso, Burundi, Cameroon, Central African Republic, Democratic Republic of the Congo, Republic of the Congo, Côte d'Ivoire, Gabon, Ghana, Guinea-Bissau, Mali, Niger, Sierra Leone and Togo, South Sudan and Uganda, along with French Guiana in South America, require all incoming passengers older than nine months to one year, to have a current International Certificate of Vaccination or Prophylaxis.

Some other countries require vaccination only if the passenger is coming from an infected area or has visited one recently or has transited for 12 hours in those countries: Algeria, Botswana, Cabo Verde, Chad, Djibouti, Egypt, Eswatini, Ethiopia, Gambia, Ghana, Guinea, Lesotho, Libya, Equatorial Guinea, Eritrea, Madagascar, Malawi, Mauritania, Mauritius, Mozambique, Namibia, Nigeria, Papua New Guinea, Seychelles, Somalia, South Africa, Sudan, Tunisia, Uganda, Tanzania, Zambia and Zimbabwe.

=== Passport validity length ===
Very few countries, such as Paraguay, just require a valid passport on arrival.

However many countries and groupings now require only an identity card – especially from their neighbours. Other countries may have special bilateral arrangements that depart from the generality of their passport validity length policies to shorten the period of passport validity required for each other's citizens or even accept passports that have already expired (but not been cancelled).

Some countries, such as Japan, Ireland and the United Kingdom, require a passport valid throughout the period of the intended stay.

In the absence of specific bilateral agreements, countries requiring passports to be valid for at least 6 more months on arrival include Afghanistan, Algeria, Anguilla, Bahrain, Bhutan, Botswana, British Virgin Islands, Brunei, Cambodia, Cameroon, Cape Verde, Cayman Islands, Central African Republic, Chad, Comoros, Costa Rica, Côte d'Ivoire, Curaçao, Ecuador, Egypt, El Salvador, Equatorial Guinea, Fiji, Gabon, Guinea Bissau, Guyana, Haiti, India, Indonesia, Iran, Iraq, Israel, Jordan, Kenya, Kiribati, Kuwait, Laos, Madagascar, Malaysia, Marshall Islands, Mongolia, Myanmar, Namibia, Nepal, Nicaragua, Nigeria, Oman, Palau, Papua New Guinea, Peru, Philippines, Qatar, Rwanda, Samoa, Saudi Arabia, Singapore, Solomon Islands, Somalia, Sri Lanka, Sudan, Suriname, Tanzania, Thailand, Timor-Leste, Tokelau, Tonga, Turkey, Tuvalu, Uganda, United Arab Emirates, Vanuatu, Venezuela, and Vietnam.

Countries requiring passports valid for at least 4 months on arrival include Micronesia and Zambia.

Countries requiring passports with a validity of at least 3 months beyond the date of intended departure include Azerbaijan, Bosnia and Herzegovina, Honduras, Montenegro, Nauru, Moldova and New Zealand. Similarly, the EEA countries of Iceland, Liechtenstein, Norway, all European Union countries (except Ireland) together with Switzerland also require 3 months validity beyond the date of the bearer's intended departure unless the bearer is an EEA or Swiss national.

Countries requiring passports valid for at least 3 months on arrival include Albania, North Macedonia, Panama, and Senegal.

Bermuda requires passports to be valid for at least 45 days upon entry.

Countries that require a passport validity of at least one month beyond the date of intended departure include Eritrea, Hong Kong, Lebanon, Macau, the Maldives and South Africa.

==== Maximum passport age ====
Countries of the Schengen area require non-EU passports to be less than 10 years old upon entry.

=== Criminal record ===
Some countries, including Australia, Canada, Fiji, New Zealand and the United States, routinely deny entry to non-citizens who have a criminal record, while others impose restrictions depending on the type of conviction and the length of the sentence.

=== Persona non grata ===
The government of a country can declare a diplomat persona non grata, banning them from entering the country or expelling them if they have already entered. In non-diplomatic use, the authorities of a country may also declare a foreigner persona non grata permanently or temporarily, usually because of unlawful activity.

=== Israeli stamps ===
Kuwait, Lebanon, Libya, and Yemen do not allow entry to people with passport stamps from Israel or whose passports have either a used or an unused Israeli visa, or where there is evidence of previous travel to Israel such as entry or exit stamps from neighbouring border posts in transit countries such as Jordan and Egypt.

To circumvent this Arab League boycott of Israel, the Israeli immigration services have now mostly ceased to stamp foreign nationals' passports on either entry to or exit from Israel (unless the entry is for some work-related purposes). Since 15 January 2013, Israel no longer stamps foreign passports at Ben Gurion Airport. Passports are still (as of 22 June 2017) stamped at Erez when passing into and out of Gaza.

Iran refuses admission to holders of passports containing an Israeli visa or stamp that is less than 12 months old.

=== Biometrics ===
Several countries mandate that all travellers, or all foreign travellers, be fingerprinted on arrival and will refuse admission to or even arrest travellers who refuse to comply. In some countries, such as the United States, this may apply even to transit passengers who merely wish to change planes rather than go landside.

Fingerprinting countries/regions include Afghanistan, Argentina, Brunei, Cambodia, China, Ethiopia, Ghana, Guinea, India, Japan, Kenya (both fingerprints and a photo are taken), Malaysia upon entry and departure, Mongolia, Saudi Arabia, the Schengen Area, Singapore, South Korea, Taiwan, Thailand, Uganda, the United Arab Emirates and the United States.

Many countries also require a photo be taken of people entering the country. The United States, which does not fully implement exit control formalities at its land frontiers (although long mandated by its own legislation), intends to implement facial recognition for passengers departing from international airports to identify people who overstay their visa.

Together with fingerprint and face recognition, iris scanning is one of three biometric identification technologies internationally standardised since 2006 by the International Civil Aviation Organization (ICAO) for use in e-passports and the United Arab Emirates conducts iris scanning on visitors who need to apply for a visa. The United States Department of Homeland Security has announced plans to greatly increase the biometric data it collects at US borders. In 2018, Singapore began trials of iris scanning at three land and maritime immigration checkpoints.

== Fingerprinting ==
Several countries including Argentina, Cambodia, Japan, Malaysia, Saudi Arabia, South Korea and the United States demand all adult passengers (age varies by country) to be fingerprinted on arrival.

== Foreign travel statistics ==
The following data from the Office for National Statistics Travel Trends database estimate the number of visits made by UK residents abroad to most-visited countries in the year 2024.

Country	Number of visits (thousands)
Canada	657
United States	4,055
Austria	844
Belgium	1,428
Bulgaria	624
Czechia	671
Cyprus	1,289
Denmark	874
Finland	225
France	9,347
Germany	3,244
Greece	3,777
Hungary	831
Republic of Ireland	3,626
Italy	4,839
Lithuania	404
Luxembourg	119
Malta	743
Netherlands	2,688
Norway	593
Poland	2,926
Portugal	3,685
Romania	1,644
Russia	19
Slovakia	270
Spain	17,771
Sweden	551
Switzerland	1,039
Turkey	4,081
Egypt	771
Morocco	1,243
Tunisia	300
South Africa	345
Nigeria	251
Israel	89
United Arab Emirates	1,401
Hong Kong	368
China (excluding Hong Kong)	620
India	2,053
Japan	373
Pakistan	625
Sri Lanka	178
Thailand	593
Australia	564
New Zealand	160
Barbados	180
Jamaica	259
Brazil	209
Mexico	567

== See also ==
- Visa policy of the British Overseas Territories
- Visa requirements for British citizens
- Visa requirements for British Overseas Citizens
- Visa requirements for British Nationals (Overseas)
- British Overseas Territories Citizens in the United Kingdom
