= British passport (Bermuda) =

British Overseas Territory passport

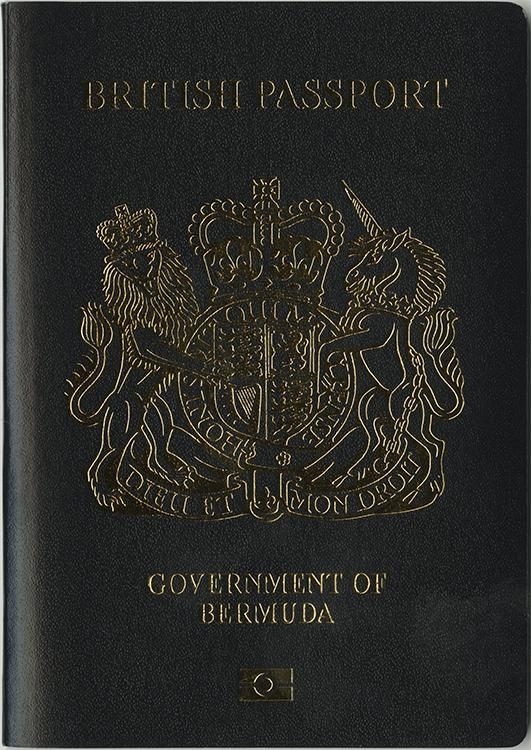
- The front cover of a Series C Bermudian passport.
- Type: Passport
- Issued by: HM Passport Office (via the Bermuda passport office)
- Eligibility: British Overseas Territories citizenship

British passports previously issued by the Department of Immigration of the Government of the British Overseas Territory of Bermuda on behalf of His Majesty's Passport Office of the Government of the United Kingdom (a practice which ended in June 2016, since which time all British passports are issued only by HM Passport Office), differed from those issued in the United Kingdom and elsewhere in having "Government of Bermuda" added to the outside of the front cover, and the request from His Britannic Majesty's Secretary of State in the Name of His Majesty The King, which is printed on the inside of the cover of passports issued by the UK Government, replaced with the same request from the Governor of Bermuda as the competent authority in this behalf, in the Name of His Majesty The King.

== History ==
Often erroneously described as a Bermuda Passport, this is identical to the passports issued in other British Overseas Territories except for minor differences referencing Bermuda.

All recipients of new or replacement British passports issued in Bermuda, prior to 2002, received this passport, whether they possessed Bermudian status or not. The citizenship of the holder was indicated by rubber stamp in the appropriate field inside the passport. Prior to 1983, the citizenship for British citizens from the United Kingdom or the colonies was Citizen of the United Kingdom and Colonies. After 1983, when citizens in the United Kingdom became British Citizens, colonials became British Dependent Territories Citizens, losing the right of abode in the United Kingdom unless already settled in, having been born in, or having a parent who had been born in, the United Kingdom proper. This type of British Citizenship did not entitle the holder to right of abode in any British Dependent Territory, including Bermuda. Bermudian status was indicated by the addition of (Bermuda) after British Dependent Territories Citizen on the rubber stamp). Prior to 2002, it was not legal for a person to hold two British passports. A person who possessed both Bermudian status and right of abode (or settled status) in the United Kingdom could have both indicated in the same passport. A British citizen who did not possess Bermudian status would receive the supposedly Bermudian passport if obtaining it in Bermuda, with the citizenship stamped as "British Citizen" only (unless the holder also possessed status in another territory or held yet another type of British Citizenship). Those who held neither Bermudian status nor the right of abode in the United Kingdom, but who were entitled to a British Passport would also receive the "Bermudian" Passport in Bermuda, with the appropriate citizenship stamped inside. Before 1983, a Bermudian Citizen of the United Kingdom and Colonies, and, after 1983, a British Dependent Territories Citizen with Bermudian status who did not possess the right of abode in the United Kingdom, who obtained a British Passport in the United Kingdom, or at a United Kingdom Consulate in a foreign country, received a normal British Passport (not the Bermudian passport) with the appropriate citizenship rubber-stamped inside.

In 1988, when the blue British Passports were replaced with a burgundy one of a common European Union pattern, the passports issued in the British Dependent Territories were changed accordingly (entitlement to free movement in the European Union was indicated only on the United Kingdom type passports, with EUROPEAN UNION added above UNITED KINGDOM OF GREAT BRITAIN AND NORTHERN IRELAND on the outside of the front cover, while the Bermudian passport reads only BRITISH PASSPORT).

In 2002, British Dependent Territories Citizenship was re-named British Overseas Territories Citizenship, remaining as the default citizenship for British citizens born in what was at the same time re-designated the British Overseas Territories, and the barriers that had been put in place in 1983 to end free movement of most British Dependent Territories Citizens (excepting Falkland Islanders and later Gibraltarians) into the United Kingdom were removed. British Overseas Territories Citizens were also entitled to obtain British Citizenship by obtaining a normal British Passport with the citizenship stamped as British Citizen. The restriction against holding more than one British passport was removed. The Department of Immigration was no longer permitted to issue new or replacement passports except for British Overseas Citizenship holders. The citizenship for these was entered only as British Overseas Territories Citizen. Bermudian status was stamped in separately on one of the internal pages. Without the stamp indicating that the passport holder is registered as a Bermudian, a Bermudian Passport with the citizenship entered as British Overseas Territories Citizen is not sufficient to identify the holder as a Bermudian. The endorsement indicating the holder has Bermudian status can be stamped into any British Passport, with the citizenship entered as either 'British Overseas Territories Citizen or 'British Citizen. As the Bermudian passport still lacked EUROPEAN UNION on the front cover, and used the country code BMU in the Machine Readable Zone (MRZ) inside instead of the GBR indicated in the British Citizen/United Kingdom passport, it is not necessarily accepted in other European Union countries as entitling the holder to free movement within the European Union. As a consequence, the only practical reason a Bermudian would obtain the Bermudian passport, whether in addition or in preference to the normal British passport with Bermudian status stamped inside, was for the purpose of entering the United States of America, which has lower entry restrictions on Bermudians than on other British nationals, but specifies they must present a British Passport with Government of Bermuda on the front, citizenship entered as either British Dependent Territories Citizen or British Overseas Territories Citizen, and the endorsement stamped to show the holder has been registered as a Bermudian.

Because the HM Passport Office in the UK became the sole issuer of all British passports in 2016, only the normal (UK-type) British Passport is issued, regardless the type of British Citizenship entered. Bermuda Immigration enters the Bermudian status stamp separately (passports applied for in Bermuda can be obtained by handing the application to the Department of Immigration in Bermuda, which forwards it to the HM Passport office and receives it back on behalf of the applicant).

Since 2024, the BMU code has been reinstated on Bermudian BOTC passports. The GBR code, which had been present as the issuing state and MRZ on all British passports, had caused confusions at ports of entry for many Bermudians when travelling to Bermuda's nearest neighbour, the United States. Passports had not been required for United States Citizens and Bermudians travelling between the United states and Bermuda until 2001, but following the al-Qaeda attacks on the United States that year, the United States law was changed to require everyone who entered the United States, including its own citizens, to have a passport (as United States visitors to Bermuda therefore would not have been permitted to return to the United States without a passport, Bermuda was obliged to also require passports from visitors from the United States). The United States wrote its passport requirements for Bermudians to enter the United states as Bermudians around the British Government's passports for Bermudians as they existed in 2001, enabling Bermudians to enter the United States without a visa or an Electronic System for Travel Authorization (ESTA). As long as Bermudians were provided passports that met the United States entry requirements, this was not an issue, but the change to the GBR code on Bermudians' passports led meant that one of these documents was required.

== Application ==
Adult applicants can apply for a standard Bermudian ePassport at a cost of US$160. The cost of the application for child applicants is US$80.

Since 2016, all Bermudian passports are printed in the United Kingdom, rather than Bermuda.

== Passport statement ==
The inside cover of Bermudian passports contains the following words in English only:

On behalf of His Majesty's Secretary of State the Governor of this British Territory requests in the name of His Majesty requests and requires all those whom it may concern to allow the bearer to pass freely without let or hindrance, and to afford such assistance and protection as may be necessary.

== Travel ==
=== United States ===
British Overseas Territories citizens with a connection to Bermuda can enter the United States visa-free under most circumstances. To qualify, they must present a Bermudian passport which fulfils the following criteria:

- The front cover has printed on it "Government of Bermuda"
- The holder's nationality must be stated as either "British Overseas Territories Citizen" or "British Dependent Territories Citizen"
- The passport must contain one of the following endorsement stamps: "Holder is registered as a Bermudian", "Holder Possesses Bermudian Status" or "Holder is deemed to possess Bermudian status"

Alternatively, if Bermudians use their British Citizen passports, when entering the US on the Visa Waiver Program, they can only stay visa-free for up to 90 days and must obtain pre-arrival online authorisation (at a fee of US$40).

=== Mexico ===
Travellers with Bermudian passports are allowed visa-free entry to Mexico. No other British Overseas Territory passport allows visa-free entry to Mexico.

== See also ==
- Visa requirements for British Overseas Territories Citizens
- Bermudian passport information on PRADO
