= British passport (Cayman Islands) =

Passport

Caymanian passport
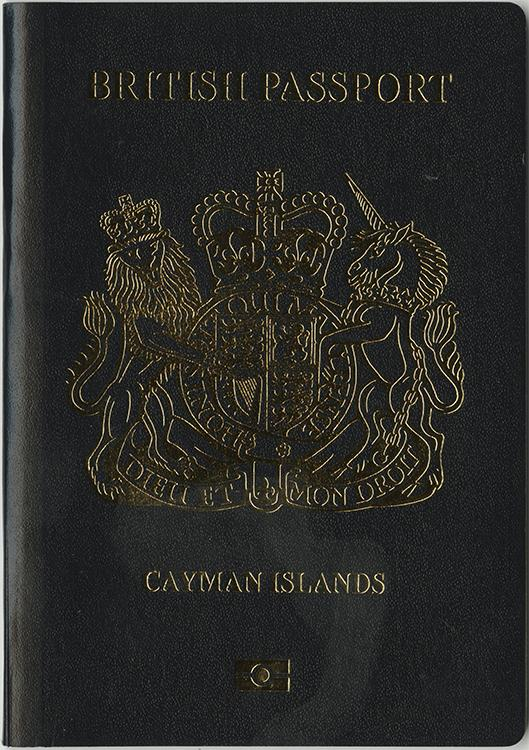
- The front cover of a Series C Caymanian passport
- Type: Passport
- Issued by: HM Passport Office (via the British Virgin Islands passport office)
- Eligibility: British Overseas Territories citizens connected to the Cayman Islands
- Expiration: 10 years for adults aged 16 or over, 5 years for children

Cayman Islands passports are a variant of the British passport which are issued to British Overseas Territories Citizens connected to the Cayman Islands. Since 2016, all Caymanian passports are issued in the United Kingdom by His Majesty's Passport Office (HMPO).

Following the introduction of the Series C British Passport, Caymanian passports, along with the other Overseas Territories, will adopt the new blue design.

== Caymanian status ==
As Cayman Islands passports are issued to any BOTC with a connection to the islands, it does not necessarily confer belonger status. As such Cayman Islands passports do not confer to anyone a right to live in, work in or even enter the Cayman Islands.

== See also ==
- Visa requirements for British Overseas Territories Citizens
- Visa & Passport Photos That Meet Requirements
- Cayman passport information on PRADO
