= British passport (Saint Helena) =

Passport issued to inhabitants of St Helena

Saint Helena passport
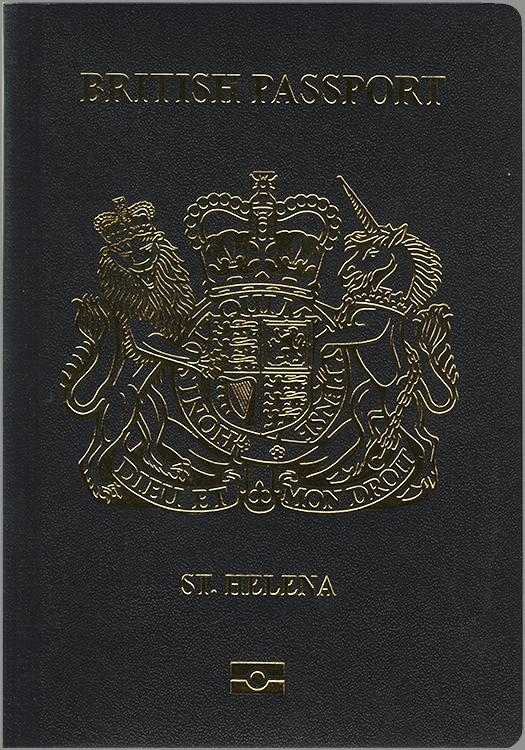
- The front cover of a Series C British passport issued in Saint Helena.
- Type: Passport
- Issued by: HM Passport Office (via the Saint Helena passport office)
- Eligibility: British Overseas Territories citizenship

Saint Helena passports are issued to St Helenians, a unique status recognised by the Government of St Helena, and gained through birth, descent, or application. Those holding this status are British Overseas Territories Citizens connected to Saint Helena, formerly known as British Dependent Territories Citizens.

== Types ==
Since 2014 St Helena passports have been biometric, and are therefore printed in the United Kingdom, where appropriate production facilities exist. However, the St Helena passport office has retained facilities to print non-biometric passports, and does so in cases of emergency (notably urgent travel requirements for medical reasons), owing to the time delay in requesting production of passports in the United Kingdom and their transport to St Helena.

== Passport statement ==
St. Helena passports contain on their inside cover the following words in English only:

On behalf of His Majesty's Secretary of State the Governor of this British Territory requests in the name of His Majesty all those whom it may concern to allow the bearer to pass freely without let or hindrance, and to afford such assistance and protection as may be necessary.

== See also ==
- Visa requirements for British Overseas Territories Citizens
