= Anguillian passport =

Passport issued to inhabitants of Anguilla

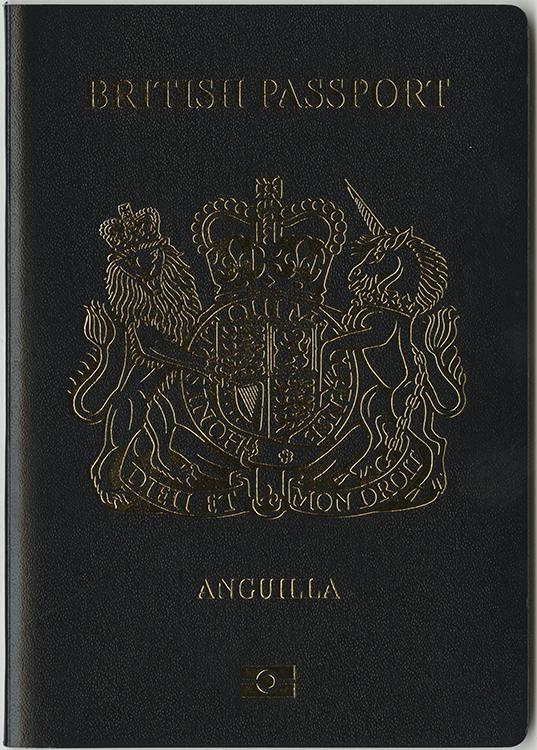
- The front cover of a Series C Anguillian passport
- Type: Passport
- Issued by: HM Passport Office (via the Anguilla passport office)
- Eligibility: British Overseas Territories citizens with a connection to Anguilla
- Expiration: 10 years after acquisition for adult aged 16 or over, 5 years for children

The Anguillian passport is a British passport issued to British Overseas Territories citizens with a connection to Anguilla. From 2015, all Anguillian passports are issued by His Majesty's Passport Office in the United Kingdom.

== Passport statement ==
Anguillian passports contain on their inside cover the following words in English:

On behalf of His Majesty's Secretary of State the Governor of this British Territory requests in the name of His Majesty all those whom it may concern to allow the bearer to pass freely without let or hindrance, and to afford such assistance and protection as may be necessary.

== See also ==
- Visa requirements for British Overseas Territories Citizens
