= British passport (Turks and Caicos Islands) =

Passport

Turks and Caicos Islands passport
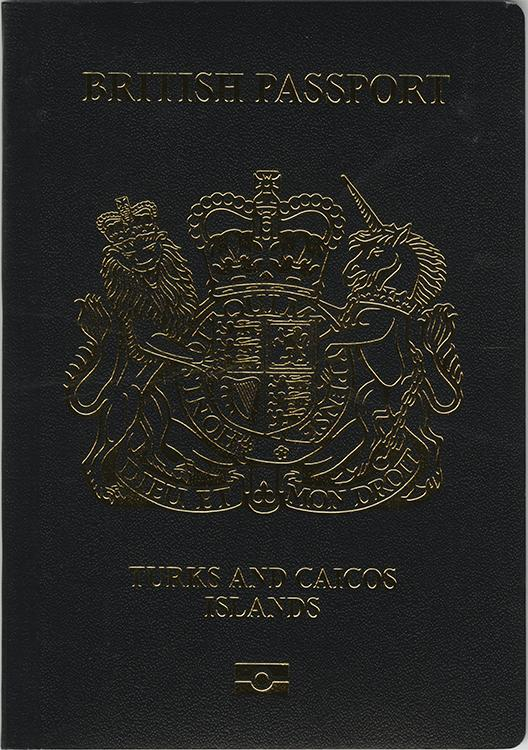
- The front cover of a Series C Turks and Caicos Islands passport.
- Type: Passport
- Issued by: HM Passport Office (via the Turks and Caicos Islands passport office)
- Eligibility: British Overseas Territories citizens connected to the Turks and Caicos Islands
- Expiration: 10 years for adults aged 16 or over, 5 years for children

The Turks and Caicos Islands passport is a British passport issued to British Overseas Territories citizens with a connection to the Turks and Caicos Islands.

== Passport statement ==
Turks and Caicos Islands passports contain on their inside cover the following words in English:

On behalf of His Majesty's Secretary of State the Governor of this British Territory requests in the name of His Majesty all those whom it may concern to allow the bearer to pass freely without let or hindrance, and to afford such assistance and protection as may be necessary.

== Travel ==
British Overseas Territories Citizens with a connection to the Turks and Caicos Islands can enter the United States with a police certificate issued by the Turks and Caicos Islands for short business and pleasure. To qualify, they must not have had a criminal conviction or ineligibility, violated U.S. immigration laws in the past and must arrive in the United States and have the right to abode in the Turks and Caicos Islands. In addition to a valid, unexpired passport, all travellers 14 years of age or older with the old style passport must present a police certificate issued by the Royal Turks and Caicos Islands Police Force within the past six months.

All British Overseas Territories citizens with a connection to the Turks and Caicos Islands must hold a British passport that is valid for more than six (6) months to travel to the United States.

== See also ==
- Visa requirements for British Overseas Territories Citizens
