= British passport (Montserrat) =

Passport issued to British citizens in Montserrat

Montserratian passport
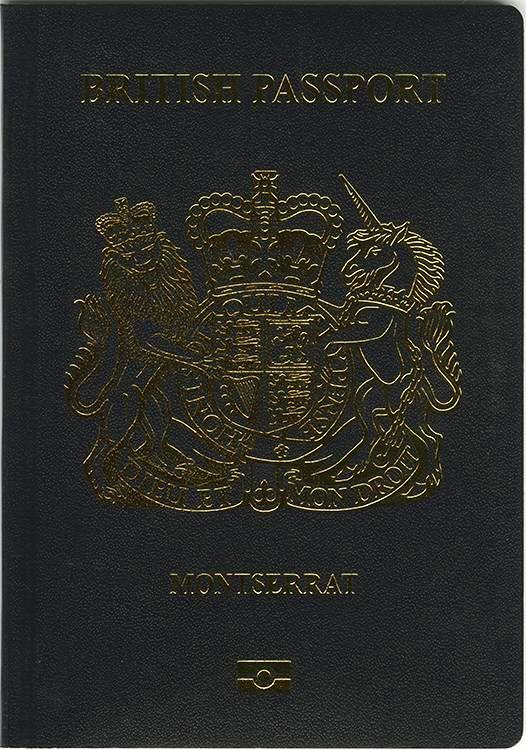
- Front cover of a Series C British Montserrat passport
- Type: Passport
- Issued by: HM Passport Office (via the Montserrat passport office)
- Eligibility: British Overseas Territories citizens connected to the Montserrat
- Expiration: 10 years for adults aged 16 or over, 5 years for children

The British passport (Montserrat) issued to British Overseas Territory Citizens who live in, or have a connection (for example by birth, naturalisation or by descent) with Montserrat. From 2015, all Montserratian passports are issued by HM Passport Office in the United Kingdom. Although Montserrat is a full member of the Caribbean Community, its passport does not conform to the CARICOM passport common design.

== Passport statement ==
Montserratian passports contain on their inside cover the following words in English only:

On behalf of His Majesty's Secretary of State the Governor of this British Territory requests in the name of His Majesty all those whom it may concern to allow the bearer to pass freely without let or hindrance, and to afford such assistance and protection as may be necessary.

== See also ==
- Visa requirements for British Overseas Territories Citizens of Montserrat
