= British passport (British Virgin Islands) =

Passport document

Virgin Islands passport
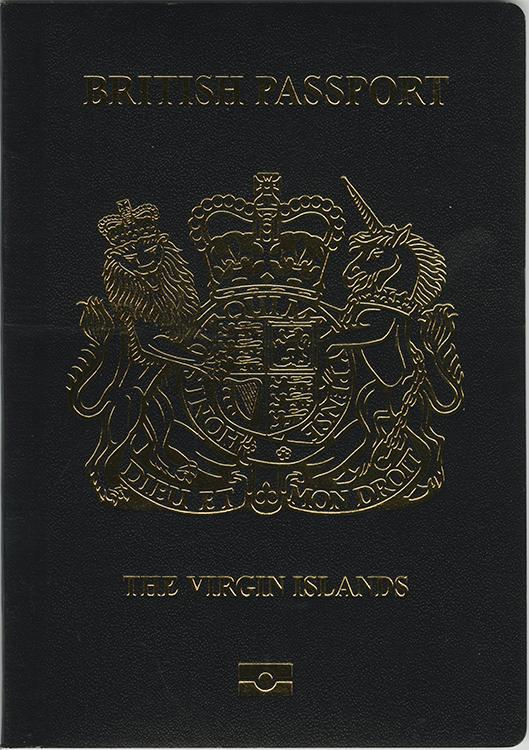
- The front cover of a Series C British Virgin Islands passport.
- Type: Passport
- Issued by: HM Passport Office (via the British Virgin Islands passport office)
- Eligibility: British Overseas Territories citizens connected to the British Virgin Islands
- Expiration: 10 years for adults aged 16 or over, 5 years for children

The British Virgin Islands passport is a British passport issued to British Overseas Territories citizens with a connection to the British Virgin Islands.

== Passport statement ==
British Virgin Islands passports contain on their inside cover the following words in English only:

On behalf of His Majesty's Secretary of State the Governor of this British Territory requests in the name of His Majesty all those whom it may concern to allow the bearer to pass freely without let or hindrance, and to afford such assistance and protection as may be necessary.

== Physical appearance ==
The British Virgin Islands passport includes the following data:

- Photo of Passport Holder
- Type (P for passport)
- Code of Issuing State (GBR)
- Passport number
- Name
- Nationality (British Overseas Territories Citizen)
- Date of Birth
- Sex
- Place of Birth
- Date of issue
- Holder's signature
- Date of expiry
- Authority

== See also ==
- Visa requirements for British Overseas Territories Citizens
- British Virgin Islander passport information on PRADO
