= British Overseas citizen =

Type of British national associated with former colonies

A British Overseas citizen (BOC) is a holder of a residual class of British nationality, largely held by people connected with former British colonies who do not have close ties to the United Kingdom or its overseas territories. Individuals with this form of nationality are British nationals and Commonwealth citizens, but not British citizens. BOCs are subject to immigration control when entering the United Kingdom and do not have the automatic right of abode there or in any British overseas territory.

This nationality gives its holders a limited set of rights when they are resident in the United Kingdom, conferring eligibility to vote, to obtain citizenship under a simplified process, and to serve in public office or non-reserved government positions. As of 2025, about 9,100 BOCs hold valid British passports with this status and enjoy consular protection when travelling abroad. However, BOCs who do not have leave to remain in the UK nor the overseas territories and have no other citizenship are de facto stateless as they are not guaranteed the right to enter the country of which they are nationals.

== Acquisition and loss ==
Becoming a British Overseas citizen today is generally not possible. The status cannot be acquired by naturalisation and can only be transferred by descent if an individual born to a BOC parent would otherwise be stateless. Almost all individuals with this status obtained it in 1983, when Citizens of the United Kingdom and Colonies without right of abode in the United Kingdom or ties to remaining British overseas territories were reclassified as British Overseas citizens. Due to the broad nature of the governing Acts that determine CUKC and BOC eligibility, there are a variety of circumstances in which an individual could have acquired BOC status. These include:

- CUKCs connected with a former colony or protectorate who did not acquire that country's citizenship on independence (applicable particularly to some former colonies, such as Kenya and Aden); connection in this context generally means having acquired CUKC status by birth or naturalisation in a qualified territory, or by birth to a father or grandfather who fulfilled those requirements
- persons who became citizens of a newly independent country, but remained CUKCs (applicable to the former Straits Settlements of Penang and Malacca, as well as Cyprus)
- persons who became citizens of a newly independent country, but remained CUKCs based on a connection to another colony which subsequently became independent before 1983
- British Dependent Territories Citizens (BDTCs) connected with Hong Kong who failed to register for British National (Overseas) status and would otherwise have been stateless after the transfer of sovereignty to China on 1 July 1997
- British subjects connected with Burma who made declarations to retain that status after independence in 1948
- women who acquired CUKC by marriage on or after 28 October 1971
- minor children who acquired CUKC by registration at the British high commission of an independent Commonwealth country on or after 28 October 1971
- eligible descendants of Sophia of Hanover who have never been members of the Catholic Church.

It is expected that BOCs will obtain citizenship in the country they reside in and that the number of active status holders will eventually dwindle until there are none. Several early independence acts did not remove CUKC status from certain citizens of newly independent states. In the former Straits Settlements of Penang and Malacca, around one million Straits Chinese were allowed to continue as CUKCs with Malayan citizenship when the Federation of Malaya became independent in 1957. Consequently, when Malaya merged with North Borneo, Sarawak, and Singapore to form Malaysia in 1963, CUKC status was not rescinded from individuals already holding Malayan citizenship. Similarly, when Cyprus became independent in 1960, Cypriots who were not resident in Cyprus for the five years leading up to independence and were also living in another Commonwealth country would not have lost CUKC status.

In some cases, a former colony's new government only granted citizenship to members of the majority ethnic group. When Aden became part of the newly independent South Yemen in 1967, individuals who were not of Arab ancestry did not acquire Yemeni citizenship and remained CUKCs. Likewise, Hong Kong residents lost BDTC status when that territory was transferred to China in 1997. Residents choosing to retain British nationality were able to voluntarily register for British National (Overseas) status before the handover. Individuals who were not ethnically Chinese did not acquire Chinese nationality on that date and automatically became BOCs if they would have been made stateless.

Sophia of Hanover was placed in the English line of succession in 1705 to avoid a reigning Catholic monarch. Because she was German, Parliament passed an Act to naturalise the Electress as an English subject, along with all of her lineal descendants. Although the British Nationality Act 1948 ended the naturalisation of further direct descendants, eligible non-Catholic persons born before 1949 would have already become British subjects. Those individuals would also be able to transmit British nationality to at least one further generation. Because such persons would not automatically have the right of abode in the United Kingdom, some current claimants to British nationality through the Sophia Naturalization Act 1705 could receive British Overseas citizenship.

British Overseas citizenship can be relinquished by a declaration made to the Home Secretary, provided that an individual already possesses or intends to acquire another nationality. BOC status may also be deprived if it was fraudulently acquired. There is no path to restore BOC status once lost.

== Background ==
From 1949 to 1983, all legal inhabitants of the British Empire held a common nationality. Citizens of the United Kingdom and Colonies (CUKCs) initially held an automatic right to enter and live in the UK. This entitlement was given to all British subjects (the pre-1949 nationality status), which included CUKCs and citizens of independent countries in the Commonwealth of Nations, as part of a wider initiative to preserve close relationships with the four original British Dominions (Australia, Canada, New Zealand and South Africa) and Southern Rhodesia, and to moderate nationalist attitudes within the Commonwealth.

Non-white immigrants were systemically discouraged from entering the UK, though there was no legal limitation to their migration. The Colonial Office ordered colonial governments to hinder prospective migrants of colour by informing them of the difficulties they would face in finding housing accommodation and employment in Britain, as well as confiscating passports from those who were deemed to have insufficient funds or determined to be unemployable. Nevertheless, 500,000 of these new immigrants had settled in the UK by 1962. Immigration from the colonies and Commonwealth nation-states was formally restricted by Parliament from 1962 to 1971, when British subjects originating from outside of the British Isle first had immigration controls officially imposed on them when entering the United Kingdom.

As Britain withdrew from most of its remaining overseas possessions as part of decolonisation, some former colonial subjects remained CUKCs despite the independence of their colonies. After passage of the British Nationality Act 1981, CUKCs were reclassified in 1983 into different nationality groups based on their ancestry, birthplace, and immigration status: CUKCs who had right of abode in the United Kingdom became British Citizens while those connected with a remaining colony became British Dependent Territories Citizens (BDTCs). Remaining CUKCs who were no longer associated with a British territory became British Overseas Citizens. An estimated 1.5 million people were reclassified as BOCs in 1983, 1.3 million of whom also held another nationality.

=== Debate over full citizenship rights ===
The creation of different British nationality classes with disparities in United Kingdom residency rights drew criticism for creating what was seen as a two-tier system. The vast majority of people who were classified as British Citizens in 1983 were white, while those assigned BDTC or BOC status were predominantly South Asian. The deprivation of full nationality rights was particularly distressful for the Indian diaspora in Southeast Africa, many of whom migrated to Africa during colonial rule while working in the civil service. As former East African colonies gained independence, aggressive Africanisation policies and an increasingly discriminatory environment in the post-colonial countries against the South Asian population caused many among them to seek migration to Britain. While CUKCs without strong ties to the British Isle were already subject to immigration controls starting in 1962, the subdivision of nationality reinforced the idea that British identity depended on race.

A "special quota voucher scheme" was introduced in 1968 to annually admit a small number of CUKCs (and later BOCs), along with their dependents, who held no other nationality and who were pressured to leave their countries of residence. Waiting times under the quota system were extremely long, with applicants waiting in excess of five years to receive a voucher to enter the UK. The system was abolished in 2002, when Parliament granted remaining BOCs who held no other nationality the right to register as full British Citizens. About 35,000 BOCs were estimated to have benefited from this provision at the time of the law's passage.

Prior to 2002, British Overseas Citizens from Malaysia had been able to petition for British citizenship after renouncing Malaysian citizenship. After passage of the British Overseas Territories Act 2002 and the Nationality, Immigration and Asylum Act 2002, these requests were no longer considered. However, a number of Malaysian BOCs continued their applications after this change in immigration policy and renounced their Malaysian citizenship after being given incorrect legal advice. Due to differences in how the governments recognise nationality renunciation, both the British and Malaysian governments consider this group of individuals nationals of the other country and refuse to give them any form of permanent status. Debate over ultimate responsibility for this group of BOCs (estimated to be 1,000–2,000 people) continues while they remain stateless without a territory that they have a guaranteed right to remain in.

== Rights and privileges ==
British Overseas citizens are exempted from obtaining a visa or entry certificate when visiting the United Kingdom for less than six months. They are eligible to apply for two-year working holiday visas and do not face annual quotas or sponsorship requirements. When travelling in other countries, they may seek British consular protection. BOCs are not considered foreign nationals when residing in the UK and are entitled to certain rights as Commonwealth citizens. These include exemption from registration with local police, voting eligibility in UK elections, and the ability to enlist in the British Armed Forces. British Overseas citizens are also eligible to serve in non-reserved Civil Service posts, be granted British honours, receive peerages, and sit in the House of Lords. If given indefinite leave to remain (ILR), they are eligible to stand for election to the House of Commons and local government. ILR status usually expires if an individual leaves the UK and remains abroad for over two years, but this limitation does not apply to BOCs. Prior to 2002, BOCs who entered the UK on a work permit were automatically given indefinite leave to remain.

BOCs may become British citizens by registration, rather than naturalisation, after residing in the United Kingdom for more than five years and possessing ILR for more than one year. Registration confers citizenship otherwise than by descent, meaning that children born outside of the UK to those successfully registered will be British citizens by descent. Becoming a British citizen has no effect on BOC status; BOCs may also simultaneously be British citizens. BOCs who were Hong Kong residents and had no other nationality on 3 February 1997 may also register for citizenship without UK residence requirements. Applicants who successfully register in this way become British citizens by descent and cannot pass citizenship to their children born outside of the UK. Remaining BOCs who do not hold and have not lost any other nationality on or after 4 July 2002 are entitled to register as British citizens. As of 2025, there are about 9,100 people who continue to be BOCs and hold valid British passports with the status.

== Restrictions ==
BOCs who hold no other nationality are de facto stateless because they are deprived of entering the country that claims them as nationals. The Nationality, Immigration and Asylum Act 2002 allowed these individuals to register as British citizens, after which statelessness was generally resolved for people who were solely BOCs. However, there remain circumstances in which BOCs are effectively stateless after 4 July 2002, including:

- a BOC is also a citizen of a country that considers acquisition of a foreign passport to be grounds for citizenship deprivation (e.g. Malaysia). A Malaysian-BOC dual national applying for a BOC passport would consequently have their Malaysian citizenship deprived.
- a BOC is also a citizen of a country that only permits dual citizenship for minors and requires renunciation of all other nationalities before a certain age (e.g. Japan). A Japanese-BOC dual national would potentially have their Japanese citizenship revoked at age 22

=== United Kingdom ===
British Overseas citizens are subject to immigration controls and have neither the right of abode or the right to work in the United Kingdom. BOCs are required to pay an immigration health surcharge to access National Health Service benefits when residing in the UK for longer than six months.

=== European Union ===
Before the United Kingdom withdrew from the European Union on 31 January 2020, full British citizens were European Union citizens. British Overseas citizens have never been EU citizens and did not enjoy freedom of movement for worker in other EU countries. They were, and continue to be, exempted from obtaining visas when visiting the Schengen Area.

== See also ==
- French people living outside France
- Swiss abroad
