= UKPS =

The abbreviation UKPS may refer to:

- the United Kingdom Pound sterling (currency);
- the United Kingdom Passport Service, a former government agency;
- UK Public Sector Consulting, a private consultancy company
