= Right of abode in the United Kingdom =

British immigration status

A Certificate of Entitlement endorsed in the passports of those with the right of abode in the United Kingdom who do not possess or are ineligible for a British Citizen passport

The right of abode (ROA) is an immigration status in the United Kingdom that gives a person the unrestricted right to enter and live in the UK. It was introduced by the Immigration Act 1971 which went into effect on 1 January 1973. This status is held by British citizens, certain British subjects, as well as certain Commonwealth citizens with specific connections to the UK before 1983. Since 1983, it is not possible for a person to acquire this status without being a British citizen.

The right of abode is the most common immigration status in the UK due to its association with British citizenship. However, it should not be confused with the indefinite leave to remain (ILR), another form of long-term residency status in the UK which is more comparable to other countries' permanent residence status.

== Rights and privileges of the right of abode ==
All individuals who have the right of abode in the UK (regardless of whether they are a British citizen, British subject or Commonwealth citizen) enjoy the following rights and privileges:

- an unconditional right to enter, live, work and study in the United Kingdom
- an entitlement to use the UK/EEA/Switzerland immigration channel at United Kingdom ports of entry
- an entitlement to apply for United Kingdom social security and welfare benefits (although those with indefinite leave to enter may also apply)
- a right to vote and to stand for public office in the United Kingdom (since everyone with the right of abode is a Commonwealth citizen; these rights are conditional upon living in the United Kingdom).

Unlike indefinite leave to remain, a person's right of abode is normally valid for life and will not lapse regardless how long they stay outside the UK (or whether they have ever set foot in the UK) and cannot be revoked unless they lose their Commonwealth or British citizenship, or, for Commonwealth citizens, when the Home Secretary deemed it necessary for "the public good". In comparison, a person's ILR status will automatically lapse if they are absent from the UK for two or more consecutive years. If they wish to resume their residency, they may wish to consider applying for a Returning Resident Visa which will grant them indefinite leave to enter the UK if the application is approved.

In addition, those with the right of abode who are not yet British citizens may apply for British citizenship by naturalisation (or registration for British subjects or Commonwealth citizens with British-born mothers). Children born in the United Kingdom, British Crown Dependencies and British Overseas Territories to those with the right of abode in the UK will normally be British citizens by birth automatically.

== History of right of abode before 1983 ==
Prior to the enactment of British Nationality Act 1981, right of abode in the UK was mainly determined by a mix of one's connection with the UK and their nationality status.

The Immigration Act 1971 limited the right to enter and live in the United Kingdom to certain subsets of Citizens of the United Kingdom and Colonies with ties to the UK itself.

The following two categories of persons had right of abode:

Citizens of the United Kingdom and Colonies (CUKCs)

CUKCs who met any of the following requirements acquired right of abode between 1973 and 1983.

- born in a part of the British Islands (note that birth in the UK or the islands would automatically confer CUKC status in most circumstances);
- born to or legally adopted by a CUKC parent born in the British Islands;
- born to or legally adopted by a parent who, in turn, was born to or legally adopted by a CUKC parent born in the British Islands;
- had settled in the British Islands and remained for at least five years before 31 December 1982, providing that all entry conditions had been removed by the end of that period;
- was a female CUKC married to a CUKC man with right of abode.

Commonwealth citizens

Any Commonwealth citizens who met one of the requirements below would also acquire right of abode between 1973 and 1983.

- born to or legally adopted by a CUKC parent born in the British Islands (note that this provision primarily applied to persons born to UK-born CUKC mothers as women could not pass down CUKC status);
- was a female Commonwealth citizen married to a CUKC man who had right of abode. The person they were married to must not have a living ex-partner who had acquired right of abode in the UK at any given time. (This restriction does not apply if the applicant entered the UK at any time prior to 1 August 1988 and was the only wife of the husband who had been allowed to enter the UK.)

Right of abode was limited to CUKCs and Commonwealth citizens, therefore certain people with connections to the UK were not eligible even if they had a UK-born parent. For example, a person born to a UK-born CUKC mother and a non-Commonwealth citizen father in the United States would not acquire right of abode as they possessed neither CUKC status nor Commonwealth citizenship (CUKC status by descent could only be inherited from the father before 1983). However, the same person would obtain right of abode if born in Canada, due to Canada's membership in the Commonwealth, even when they would not be a CUKC or, since 1983, a British citizen.

=== "So had it" language ===
That wording of the measure introduced minor confusion into the concept of the right of abode, when it limited right of abode through descent to a CUKC who had a parent who had CUKC status by "birth, adoption, naturalisation or .... registration in the United Kingdom or in any of the islands" or a grandparent CUKC who "at the time of that birth or adoption so had it".

Whether "so had it" referred to a grandparent who had CUKC status generally or CUKC status from the UK and islands specifically was decided by courts to refer to the latter.

As the right of abode on 31 December 1982 was necessary to become a British citizen on 1 January 1983 under the British Nationality Act 1981, this meant that failing to meet the interpretation of the right of abode test above resulted in no British citizenship through that route.

The British Nationality Act 1981 modified the right of abode section of the Immigration Act 1971 to remove the wording at issue, although the former version still had effect for determinations of British citizenship through right of abode for persons born before 1983 and potentially their descendants.

=== Effect on British citizenship under British Nationality Act 1981 ===
CUKCs with right of abode would in 1983 become British citizens, whereas Commonwealth citizens' nationality status remained unchanged. However, any person who had voluntarily or involuntarily lost their CUKC status (or Commonwealth citizenship) between 1973 and 1983 would also lose their right of abode (which might be inadvertently caused by a colony's independence or a country's withdrawal from the Commonwealth). Consequently, this would also mean that they would have no legal status in the UK. This issue was highlighted in the 2018 Windrush scandal.

The introduction of the right of abode principle effectively created two tiers of CUKCs: those with right of abode and those without right of abode, both of which shared the same nationality status until 1983. The latter group would become either British Dependent Territories citizens or British Overseas citizens that year, depending on whether they had a connection with a British Dependent Territory.

== Acquisition of the right of abode ==
Since 1983, right of abode is established by the British Nationality Act 1981 and subsequent amendments, although the 1981 Act did not deprive any person's right of abode providing that they had retained the right on 31 December 1982.

Two categories of persons hold right of abode:

British citizens

All persons who became British citizens on or since 1 January 1983 have the right of abode in the British Islands.

Commonwealth citizens and British subjects who retained their right of abode prior to 1983

Right of abode is also retained by a Commonwealth citizen or a British subject who, on 31 December 1982:

- had a parent who, at the time of the person's birth or legal adoption, was a citizen of the United Kingdom and Colonies on account of having been born in the UK; or
- was a female Commonwealth citizen or British subject who was, or had been, married to a man who had the right of abode.

For this purpose, the UK includes the Republic of Ireland prior to 1 April 1922.

No person born in 1983 or later can have the right of abode unless he or she is a British citizen.

It is essential that the person concerned should have held Commonwealth citizenship or British subject status on 31 December 1982 and has not voluntarily or involuntarily ceased to be a Commonwealth citizen (even temporarily) after that date. For this reason, citizens of Pakistan and South Africa are generally not entitled to the right of abode in the UK as these countries were not Commonwealth members on 1 January 1983, unless they have citizenship in another Commonwealth country. However, citizens of Fiji (left the Commonwealth in 1987, rejoined in 1997) and Zimbabwe (left in 2003) are still continuously considered to be Commonwealth citizens for nationality purposes even after the two countries' withdrawal the Commonwealth because the UK has not amended Schedule 3 to the British Nationality Act 1981 to that effect. Since 1983, the only two countries that withdrew their Commonwealth membership and were subsequently removed from Schedule 3 are The Gambia (removed in 2013, re-added in 2018 but has no effect reviving the right of abode) and Maldives (removed in 2017), and, consequently, their citizens would have lost their right of abode on the day these countries were removed from Schedule 3 unless also holding British citizenship or citizenship of another country listed in Schedule 3 (which now includes South Africa and Pakistan).

A woman claiming the right of abode through marriage will cease to qualify if another living wife or widow of the same man:

- is (or has been at any time since her marriage) in the UK, unless she entered the UK illegally, as a visitor, or with temporary permission to stay; or
- has been given a certificate of entitlement to right of abode or permission to enter the country because of her marriage.

However, this restriction does not apply to a woman who:

- entered the UK as a wife before 1 August 1988, even if other wives of the same man are in the UK; or
- who has been in the UK at any time since her marriage, and at that time was that man's only wife to have entered the UK or to have been given permission to do so.

=== Multiple claims ===
An individual may be able to claim the right of abode in the United Kingdom through more than one route.

For example, a woman who was a New Zealand citizen and married to a CUKC with right of abode on 31 December 1982, and who subsequently moves to the UK with her husband and naturalises as British citizen can claim the right of abode in the UK both through her British citizenship and through her status as a Commonwealth citizen who was married to a CUKC with right of abode on 31 December 1982. Therefore, if she were to renounce her British citizenship, she would still hold right of abode as a Commonwealth citizen married to a CUKC. However, if she were to renounce her New Zealand citizenship, she would permanently lose her ability to claim a right of abode through her Commonwealth citizenship and marriage to a British citizen on 31 December 1982, and would only be able to claim a right of abode through her British citizenship.

== Proof of the right of abode ==
The only legally recognised documents proving an individual's right of abode in the UK are the following:

- a British passport describing the holder as a British citizen or as a British subject with the right of abode
- a certificate of entitlement to the right of abode in the UK, which has been issued by the UK government or on its behalf

=== Certificate of entitlement ===
An individual who has the right of abode in the UK but does not have or is ineligible for such a British passport can apply for a digital certificate of entitlement to accompany his/her other passport or travel document.

For example, a US citizen who has naturalised as a British citizen can apply for a certificate of entitlement to accompany his or her US passport to prove that he or she is free from immigration restrictions in the UK, rather than obtaining a British passport. A British Overseas Territories Citizen from the British Virgin Islands who is also a British citizen can apply for a certificate of entitlement to accompany his or her British Virgin Islands passport to prove that he or she is free from immigration restrictions in the UK, rather than obtaining a British citizen passport.

In contrast, a New Zealand citizen who has right of abode but is not a British citizen must hold a valid certificate of entitlement to accompany their New Zealand passport in order to be exempt from immigration control in the UK, otherwise they will be treated as subject to immigration control by UK Border Force officers at a port of entry.

A certificate of entitlement costs £589. This is considerably more expensive than obtaining a British passport (£102 for a 10-year adult passport, £66.50 for a 5-year child passport and free for a 10-year passport for those born on or before 2 September 1929 when issued inside the UK; £116.50 for a 10-year adult passport, £75.50 for a 5-year child passport and free for a 10-year passport for those born on or before 2 September 1929 when issued outside the UK). Conversely, whilst British passports expire after the durations stated above, a certificate of entitlement, once granted, does not expire and remains valid for as long as the individual retains their right of abode.

== Other United Kingdom immigration concessions ==
United Kingdom immigration laws allow settlement to other categories of persons; however, although similar in practice these do not constitute a formal right of abode and the full privileges of the right of abode are not necessarily available.

=== Irish citizens and the Common Travel Area ===
Before 1949, all Irish citizens were considered under British law to be British subjects. After Ireland declared itself a republic in that year, a consequent British law gave Irish citizens a similar status to Commonwealth citizens in the United Kingdom, despite them ceasing to be such. Unlike Commonwealth citizens, Irish citizens do not require leave to enter the United Kingdom and, if they move to the UK, are considered to have 'settled status' (a status that goes beyond indefinite leave to remain). They may be subject to deportation from the UK upon the same lines as other European Economic Area nationals. In February 2007 the British government announced that an especially lenient procedure would apply to the deportation of Irish citizens compared to the procedure for other European Economic Area nationals. As a result, Irish nationals are not routinely considered for deportation from the UK when they are released from prison.

=== EU, EEA, and Swiss nationals in the UK ===
In the Immigration (European Economic Area) Regulations 2006, the United Kingdom declared that most citizens of EEA member states and their family members should be treated as having only a conditional right to reside in the UK. This has implications should such a person wish to remain permanently in the United Kingdom after ceasing employment, claim social assistance, apply for naturalisation or acquire British citizenship for a UK-born child.

Those EU/EEA/Swiss nationals who would be treated as holding permanent residency in the UK include:

- certain persons who have retired from employment or self-employment in the UK and their family members
- those who have been granted permanent residence status (normally acquired after 5 years in the UK)
- Irish citizens (because of the Common Travel Area provisions)

These persons remain liable to deportation on public security grounds.

Following Brexit, all EEA citizens' right to reside in the UK, including their permanent residence, will cease, although the UK government announced in October 2018 that any EEA citizen who takes up residence on or before 31 December 2020, or already took up residence (including holders of permanent residence status), will be eligible to apply for either settlement or pre-settlement status from 30 March 2019 to 30 June 2021. EEA citizens wishing to take up residence in the UK after 2020 will not be given preferential immigration status. The status of Irish citizens in the UK, which pre-dates EC-related legislation, was unaffected and was confirmed by the insertion of section 3ZA into the Immigration Act 1971.

=== Indefinite leave to remain ===
Indefinite leave to remain is a form of UK permanent residence that can be held by all nationalities except for British or Irish citizens, but it does not confer a right of abode.

== British Overseas Territories ==
All British overseas territories operate their own immigration controls, which apply to British citizens as well as to those from other countries. These territories generally have local immigration laws regulating who has belonger status in that territory.

== See also ==
- British nationality law
- Common Travel Area
- Commonwealth citizen
- History of British nationality law
- Indefinite leave to remain
- Right of abode
