= Falkland Islands status =

Belonger status, similar to citizenship

Falkland Islands status is a legal status in the Falkland Islands (the Falklands form of belonger status) defined by section 22(5) of the Falkland Islands Constitution and the Falkland Islands Status Ordinance, 2007 and is considered to be the closest thing to citizenship that the Falkland Islands can grant. The Executive Council of the Falkland Islands considers applications for status four times a year in January, April, July and October and advises the Governor as to whether or not they may be granted. If the application is unsuccessful, the applicant has the right to appeal to the Supreme Court of the Falkland Islands.

According to the 2012 census, a majority of those with Falkland Islands status are British citizens, with 11% coming from 58 other countries (including 18 Argentine nationals).

== Eligibility ==
=== Before 1 January 2009 ===
Before the current Falkland Islands Constitution came into force on 1 January 2009, Falkland Islands Status was defined by the 1985 Constitution, under which a person was eligible for Falkland Islands Status if they were:

- (a) a citizen who was born in the Falkland Islands; or
- (b) a citizen who was born outside the Falkland Islands
  - (i) whose father or mother was born in the Falkland Islands; or
  - (ii) who is domiciled in the Falkland Islands and whose father or mother became, while resident in the Falkland Islands, a citizen by virtue of having been naturalised or registered as such or as a British subject or as a citizen of the United Kingdom and Colonies; or
- (c) a citizen by virtue of having been so naturalised or registered while resident in the Falkland Islands; or
- (d) a Commonwealth citizen who is domiciled in the Falkland Islands who either
  - (i) was ordinarily resident in the Falkland Islands for the seven years immediately preceding 1st September 1997; or
  - (ii) has been granted such status under the provisions of an Ordinance providing for the grant of that status to Commonwealth citizens who have been ordinarily resident in the Falkland Islands for a period of at least seven years and has not, in accordance with the provisions of that Ordinance, lost or been deprived of such status; or
- (e) the spouse, widow or widower of such a person as is referred to in any of the preceding paragraphs of this subsection, and, in the case of a spouse, is not living apart from her husband or his wife, as the case may be, under a decree of a competent court or a deed of separation; or
- (f) under the age of eighteen years and is the child, stepchild, or child adopted in a manner recognised by law, of such a person as is referred to in any of the preceding paragraphs of this subsection.

=== After 1 January 2009 ===
Under section 22(5) of the current Falkland Islands Constitution, a person is entitled to Falkland Islands status if they are:

- (a) a person who had Falkland Islands status before 1 January 2009—
  - (i) by virtue of section 17(5)(a), (b), (c), (d)(i) or (f) of the former Constitution; or
  - (ii) by virtue of section 17(5)(e) of the former Constitution—
    - (aa) as a spouse, and the person is not living apart from his wife or her husband under a decree of a competent court or a deed of separation; or
    - (bb) as a widow or widower, and the person has not remarried; or
- (b) a person who was born in the Falkland Islands, who was a citizen at birth and whose father or mother was permanently resident in the Falkland Islands at the time of the person's birth; or
- (c) a person who was born outside the Falkland Islands, who was a citizen at birth and whose father or mother was permanently resident in the Falkland Islands at the time of the person's birth; or
- (d) a citizen who was born in or outside the Falkland Islands whose father or mother at the time of the person's birth had Falkland Islands status and was permanently resident in the Falkland Islands; or
- (e) a citizen who was born outside the Falkland Islands whose father or mother was born in the Falkland Islands and had Falkland Islands status at the time of the person's birth; or
- (f) a person who has been granted Falkland Islands status under an Ordinance providing for the grant of that status to persons who have been ordinarily resident in the Falkland Islands for a period of at least seven years, or such period not exceeding seven years as the Ordinance may prescribe, and has not, in accordance with that Ordinance, lost or been deprived of such status.

== Status ceremonies ==
Since 2007, all new applicants for Falkland Islands Status, if their application is successful, must attend a status ceremony and make a pledge to the Falkland Islands, as follows:

I [name] pledge my loyalty to the Falkland Islands and will respect its rights and freedoms. I will uphold its democratic values. I will obey its laws and fulfil my duties and obligations under its Constitution.

Ceremonies, which are presided over by the Governor of the Falkland Islands, normally take place within one month of approval of an application. The first ceremony took place on 17 August 2007.
