= British Overseas Territories citizens in the United Kingdom =

British Overseas Territories Citizens in the United Kingdom is a term referring to individuals who have migrated to the United Kingdom from a British overseas territory; it could also include UK-born people descended of these individuals.

Despite being under the jurisdiction and sovereignty of the United Kingdom, British overseas territories are not part of the United Kingdom. British Overseas Territories citizenship differs from British citizenship and does not automatically grant right of abode in the United Kingdom (except for Gibraltarians). All British Overseas Territories citizens (apart from those solely connected with the Sovereign Base Areas of Cyprus) were granted British citizenship on 21 May 2002, and hence should have right of abode in the UK. They can only exercise this full right of abode if entering the UK on a British Citizen passport or with a BOTC passport endorsed with a certificate of right of abode. A BOTC citizen travelling to the UK on a BOTC passport without a certificate of the right of abode is subject to immigration control.

According to the 2001 UK Census 27,306 people born in the 14 British overseas territories were residing in either England, Scotland, Wales or Northern Ireland. The breakdown is as follows (the population columns do not count the same people, i.e. 9,000 people live in Montserrat whilst close to 8,000 Montserratian born people are residing in the UK, so before their migration the population of Montserrat would have been over 17,000):

Territory of birth	Population of territory (Most recent)	Population residing in the UK (exclusive from previous column, 2001)	Notes
Anguilla	12,800	498	Up to 4% of living people born in Anguilla now reside in the UK
Bermuda	64,482	2,986	Up to 4% of living people born in Bermuda now reside in the UK
British Antarctic Territory	200 (staff)	0	
British Indian Ocean Territory	3,200 (military and staff)	19	Up to 1% of living people born in the British Indian Ocean Territory now reside in the UK
British Virgin Islands	21,730	163	Up to 1% of living people born in the British Virgin Islands now reside in the UK
Cayman Islands	64,948	369	Up to 1% of living people born in the Cayman Islands now reside in the UK
Falkland Islands	2,967	1,044	Up to 26% of living people born in the Falkland Islands now reside in the UK
Gibraltar	27,776	11,830	Up to 30% of living people born in Gibraltar now reside in the UK, see: Gibraltarians in the United Kingdom (many came to the UK during World War II as refugees. Others stay there after attending a UK university.)
Montserrat	9,000	7,983	Up to 47% of living people born in Montserrat now reside in the UK, see: Montserratians in the United Kingdom (many sought refuge in the UK after the Soufrière Hills eruption)
Pitcairn Islands	67	3	Up to 4% of living people born in the Pitcairn Islands now reside in the UK
Saint Helena	6,563	2,355	Up to 26% of living people born in Saint Helena, Ascension and Tristan da Cunha now reside in the UK
South Georgia and the South Sandwich Islands	11-26 (staff)	0	
(United Kingdom) Sovereign Base Areas of Akrotiri and Dhekelia	15,000 (almost half British military and staff)	0	(Cyprus)
Turks and Caicos Islands	21,500	56	Up to 1% of living people born in the Turks and Caicos Islands now reside in the UK

== See also ==
- British overseas territories
- British Overseas Territories citizen
- Foreign-born population of the United Kingdom
- Immigration to the United Kingdom since 1922
