= British Overseas Territories Act 2002 =

Act of the Parliament of the United Kingdom

British Overseas Territories Act 2002 (Note: Section 8(1).)
- Act of Parliament
- Parliament of the United Kingdom
- Long title: An Act to make provision about the name “British overseas territories” and British citizenship so far as relating to the British overseas territories.
- Citation: 2002 c.8
- Introduced by: Jack Straw, Secretary of State for Foreign and Commonwealth Affairs
- Territorial extent: United Kingdom; Channel Islands; Isle of Man; British Overseas Territories; (Note: Section 8(4).)

Dates
- Royal assent: 26 February 2002
- Commencement: 26 February 2002 (except sections 3–5, schedule 1, section 6 and section 7 and schedule 2 so far as relating to the British Nationality (Falkland Islands) Act 1983; 21 May 2002 (rest of act) (Note: The British Overseas Territories Act 2002 (Commencement) Order 2002 (SI 2002/1252).); (Note: Section 8(2)–(3).)
Other legislation
Amends	Interpretation Act 1978; British Nationality Act 1981; British Nationality (Falkland Islands) Act 1983

Status: Current legislation

Text of statute as originally enacted

Revised text of statute as amended

The British Overseas Territories Act 2002 (c. 8) is an act of the Parliament of the United Kingdom which superseded parts of the British Nationality Act 1981. It makes legal provision for the renaming of the British Dependent Territories as British Overseas Territories, and the renaming of associated citizenship.

== Provisions ==
As a result of the act, all who were British Overseas Territories citizens (apart from those solely connected with the Cyprus Sovereign Base Areas) immediately prior to 21 May 2002 automatically became full British citizens on that date. Previously full British citizenship was either automatically accorded or granted without conditions on request only to people from Gibraltar and the Falkland Islands.

The law was enacted five years after the end of British sovereignty over Hong Kong, whose population had been vastly greater than all other British Dependent Territories put together. At the time the act was passed, there were approximately 200,000 spread across the different territories.

The qualifying territories for the purposes of the act include the British Indian Ocean Territory (BIOT) and the British Antarctic Territory. At the time, there was discussion as to whether either of these territories should be treated as qualifying territories for the purposes of the act, when neither has a permanent population and in the case of the British Antarctic Territory there are competing territorial claims that are held in abeyance.

Although it is not normally possible under either territory's immigration laws to acquire British Overseas Territories citizenship (BOTC) by naturalization in that territory, the former inhabitants of the BIOT still hold BOTC by virtue of their birth, or a parent's birth, in that territory.

Although it was possible for BOTCs to voluntarily acquire British citizenship under the previous provisions of British Nationality Act 1981 through section 4 registration by meeting UK residency and good character requirements prior to 2002, the enactment of the 2002 act means that every BOTC who was not already a British citizen on enactment day automatically acquired that status without satisfying residency and character requirements. This, effectively, means that BOTCs are in a unique position of simultaneously holding two forms of British nationality. The only exception to this are for those connected solely with the sovereign military bases in Cyprus, and those who acquired BOTC status voluntarily (i.e., through naturalization) after 21 May 2002.

This has allowed residents of British Overseas Territories to apply for and travel on a separate British passport describing them as a British citizen, to reside in the UK permanently without being subject to UK immigration control, to join the British armed forces and police forces, and to exercise rights under the Human Rights Act. Although not explicitly stated, the act also granted them EU citizenship through UK's membership in the European Union, which (until UK's withdrawal from the EU was finalized) meant that BOTCs with British citizen passports were afforded all rights accorded to EU citizens in any EU country.

South Georgia and the South Sandwich Islands was included in the scope of the act mainly due to its former association with the Falkland Islands. The 2002 act is similar in scope to the British Nationality (Falkland Islands) Act 1983 and repealed some of that act (without affecting the validity of any acquisition of British citizenship under that legislation).

Those naturalizing as British overseas territories citizens after 21 May 2002 may submit an application to be registered as British citizens under section 4A of the 1981 act, subject only to good character requirements. However, the application must be made voluntarily. Hence, it is still theoretically possible for a person to hold only BOTC status but not British citizenship after 2002, if they had never filed such an application or their application is refused by the UK government.

While BOTCs of all the Overseas Territories (except the Sovereign Base Areas) are now either British citizens or eligible to acquire British citizenship (and therefore gain right of abode in the UK by virtue of being a British citizen), British citizens visiting Overseas Territories are still subject to local immigration controls and are, in most cases, given limited leave to remain by the territory's immigration officers.

The act also renamed the legal term "British dependent territories" to "British overseas territories".

Following the Chagos Archipelago handover agreement, the British government is also due to introduce legislation to implement the agreement, including amending the British Nationality Act 1981 to reflect that the British Indian Ocean Territory is no longer an overseas territory following Parliament's ratification of the treaty.

== Qualifying territories ==
Location of the United Kingdom and the British Overseas Territories including the British Antarctic Territory and the Cyprus Sovereign Base Areas; the latter is not covered by the act.

In the following is a list of all the overseas territories in which qualify under the provisions of the act.

- Anguilla
- Bermuda
- British Antarctic Territory
- British Virgin Islands
- British Indian Ocean Territory
- Cayman Islands
- Falkland Islands
- Gibraltar
- Montserrat
- Pitcairn Islands
- Saint Helena, Ascension and Tristan da Cunha
  - Saint Helena
  - Ascension Island
  - Tristan da Cunha
- South Georgia and the South Sandwich Islands
- Turks and Caicos Islands

== Commencement ==
The act came into force on 21 May 2002.

== See also ==
- British Empire
- British nationality law
- History of British nationality law
- Belonger status
- British Overseas Territories citizen
