= Belonger status =

Legal status recognizing close ties to a specific territory

Belonger status is a legal classification normally associated with British Overseas Territories. It refers to people who have close ties to a specific territory, normally by birth or ancestry. The requirements for belonger status, and the rights that it confers, vary from territory to territory.

== Rights ==
The rights associated with belonger status normally include the right to vote, to hold elected office, to own real property without the necessity for a licence, to enter and reside in that territory without immigration restrictions, and to freely accept employment without the requirement of a work permit. In general, to be born with belonger status a person must be born in a territory to a parent who holds belonger status. Belonger status can sometimes be passed to a child born outside the territory, but this is purposely limited, to minimise the number of belongers who will not live in the territory. In most independent countries, these rights would be associated with citizenship or nationality. However, as the British Overseas Territories are not independent countries, they cannot confer citizenship. Instead, people with close ties to Britain's Overseas Territories all hold the same nationality: British Overseas Territories Citizen (BOTC). The status of BOTC is defined by the British Nationality Act 1981 and subsequent amendments.

BOTC, however, does not confer any right to live in any British Overseas Territory, including the territory from which it is derived. It is the possession of belonger status that provides the right. Acquisition of belonger status in a British Overseas Territory does not automatically confer BOTC, but most people holding such status are eligible for registration or naturalisation as a BOTC upon meeting the requirements of the 1981 Act. Similarly, it is possible to lose belonger status in a territory while retaining BOTC or British citizenship.

The British Overseas Territories Act 2002 also conferred British citizenship upon BOTCs (other than those solely connected with the Sovereign Base Areas of Cyprus), which provides for a right of abode in the United Kingdom. The conferral is in addition to their BOTC and was not reciprocal in nature, and British citizens did not receive any rights to reside in the Overseas Territories without permission. The act also changed the reference of British Dependent Territories to British Overseas Territories. It was enacted five years after the United Kingdom relinquished sovereignty over its most populous dependent territory, Hong Kong, to the People's Republic of China.

== In the British Overseas Territories ==
=== Anguilla ===
The Constitution of Anguilla defines Anguillian status in section 80. This section was introduced in 1990 and originally referred to "Belonger status". This was changed to "Anguillian status" in 2019, with the Anguillian Belonger Commission similarly being renamed the Anguillian Status Commission. Section 80 now reads as follows:

- (1) There shall be an Anguillan Status Commission (hereinafter referred to as "the Commission"), the composition and functions of which shall, subject to the provisions of this section, be prescribed by law.
- (2) For the purposes of this Constitution a person shall be regarded as an Anguillian if that person—
  - (a) is a person born or adopted in or outside Anguilla and who has at least one parent or grandparent who was born or adopted in Anguilla, where such parent or grandparent is regarded as being an Anguillian by virtue of this Constitution or is regarded as belonging to Anguilla by virtue of any previous Constitution;
  - (b) is regarded as belonging to Anguilla by virtue of this Constitution (as in force before the commencement of the Anguilla Constitution (Amendment) Order 2019) or of any previous Constitution;
  - (c) is a British overseas territories citizen having been born or adopted in Anguilla or having become such a citizen by virtue of registration or naturalisation while resident in Anguilla;
  - (d) is domiciled in Anguilla and whose father or mother by virtue of registration or naturalisation while resident in Anguilla became a British Dependent Territories citizen at the commencement of the British Nationality Act 1981(1) (or would have done so but for his or her death) or so became such a citizen after the commencement of that Act;
  - (e) has been granted Anguillian status by the Commission on the basis that that person—
    - (i) is a great-grandchild of a person born in Anguilla and who is regarded as being an Anguillian by virtue of this Constitution or is regarded as belonging to Anguilla by virtue of any previous Constitution, where the great-grandchild has resided in Anguilla for a continuous period of at least five years; or
    - (ii) has resided in Anguilla for a continuous period of at least 15 years; or
    - (iii) is born in Anguilla and is a child under the age of 18 years of a person referred to in subparagraph (ii); or
    - (iv) is born outside Anguilla and is a child under the age of 18 years of a person referred to in subparagraph (ii), where the child has resided in Anguilla for a continuous period of at least three years; or
    - (v) is born in Anguilla and does not qualify under any of the foregoing provisions of this subsection, but has resided in Anguilla for a continuous period of at least ten years; or
    - (vi)is married to an Anguillian and has been so married for at least five years.
- (3) The Commission may withdraw the status of Anguillian from any person referred to in subsection (2)(e)(ii), (2)(e)(iv) or (2)(e)(vi) if that person is convicted of an indictable offence by a court of Anguilla.
- (4) A withdrawal of Anguillian status under subsection (3) does not prejudice the status of an Anguillian who obtained such status by virtue of a relationship to the person whose status has been withdrawn.
- (5) Any reference in this section to a period of residence in Anguilla is to be construed as a reference to residing lawfully in Anguilla and not in breach of Anguilla's immigration laws and will be calculated in a manner determined by law.

=== Bermuda ===
The term "belonger" appears only in the Bermuda Constitution Order of 1968, "A person shall be deemed to belong to Bermuda..."

Belongers include those possessing Bermudian status; naturalised British Overseas Territories citizens; the wives of Bermudians or naturalised British Overseas Territories citizens; and the children under the age of eighteen of Bermudians, naturalised British Overseas Territories citizens, and their wives. Other laws typically only use the term Bermudian status, neglecting to deal with other Belongers. A couple of recent court decisions in 2016–2017 have held that references to Bermudians should also be read as including other Belongers in the context of immigration law, company ownership and land ownership.

Only Bermudian status-holders may vote in island elections. With limited exceptions, only Belongers and the spouses of Bermudians may own land, live or work on the island without a permit.

Also with limited exceptions, Belongers must hold at least 60% of the shares and be at least 60% of the directors of companies doing business in Bermuda. This requirement does not apply to international business companies (known locally as "exempted companies"), which may have an office in Bermuda but may only trade outside Bermuda.

Under the current law, those born in Bermuda to at least one Bermudian parent, and those who live on the island while a spouse of a Bermudian for 10 years, are eligible for Bermudian status. Potentially extending Bermudian status to others is perennially one of the most politically contentious issues on the island.

=== British Virgin Islands ===
In the British Virgin Islands there are two forms of status: Belongership and BVIslander status. The two forms of status overlap to some degree, although it is possible to be a Belonger without being a BVIslander. BVIslander status is the 'senior' form of status and that is only conferred on those who have at least one grandparent born in the territory. Belonger status can be acquired in several ways, but generally it is granted as an honour (very rare), by naturalisation or it can be acquired after a qualifying period (three years at the present time) after marriage to a BVIslander. All BVIslanders and Belongers can vote, but only BVIslanders can hold a British Virgin Islands passport. It is possible to have BOTC status and be a Belonger but not a BVIslander if the person with BOTC status comes from another British Overseas Territory and has married a BVIslander.

The definition of qualifications for Belonger status in the British Virgin Islands is contained in section 2(2) of the Constitution:

A person belongs to the Virgin Islands if that person

- (a) is born in the Virgin Islands and at the time of the birth his or her father or mother is or was
  - (i) a British overseas territories citizen (or a British Dependent Territories citizen) by virtue of birth, registration or naturalisation in the Virgin Islands or by virtue of descent from a father or mother who was born in the Virgin Islands; or
  - (ii) settled in the Virgin Islands; and for this purpose “settled” means ordinarily resident in the Virgin Islands without being subject under the law in force in the Virgin Islands to any restriction on the period for which he or she may remain, but does not include persons on contract with the Government of the Virgin Islands or any statutory body or Crown corporation;
- (b) is born in the Virgin Islands of a father or mother who belongs to the Virgin Islands by birth or descent or who, if deceased, would, if alive, so belong to the Virgin Islands;
- (c) is a child adopted in the Virgin Islands by a person who belongs to the Virgin Islands by birth or descent;
- (d) is born outside the Virgin Islands of a father or mother who is a British overseas territories citizen by virtue of birth in the Virgin Islands or descent from a father or mother who was born in the Virgin Islands or who belongs to the Virgin Islands by virtue of birth in the Virgin Islands or descent from a father or mother who was born in the Virgin Islands;
- (e) is a British overseas territories citizen by virtue of registration in the Virgin Islands;
- (f) is a person to whom a certificate has been granted under section 16 of the Immigration and Passport Act 1977 of the Virgin Islands (in this subsection referred to as "the Act", and references to the Act or to any section thereof include references to any enactment amending, replacing or re-enacting the same) and has not been revoked under section 17 of the Act; and (without prejudice to the right of any person to apply for the grant of such a certificate under the Act) a British overseas territories citizen by virtue of naturalisation in the Virgin Islands has a right by virtue of this Constitution to apply for the grant of such a certificate;
- (g) is the spouse of a person who belongs to the Virgin Islands and has been granted a certificate under section 16 of the Act; or
- (h) was immediately before the commencement of this Constitution deemed to belong to the Virgin Islands by virtue of the Virgin Islands (Constitution) Order 1976(3).

The British Virgin Islands is extremely restrictive about conferring Belongership status on immigrants to the Territory. Under the leadership of Orlando Smith the Government formally committed itself to naturalising no more than 25 persons a year. This was maintained when Smith's NDP party was no longer in office.

=== Cayman Islands ===
The Caymanian Status and Permanent Residency Board may, upon application, grant the right to be Caymanian to persons in the categories below.

- A child or grandchild of a Caymanian born in the Cayman Islands;
- A person who is a British Overseas Territories Citizen by reason of a certificate of naturalization or registration issued under the British Nationality Act 1981 by virtue of his connection with the Islands. Possession of a British Overseas Territory Citizen/Cayman Islands (BOTC/CI) Passport is not conclusive proof that the holder is Caymanian;
- A person who is married to a Caymanian;
- A person who is the surviving spouse of a Caymanian;
- A person who
  - has attained the age of seventeen;
  - has Caymanian Status which
    - will expire when they reach the age of eighteen; or
    - has expired as they have reached the age of eighteen; and
  - who has been legally and ordinarily resident in the Cayman Islands for at least five out of the seven years immediately preceding the date of their application for the continuation of the right to be Caymanian.

Persons who may apply to the Chief Immigration Officer for the right to be Caymanian

A person who

- was born in the Cayman Islands between 27 March 1977 and 1 January 1983;
- is a British Overseas Territories Citizen by virtue of being born in the Cayman Islands; and
- has resided in the Islands since birth save for absences abroad for purposes of education or medical treatment.

may apply no later than 21 December 2007 to the Chief Immigration Officer for the right to be Caymanian. The Chief Immigration Officer is required by law, save in exceptional circumstances, to grant such an application.

=== Falkland Islands ===
Belonger status in the Falkland Islands is officially referred to as "Falkland Islands status".

=== Gibraltar ===
As with Bermuda, the term itself has been supplanted by "Gibraltarian status".

To apply for Gibraltarian status under Section 5 of the Gibraltarian Status Act you must qualify under the following:

  - (1) There shall be entitled to be registered at any time any British national who:
    - (a) was born in Gibraltar on or before the 30th day of June 1925; or
    - (b) is the child of a person entitled to be registered under paragraph (a) of this subsection; or
    - (c) is the descendant of a person entitled to be registered under paragraph (a) or (b) of this subsection and whose parent or grandparent was born in Gibraltar; or
    - (d) is the spouse, widow or widower or surviving civil partner of a person entitled to be registered under paragraph (a), (b) or (c) of this subsection; or
    - (e) is the child of a person who has been registered by virtue of an order of the Minister under Part II; or
    - (f) is the descendant of a person who has been registered by virtue of an order made by the Minister under Part II and whose parent or grandparent was born in Gibraltar; or
    - (g) is the spouse, or civil partner, widow or widower of a person or surviving civil partner who has been registered by virtue of an order made by the Minister under Part II or who is entitled to be registered under paragraph (e) or (f) of this subsection; or
    - (h) is born in Gibraltar and is the child of a person who is registered in the register; or
    - (i) is the spouse, or civil partner, widow or widower or surviving civil partner of a person entitled to be registered under paragraph (h) of this subsection.

Section 8 of the Gibraltarian Status Act

To apply for Gibraltarian under Section 8(1) of the Gibraltarian Status Act a person must qualify under the following:

  - (1) The Minister may, in his absolute discretion, order the registrar to register any person who satisfies the Minister that:
    - (a) he is a British national, and
    - (b) he has been legally adopted by
      - (i) a married couple, one of whom is a Gibraltarian; or
      - (ii) an unmarried person who is not in a civil partnership; or
      - (iii) a couple in a civil partnership, one of whom is a Gibraltarian.

Section 9 of the Gibraltarian Status Act

To apply for Gibraltarian under Section 9 of the Gibraltarian Status Act a person must qualify under the following:

9. The Minister may, in his absolute discretion, order the registrar to register any person who satisfies the Minister that:
  - (a) he is a British Overseas Territories citizen by virtue of his connection with Gibraltar, or Gibraltar or Great Britain is his country of origin;
  - (b) he is a British national;
  - (c) he is of good character;
  - (d) he has sufficient knowledge of the English language;
  - (e) he has his permanent home in Gibraltar;
  - (f) he has been resident in Gibraltar for a continuous period of ten years immediately preceding the date of application; and
  - (g) he intends to make his permanent home in Gibraltar.

=== Montserrat ===
Constitution of Montserrat, section 107(2):

For the purposes of this Constitution, a person shall be regarded as a Montserratian if that person—

- (a) is a British overseas territories citizen who was born in Montserrat; or
- (b) is a British overseas territories citizen who was born outside Montserrat and
  - (i) who was lawfully adopted by a person who is regarded (or, if deceased, would if alive be regarded) as a Montserratian by virtue of this subsection; or
  - (ii) whose father or mother or any grandparent was born in Montserrat; or
  - (iii) whose father or mother or any grandparent became a citizen of the United Kingdom and Colonies, a British Dependent Territories citizen or a British overseas territories citizen by virtue of having been lawfully adopted by a person who is regarded (or, if deceased, would if alive be regarded) as a Montserratian by virtue of this subsection; or
  - (iv) who is ordinarily resident in Montserrat and whose father or mother or any grandparent by virtue of registration or naturalisation while resident in Montserrat became a citizen of the United Kingdom and Colonies, a British Dependent Territories citizen or a British overseas territories citizen; or
  - (v) who by virtue of registration or naturalisation while resident in Montserrat became a citizen of the United Kingdom and Colonies, a British Dependent Territories citizen or a British overseas territories citizen; or
- (c) was born in or outside Montserrat of a father or mother who was born in Montserrat and is regarded (or, if deceased, would if alive be regarded) as a Montserratian by virtue of this subsection; or
- (d) has been granted Montserratian status in accordance with any law; or
- (e) was immediately before the commencement of this Constitution deemed to belong to Montserrat by virtue of any law.

=== Pitcairn Islands ===
The equivalent to belonger status in the Pitcairn Islands is the 'right of abode', which is a status that is specifically protected by Article 22 of the Pitcairn Constitution, namely that a holder "cannot be arbitrarily deprived of this right". Persons with the 'right of abode' in Pitcairn can apply to the Governor for a 'certificate of entitlement' as evidence of this right. As with other BOTs, this can be obtained through birth, descent or through a form of naturalisation that is linked to permanent residence.

==== As of right (through birth or descent) ====
The Right of Abode Ordinance 2010 provides a number of ways through which a person acquires 'right of abode' status as of right.

If a child obtains British nationality at the time of birth, they also acquire 'right of abode' status as of right if:

- They are born in Pitcairn and their father or mother was permanently resident in Pitcairn at the time of birth. (s.2(1))
- They are born outside of Pitcairn and their father or mother was permanently resident in Pitcairn at the time of birth. (s.2(2))
- They are born to a father or mother who was born in Pitcairn and had the right of abode in Pitcairn at the time of birth. (s.2(3))

A child, stepchild or a legally adopted child of a person who has a 'right of abode in Pitcairn' will also have a 'right of abode' whilst they remain under the age of eighteen years (s.2(6)).

==== By grant ====
If the right of abode has not been obtained as of right, it can only be obtained under the Right of Abode Ordinance 2010 if that person has first has acquired a right of permanent residence (s.2(4)-(5)) under the Immigration Ordinance 2014.

Under the Immigration Ordinance, an application for permanent residence will be considered by the Governor after consultation with the Island Council (s.12(2)) when applications are received from:

- the spouse (whether legally married or not) or dependant child of a person lawfully residing on Pitcairn or admitted for settlement.
- persons wishing to join other members of their families (e.g. the children, parents or siblings of a person lawfully residing on Pitcairn or admitted for settlement).
- any other person who does not have family ties but "who wish to move to Pitcairn to live and who have relevant skills which would contribute to the welfare of the Pitcairn community".

A child that is born outside of Pitcairn to a person who is permanently resident in Pitcairn at the time of birth will also gain permanent residence if they move to Pitcairn before the age 5. (s.13).

If the right of permanent residence has thus been acquired, that person can then acquire 'right of abode' status under the Right of Abode Ordinance 2010 if:

- They become formally naturalised or registered as a British national through an application to the Governor's office (s.2(4)).
- They become eligible for naturalisation as a British overseas territories citizen in respect of Pitcairn (s.2(5)).

In both cases, British law indicates that this is normally becomes possible (with conditions) after five years' residence, or after three years' residence for the spouse of an existing British overseas territories citizen.

=== St Helena ===
St Helenian status can either be acquired by right or by grant (through application).

Grant of St Helenian status can be acquired through application if the applicant:

- is of good character
- intends, in the event of a certificate being granted to him, that his home or his principal home will be in St Helena
- was in St Helena at the beginning of period of five years ending with date of application
- meets the requirement in relation to time spent in St Helena
- was not in that period undergoing a sentence or in breach of any laws in relation to Immigration

Grant of St Helenian status can be acquired through application to an applicant who is the spouse/life partner of a person having St Helenian status, providing that the applicant:

- is of good character
- intends, in the event of a certificate being granted to him, that his home or his principal home will be in St Helena
- was in St Helena at the beginning of period of three years ending with date of application
- meets the requirement in relation to time spent in St Helena
- was not in that period undergoing a sentence or in breach of any laws in relation to Immigration

Dispensation from the requirements in relation to the number of days absent from St Helena.

The Governor in Council may grant dispensation from the requirements in relation to the number of days absent in St Helena if:

- the applicant for dispensation has substantial economic, social or historical connections with St Helena
- exceptional circumstances why strict compliance with the requirements should be dispensed with
- would be in the public interest to grant the dispensation

A person who is exempt from Entry Permit requirements is not necessarily exempt from permission to work requirements. Generally, dependants of St Helenians are exempt from permission to work requirements but dependants of migrants are not and must apply for permission to work under one of the work based categories.

=== Turks and Caicos Islands ===
There are two main ways through which a person acquires Turks and Caicos Islander Status.

==== As of right (through birth or descent) ====
There are three ways through which a person acquires TCI Status as of right.

- By virtue of being born inside the islands, at the time of birth the person's mother or father has Turks and Caicos Islander status.
- By virtue of being born outside the islands, at the time of birth the person's mother or father has Turks and Caicos Islander status and—
  - (a) at least one of the person's parent or grandparent was born in the islands, or
  - (b) at least one of the person's parent was settled in the islands.
- By virtue of being adopted in the islands, at the time of the person's adoption the adopted mother or father has Turks and Caicos Islander status and the person was less than eighteen years old at the time of adoption (if adopted after 2015).

==== By grant ====
In order to obtain Turks and Caicos Islander status by grant, it is necessary to complete the prescribed application form and submit it to the appropriate authority.

There are several routes through which a person may apply for Turks and Caicos Islander status.

- If a person is a British overseas territories citizen by virtue of a connection with the Islands or a British Citizen who either
  - (a) has held a permanent residence certificate for a period of at least five years; or
  - (b) has been legally resident in the Islands for a period of at least ten years; and
  - (c) is neither serving a sentence imposed by a court for an offence against the law in force in any country, nor has been adjudged or otherwise declared bankrupt under any law in force in any country and has not been discharged.
- This subsection applies to a person if—
  - (a) the person's spouse has Islander status otherwise than by virtue of marriage and
  - (b) the Governor is satisfied that the person—
    - (i) has lived together with the spouse for a period of ten years ending with the date of the application and
    - (ii) has been resident in the Islands for a period of two years ending with that date.
- This subsection applies to a person if he is a dependant child of a person who is accorded Islander status by virtue of the last subsection;
- This subsection applies to a person who—
  - (a) is born in the Islands to parents who at the time of his birth were legally resident in the Islands,
  - (b) has acquired British Overseas Territories Citizenship by virtue of section 15 (4) of the British Nationality Act 1981;
  - (c) has been legally resident in the Islands for a period of at least ten years;and
  - (d) has attained the age of eighteen years.
- This subsection applies if—
  - (a) the person is married to a person who has been granted Islander status by virtue of residency, and that person was endorsed on the Residence Permit as the spouse;
  - (b) the person is under the age of eighteen years, and, was endorsed on a Permanent Residence Certificate; or
  - (c) the person is the child of a person who is the spouse of an Islander, who has not been adopted by the spouse who is an Islander or who is not the biological child of the Islander, who was endorsed in that person's Residence Permit.

== Hong Kong ==
Belonger status of the former British colony of Hong Kong was changed to 'Hong Kong permanent resident status' on 1 January 1987. The name remained unchanged after the transfer of sovereignty over Hong Kong in 1997. Only permanent residents and residents who had been resident in Hong Kong for seven years, regardless of citizenship or nationality, had the right to vote, to contest in elections, to hold public offices, to freely accept employment without work permit requirement, to reside without immigration restrictions, and to the right of abode within the territory.

Since 1997, the right to stand for direct election to the Legislative Council has been restricted to those who are concurrently permanent residents of the territory and nationals of the People's Republic of China through the Special Administrative Region.
