= HM Passport Office =

Agency of the UK Home Office

His Majesty's Passport Office

Agency overview
- Formed: 1 April 2006
- Preceding agencies: UK Passport Service; UK Passport Agency
- Jurisdiction: United Kingdom
- Headquarters: 2 Marsham Street, London, SW1P 4DF
- Employees: 3,180 (2013)
- Minister responsible: Jo White MP, Parliamentary Under-Secretary of State for Migration and Citizenship
- Agency executive: Joanna Rowland, Director General
- Parent agency: Home Office
- Child agency: General Register Office for England and Wales
- Website: www.gov.uk/hmpo

His Majesty's Passport Office (HMPO) is a United Kingdom government agency. As a division of the Home Office (HO), it provides passports for British nationals worldwide. It was formed on 1 April 2006 as the Identity and Passport Service (IPS), but was renamed HM Passport Office on 13 May 2013.

The General Register Office for England and Wales, which produces life event certificates for births, deaths, marriages, and civil partnerships, became a subsidiary of HMPO on 1 April 2008.

HMPO's headquarters is co-located with the Home Office at 2 Marsham Street, and it has seven regional offices around the UK: in London, Glasgow, Belfast, Peterborough, Liverpool, Newport, and Durham, as well as an extensive nationwide interview office network (as first-time adult passport applicants may be required to attend an interview to verify their identity as a fraud prevention measure).

The department was known as Her Majesty's Passport Office, until Queen Elizabeth II's death on 8 September 2022 and the subsequent accession of Charles III; it has since been renamed to reflect the change of monarch.

== History ==
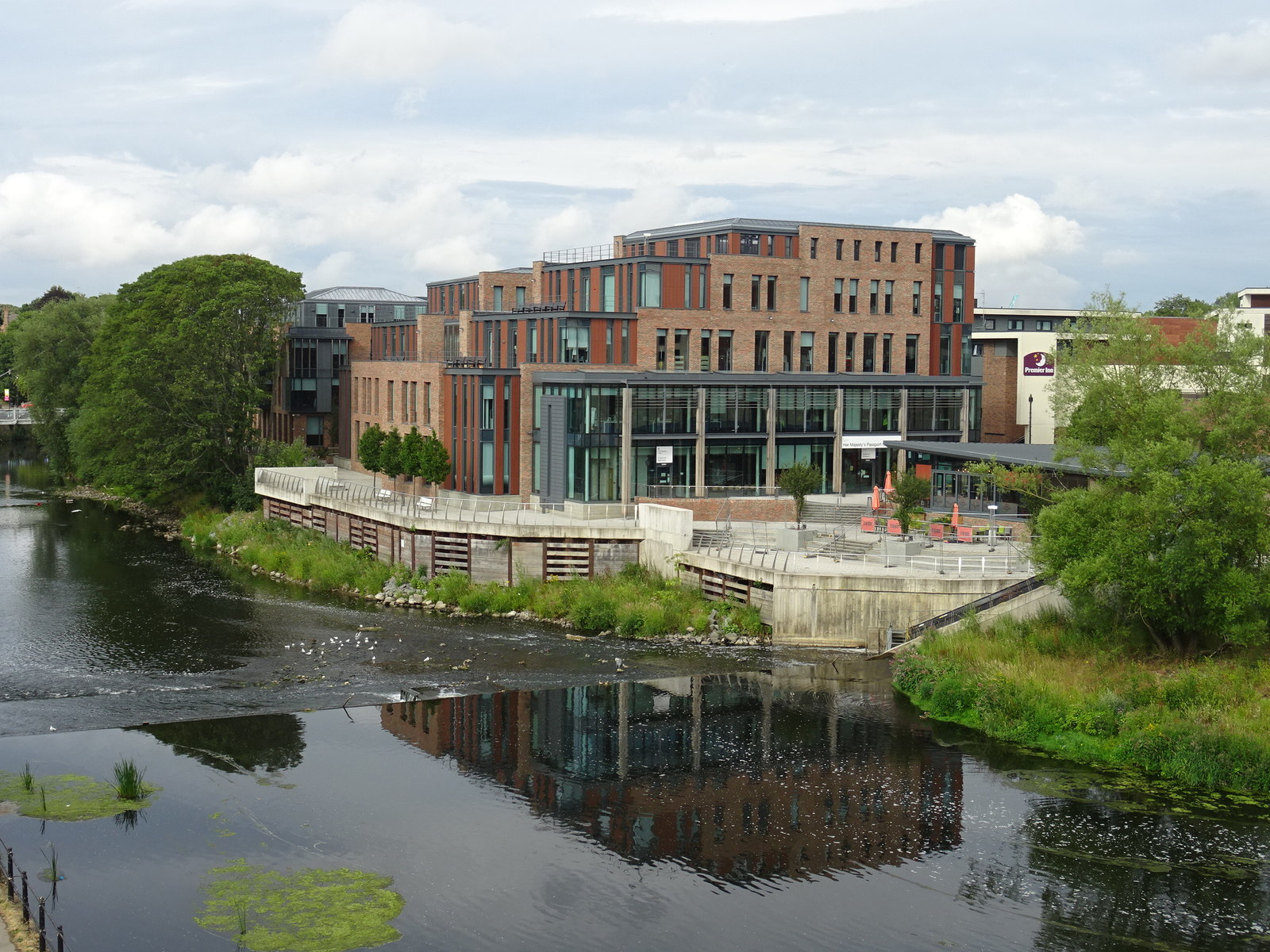
HM Passport Office's regional office in Durham

Until April 1984, the Passport Office had been part of the Foreign and Commonwealth Office. Following the Rayner reviews, the Passport Office was transferred to the Home Office. In 1991, the service became an executive agency as the United Kingdom Passport Agency (UKPA). The Identity and Passport Service was established on 1 April 2006, following the passing of the Identity Cards Act 2006, which merged the UK Passport Service with the Home Office's Identity Cards programme to form a new executive agency.

In 2007, the ninety British diplomatic missions that issued passports were consolidated into seven regional passport processing centres (RPPCs) based in Düsseldorf, Hong Kong, Madrid, Paris, Pretoria, and Washington, D.C. and Wellington, with an additional centre in Dublin. By March 2014 the issue of overseas passports was transferred from FCDO to HMPO and the seven international regional offices had been closed.

The Identity Documents Act 2010 repealed the Identity Cards Act 2006 and required the cancellation of all identity cards and the destruction of all data held.

On 1 April 2011, responsibility for British passports issued overseas passed from the Foreign and Commonwealth Office to IPS. The printing of passports issued overseas had been done in the UK since August 2011, and the administrative work performed at these RPPCs was repatriated to the UK during the 2013–14 financial year. From April 2014, all British nationals based overseas had to apply for their passports directly to the UK.

The Identity and Passport Service was renamed HM Passport Office on 13 May 2013, in an effort to distance the agency from association with the scrapped National Identity Register and ID cards. The government's press release stated that "The inclusion of 'Her Majesty's' in the title recognises that passports are the property of the Crown, bear the Royal Coat of Arms, and are issued under the Royal Prerogative." This means that the grant of a passport is a privilege, not a right, and may be withdrawn in some circumstances.

HMPO's executive agency status was removed on 1 October 2014, and it became a division within the Home Office. Its board reports directly to the Home Office's executive management board.

Teleperformance is contracted to provide customer service for the office. It is a £22.8m contract over five years.

== See also ==
- Five Nations Passport Group
