= British Overseas Territories citizen =

Type of British nationality

A British Overseas Territories citizen (BOTC), previously known as a British Dependent Territories citizen (BDTC), is a category of British nationality held by individuals connected with one or more of the populated British Overseas Territories (BOTs), which are the remaining non-sovereign territories of the British Empire. Notwithstanding this classification, inhabitants of the Falkland Islands and Gibraltar are considered full British citizens and are not solely recognised as BOTCs. This distinction was introduced to differentiate between individuals with a substantial connection to the United Kingdom and those whose links were confined exclusively to an overseas territory, excluding Gibraltar and the Falklands. Prior to 1 January 1983, all such persons were classified under the common status of Citizenship of the United Kingdom and Colonies (CUKC).

The enactment of the British Nationality Act 1981, effective from 1 January 1983, reclassified colonial CUKCs who lacked a qualifying connection with the United Kingdom as BDTCs, a status subsequently renamed BOTC in 2002. This revised status did not confer an automatic right of abode in any part of the United Kingdom or, in many cases, even in the territory with which the individual was affiliated. CUKCs born in the United Kingdom, Gibraltar, the Falkland Islands, or within the Crown Dependencies of the Channel Islands and the Isle of Man were reclassified as British citizens, and were entitled to right of abode in the United Kingdom.

The removal of this right from other colonial nationals had been progressively implemented through the Commonwealth Immigrants Act 1968 and the Immigration Act 1971. Although BOTCs remain British nationals and subjects of the British Crown, they are not British citizens unless they have acquired that status separately. Importantly, BOTC is not a nationality of a specific territory nor of the British Overseas Territories collectively. As the United Kingdom is a Commonwealth realm, all British nationals, including BDTCs and BOTCs, are also recognised as Commonwealth citizens. However, the privilege of free movement into the United Kingdom for Commonwealth citizens was curtailed under the Commonwealth Immigrants Act 1962. The BOTs themselves are not members of the Commonwealth in their own right, as membership is limited to sovereign nations.

BOTC status does not in itself grant right of abode in the United Kingdom. However, since 2002, most individuals holding this status have also been granted British citizenship, which includes such a right. Exceptions exist for persons connected solely with the territory of Akrotiri and Dhekelia, as well as for those who have obtained BOTC status through registration or naturalisation after that date. BOTCs who do not also possess British citizenship are subject to standard immigration controls when entering the United Kingdom. As of 2025, approximately 128,000 individuals held valid British passports designating them as British Overseas Territories citizens, and they are entitled to consular protection from British diplomatic missions when abroad.

== The territories ==
The British Overseas Territories are Anguilla, Bermuda, the British Antarctic Territory, the British Indian Ocean territory, the British Virgin Islands, the Cayman Islands, the Falkland Islands, Gibraltar, Montserrat, the Pitcairn Islands, Saint Helena, Ascension and Tristan da Cunha, South Georgia and the South Sandwich Islands, the sovereign base areas of Akrotiri and Dhekelia, and the Turks and Caicos Islands.

== Background ==
Before the British Nationality Act 1981, colonies of the British Empire were known as Crown colonies (although those with internal representative government were distinguished as self-governing colonies) of which there were a large number. Many of these became independent or parts of other countries before the new status was introduced. All natural-born British subjects previously held the unrestricted right of free movement in any part of the British Empire. (Originally the status of subject implied fealty or duties to the Crown without any inherent rights, but at the time of the Act's passing this term had already long been archaic as the Crown's subjects had steadily accrued citizenship rights with the formation of the Parliament of England, with its House of Commons and House of Lords.) By 1981, the status of British Subject had already become interchangeable in meaning with British citizen and British national.

As different areas of the empire were delegated legislative power from London, these territories gradually enacted their own laws governing entry and residence rights. However, these local laws did not affect British subjects' rights under UK domestic law, most particularly the right-of-abode in the United Kingdom of Great Britain and Northern Ireland, which were not subject to the locality the citizen was born or resided in, or the degree of local autonomy within that region. Several of the largest self-governing colonies achieved Dominion status (starting with Canadian Confederation in 1867), placing their governments on an equal footing to, but retaining links with, that of the United Kingdom. (The dominions collectively were the Commonwealth referred to in the phrase the British Empire and Commonwealth.)

Following the Second World War, all of the dominions and many colonies quickly chose complete political independence. Together with the United Kingdom (including its remaining colonies) all these territories formed a new Commonwealth of Nations (usually abbreviated to just "Commonwealth"). While each Commonwealth nation distinguished its own citizens, with the British Government's British Nationality Act 1948 categorising subjects from the United Kingdom and its remaining overseas territories as Citizens of the United Kingdom and Colonies (CUKCs), British subject was retained as an umbrella nationality encompassing all Commonwealth citizens, including CUKCs, so that those "belonging" to one territory would not be considered aliens in another. Although colonies that had not become independent Dominions remained under British sovereignty, they also had an accepted right to determine local immigration policy.

All CUKCs initially retained the right to enter and live in the UK. Immigration from the former colonies of the Commonwealth was restricted by the Commonwealth Immigrants Act 1962. Citizens of the new Commonwealth countries who had a qualifying link to the United Kingdom (who had been born in the United Kingdom, or who had a father or grandfather born in the United Kingdom) retained CUKC, becoming dual-nationals.

The Commonwealth Immigrants Act 1968 removed the rights of free entry, work, and abode in the United Kingdom from those British Subjects who were not born in, or possessed of a qualifying connection to, the United Kingdom. This applied not only CUKCs from Commonwealth countries, but also to those Citizens of the United Kingdom and Colonies in the remaining colonies.

The Immigration Act 1971 introduced the concept of patriality, by which only British subjects (i.e. CUKCs and Commonwealth citizens) with sufficiently strong links to the British Islands (e.g. being born in the islands or having a parent or a grandparent who was born there) had right of abode, meaning they were exempt from immigration control and had the right to enter, live and work in the islands. The act, therefore, had de facto created two types of CUKCs: those with right of abode in the UK, and those without right of abode in the UK (who might or might not have right of abode in a Crown colony or another country). Despite differences in immigration status being created, there was no de jure difference between the two in a nationality context, as the 1948 Act still specified one tier of citizenship throughout the UK and its colonies. This changed in 1983, when the 1948 Act was replaced by a multi-tier nationality system.

The current principal British nationality law in force, since 1 January 1983, is the British Nationality Act 1981, which established the system of multiple categories of British nationality. To date, six tiers were created: British citizens, British Overseas Territories citizens, British Overseas citizens, British Nationals (Overseas), British subjects, and British protected persons. Only British citizens and certain Commonwealth citizens have the automatic right of abode in the UK, with the latter holding residual rights they had prior to 1983.

=== Bermuda ===
The introduction of patriality for the colonial CUKCs in 1968 and 1971, and the change of their citizenships in 1983, removed the rights granted them irrevocably by royal charters at the founding of the colonies. Bermuda (fully The Somers Isles or Islands of Bermuda), by example, had been officially settled by the London Company (which had been in occupation of the archipelago since the 1609 wreck of the Sea Venture) in 1612 (with a Lieutenant-Governor and sixty settlers joining the three Sea Venture survivors left there in 1610), when it received its Third Royal Charter from King James I, amending the boundaries of the First Colony of Virginia far enough across the Atlantic to include Bermuda. The citizenship rights guaranteed to settlers by King James I in the original royal charter of the 10 April 1606, thereby applied to Bermudians:

Alsoe wee doe, for us, our heires and successors, declare by theise presentes that all and everie the parsons being our subjects which shall dwell and inhabit within everie or anie of the saide severall Colonies and plantacions and everie of theire children which shall happen to be borne within the limitts and precincts of the said severall Colonies and plantacions shall have and enjoy all liberties, franchises and immunites within anie of our other dominions to all intents and purposes as if they had been abiding and borne within this our realme of Englande or anie other of our saide dominions.

These rights were confirmed in the royal charter granted to the London Company's spin-off, the Company of the City of London for the Plantacion of The Somers Isles, in 1615 on Bermuda being separated from Virginia:

And wee doe for vs our heires and successors declare by these Pnts, that all and euery persons being our subjects which shall goe and inhabite wthin the said Somer Ilandes and every of their children and posterity which shall happen to bee borne within the limits thereof shall haue and enjoy all libertyes franchesies and immunities of free denizens and natural subjectes within any of our dominions to all intents and purposes, as if they had beene abiding and borne wthin this our Kingdome of England or in any other of our Dominions

In regards to former CUKCs of St. Helena, Lord Beaumont of Whitley stated in the House of Lords debate on the British Overseas Territories Bill on 10 July 2001:

Citizenship was granted irrevocably by Charles I. It was taken away, quite wrongly, by Parliament in surrender to the largely racist opposition to immigration at the time.

After passage of the British Nationality Act 1981, CUKCs were reclassified into different nationality groups based on their ancestry and birthplace: CUKCs with right of abode in the United Kingdom or who were closely connected with the UK, the Channel Islands, the Isle of Man, Gibraltar, or the Falkland Islands became British Citizens while those connected with any other remaining colony became British Dependent Territories Citizens (BDTCs). Conversely, CUKCs did not have automatic right of abode in the colonies. Right of abode in the territories is dependent on possession of belonger status, regardless of which type of British citizenship is possessed.

Aside from different categories of a citizenship, the 1981 Act also ceased to recognise Commonwealth citizens as British subjects.

The results of the Acts of 1968, 1971, and 1981 were the cause of much anger underlying these changes. Observing that Gibraltar and the Falkland Islands retained full British Citizenship caused particular anger. Bermuda, which had absorbed considerable immigration from the United Kingdom since the 1940s despite having its own immigration controls (of the 71,176 persons estimated to reside in Bermuda in 2018, 30% were not born in Bermuda, of which those born in the United Kingdom are the largest demographic group). As this immigration has been sustained for decades (the 1950 census showed 2,718 residents who had been born in the United Kingdom, out of a population of about 30,000), a substantial portion of the 70% who were born in Bermuda have parents or grandparents born in the United Kingdom.

The majority of Bermudians who retained right of abode in the United Kingdom after 1 January 1983 were, however, white (with whites making up a third of the population). Very few black Bermudians retained right of abode in the United Kingdom through a forebear born in the United Kingdom. Although after the 1 January 1983 any BDTC who legally resided in the United Kingdom for five years (generally with a student's visa or a work permit) was entitled to have leave to remain entered into his or her passport, this was an avenue that few black Bermudians could utilise, as not many could afford to study in the United Kingdom, and fewer still were able to obtain a work permit.

=== Debate over full citizenship rights ===
At the time of nationality reclassification in 1983, the largest group of BDTCs (2.5 million people) was associated with Hong Kong. The British government was unwilling to grant full citizenship and immigration rights to Hongkongers, fearing a mass migration to the UK after the transfer of sovereignty to China in 1997.

=== British Indian Ocean Territory ===
Following the Chagos Archipelago handover agreement, the British government is also due to introduce legislation to implement the agreement, including amending the British Nationality Act 1981 to reflect that the British Indian Ocean Territory is no longer an overseas territory following Parliament's ratification of the treaty.

=== Restoration of citizenship ===
Almost five years after Hong Kong was transferred to China, Parliament restored access to full British citizenship and right of abode in the United Kingdom to virtually all British Dependent Territories citizens. The sole exception to this was for those living in Akrotiri and Dhekelia, which were excluded due to their status as military bases as specified in the treaty establishing Cyprus. Any person who was a BDTC before 21 May 2002 automatically became a British citizen on that date, and children born after that date to BDTCs also automatically acquire full citizenship. Additionally, the Act renamed the status British Overseas Territories citizenship, mirroring the name change for the territories themselves as well.

== Acquisition and loss ==
British Overseas Territories citizens may originate from any of the 14 territories (shown in red).

There are four ways to acquire British Overseas Territories citizenship: by birth, adoption, descent, or naturalisation.

Individuals born in a territory automatically receive BOTC status if at least one parent is a BOTC or has belonger status. Children born to British citizen parents who are not settled in an overseas territory are not BOTCs at birth. Parents do not necessarily need to be connected with the same overseas territory to pass on BOTC status. Alternatively, a child born in an overseas territory may be registered as a BOTC if either parent becomes a BOTC or settles in any overseas territory subsequent to birth. A child who lives in the same territory until age 10 and is not absent for more than 90 days in each year is also entitled to registration as a BOTC. Furthermore, an adopted child automatically become a BOTC on the effective day of adoption if either parent is a BOTC or has belonger status. In all cases that an individual is a British Overseas Territories citizen at birth or adoption within the territories, that person is a BOTC otherwise than by descent.

Individuals born outside of the territories are BOTCs by descent if either parent is a BOTC otherwise than by descent. Unmarried BOTC fathers cannot automatically pass down their BOTC status, and it would be necessary for them to register children as BOTCs.

A child, now an adult, born abroad before 1 July 2006, (not in the UK or one of its Territories), to an unmarried BOTC born-father, is denied the right to claim his/her BOTC fathers' citizenship-by-descent. However, after a strong campaign by a group called 'British Overseas Territories Citizenship Campaign' led by US-based actor and advocate Trent Lamont Miller, a son of a British Montserrat-born father, the Home Secretary Priti Patel announced in a policy statement on 24 March 2021 that the UK Government's intends to remove this discrimination through additional legislation which will provide a retrospective right to register for nationality purposes. In that same announcement, Patel stated the Government also intends to remove discrimination against children born abroad before 1 January 1981 to BOTC mothers. Amendments will be made to the British Nationality Act 1981. In 2014, the same rights were made retrospective for children born to UK mainland British fathers. BOTC children of descent were intentionally left out. The new legislation will rectify this anomaly. Here are the key areas to be rectified:

1. Children born before 1 January 1983 to BOTC mothers Before 1 January 1983 women could not pass on British nationality to a child born outside the UK and Colonies. Provisions to allow for children born before 1983 to British citizen mothers to be registered as British citizens were introduced in the Nationality, Immigration, and Asylum Act 2002, but were not extended to BOTC mothers. This was because the registration provision was introduced to extend a concession announced in 1979 for the registration of children of UK-born mothers. The aim in 2002 was to cover those who could have been registered as children on the basis of that concession but had not applied in time. The criteria introduced - that the person would (if women could have passed on citizenship at that time) have become a citizen of the UK and Colonies and acquired a right of abode in the UK - aimed to cover those who had a maternal connection with the UK. The registration criteria were extended in legislation in 2009, but as this was introduced as an unexpected Lord's amendment there was no time to consult with BOT governments about the implications of doing something for BOTCs, which could have an impact on territory migration.

2. Children born before 1 July 2006 to BOTC fathers Similarly, children born to British unmarried fathers could not acquire British nationality through their father before 1 July 2006. Registration provisions were introduced for people born to unmarried British citizen fathers before 1 July 2006 to be registered as citizens by section 65 of the Immigration Act 2014. These provide for a person to register as a British citizen if they would have acquired that status automatically under the British Nationality Act 1981, had their father been married to their mother.

Section 65 was introduced at a very late stage in the Bill debates: it was recognised that each overseas territory has its own immigration law, and to create a route for people to become British overseas territories citizens (which could give a right of abode in a territory) would require wider consultation with governors and territory governments, which was not possible prior to the introduction of that Act. Corresponding provisions were not therefore included for British overseas territories citizenship.

3. British Overseas Territories Act 2002 The British Overseas Territories Act 2002 provided that anyone who was a BOTC on 21 May 2002 automatically became a British citizen. Equally, it allowed for British citizenship to be acquired through birth in an overseas territory or to a relevant parent from an overseas territory. This means that people in the above groups have missed out on both BOTC and British citizenship. The British Nationality Act 1981, therefore, needs to be amended to allow them to acquire the statuses they would have had if the law had not been discriminatory.

If a parent is a BOTC by descent, additional requirements apply to register children as BOTCs. Parents serving in Crown service who have children abroad are exempted from these circumstances, and their children would be BOTCs otherwise than by descent as if they had been born on their home territory.

Foreigners and non-BOTC British nationals may naturalise as British Overseas Territories citizens after residing in a territory for more than five years and possessing belonger status or permanent residency for more than one year. The residency requirement is reduced to three years if an applicant is married to a BOTC. All applicants for naturalisation and registration are normally considered by the governor of the relevant territory, but the Home Secretary retains discretionary authority to grant BOTC status. Since 2004, BOTC applicants aged 18 or older are required to take an oath of allegiance to the Sovereign and loyalty pledge to the relevant territory during their citizenship ceremonies.

British Overseas Territories citizenship can be relinquished by a declaration made to the governor of the connected territory, provided that a person already possesses or intends to acquire another nationality. BOTC status can be deprived if it was fraudulently acquired or if an individual is solely connected with a territory that becomes independent and that person gains the new country's citizenship. The last territory to have done so is Saint Kitts and Nevis in 1983. BDTCs connected with Hong Kong also had their status removed at the transfer of sovereignty in 1997, but were able to register for British National (Overseas) status before the handover.

== Rights and privileges ==
British Overseas Territories citizens are exempted from obtaining a visa or entry certificate when visiting the United Kingdom for less than six months. They are eligible to apply for two-year working holiday visas and do not face annual quotas or sponsorship requirements. When travelling in other countries, they may seek British consular protection. BOTCs are not considered foreign nationals when residing in the UK and are entitled to certain rights as Commonwealth citizens. These include exemption from registration with local police, voting eligibility in UK elections, and the ability to enlist in the British Armed Forces. British Overseas Territories citizens are also eligible to serve in non-reserved Civil Service posts, be granted British honours, and sit in the House of Lords if granted a life peerage. If given indefinite leave to remain (ILR), they are eligible to stand for election to the House of Commons and local government.

All British Overseas Territories citizens other than those solely connected with Akrotiri and Dhekelia became British citizens on 21 May 2002, and children born on qualified overseas territories to British citizens since that date are both BOTCs and British citizens otherwise than by descent. Prior to 2002, only BOTCs from Gibraltar and the Falkland Islands were given unrestricted access to citizenship. BOTCs naturalised after that date may also become British citizens by registration at the discretion of the Home Secretary. Becoming a British citizen has no effect on BOTC status; BOTCs may also simultaneously be British citizens.

== Restrictions ==
=== British Overseas Territories ===
Although British Overseas Territories citizenship is granted to individuals who are closely connected to particular territories, each territory maintains separate immigration policies and different requirements for conferring belonger status. BOTC status by itself does not grant its holders right of abode or the right to work in any of the territories and confers no entitlements other than the right to apply for a BOTC passport. Consequently, there are circumstances in which BOTCs do not have right of abode in the territory that they derive their citizenship from. BOTCs who are part of this group and have no other nationality are de facto stateless because they are deprived of the right to enter the country that claims them as nationals. Additionally, neither BOTCs nor full British citizens who are not belongers of a given territory may vote or stand for public office in that jurisdiction.

=== United Kingdom ===
British Overseas Territories citizens are subject to immigration controls and have neither the right of abode nor the right to work in the United Kingdom. BOTCs other than Gibraltarians are also required to pay a "health surcharge" to access National Health Service benefits when residing in the UK for longer than six months and do not qualify for most welfare programmes. However, since 2002, almost all BOTCs are also British citizens and have UK right of abode. When exercising that right and entering the UK for a period of more than six months, they must travel with British citizen passports or other valid passports endorsed with a certificate of entitlement for right of abode.

=== European Union ===
Before the United Kingdom withdrew from the European Union on 31 January 2020, full British citizens were European Union citizens. Most British Overseas Territories citizens were not EU citizens and did not enjoy freedom of movement in other EU countries. They were, and continue to be, exempted from obtaining visas when visiting the Schengen Area. Gibraltar was the sole exception to this; BOTCs connected to that territory were also EU citizens and did have freedom of movement within the EU.
