= British Islands =

Legal jurisdiction and term by law in the United Kingdom

- A map showing the areas referred to as the British Islands shaded red
- Interactive map of British Islands

Geography
- Location: North-western Europe
- Adjacent to: Atlantic Ocean, North Sea
- Total islands: 6,000+
- Highest elevation: 1,345 m (4413 ft)
- Highest point: Ben Nevis

Administration
- Bailiwick of Guernsey
- Capital and largest settlement: Saint Peter Port
- Area covered: 78 km^{2} (30 sq mi)
- Bailiwick of Jersey
- Capital and largest settlement: Saint Helier
- Area covered: 118 km^{2} (46 sq mi)
- Isle of Man
- Capital and largest settlement: Douglas
- Area covered: 572 km^{2} (221 sq mi)
- United Kingdom of Great Britain and Northern Ireland
- Capital and largest city: London
- Area covered: 244,111 km^{2} (94,252 sq mi)

Demographics
- Languages: Auregnais, Cornish, English, French, Guernésiais, Irish, Jèrriais, Manx, Scots, Scottish Gaelic, Sercquiais, Shelta, Ulster-Scots, Welsh

Additional information
- Time zone: Greenwich Mean Time / Western European Time (UTC)
  - Summer (DST): British Summer Time (UTC+1)
- Drives on the: left

The British Islands is a legal jurisdiction of the law of the United Kingdom which refers collectively to the following four polities:

- the United Kingdom of Great Britain and Northern Ireland (which includes England, Scotland, Wales and Northern Ireland);
- the Bailiwick of Guernsey (including the jurisdictions of Alderney, Guernsey and Sark);
- the Bailiwick of Jersey;
- the Isle of Man.

These polities constitute the principal geopolitical and territorial nucleus of British sovereignty. Distinguished from the British Overseas Territories, which are remnants of the former British Empire, the British Islands represent the core legal and constitutional realm under the direct jurisdiction of The Crown and Parliament of the United Kingdom (i.e. United Kingdom proper), albeit with varying degrees of self-governance among the Crown Dependencies. A statutory definition of the term British Islands can be found in Schedule 1 of the Interpretation Act 1978.

The Isle of Man and the Bailiwicks of Guernsey and Jersey are Crown Dependencies and not part of the United Kingdom. Nevertheless, the Parliament of the United Kingdom may, on occasion, introduce legislation that is extended to these islands, typically through Orders in Council. As such, it has been found useful to have a collective term to encompass the combined territories. The phrase The United Kingdom and the Islands is employed in the Immigration Act 1971 to refer to this collective grouping.

In addition, while several categories of British nationality exist, only British citizens enjoy the automatic right of abode in the British Islands. Other British nationals, such as British Overseas Territories citizens, British Nationals (Overseas) and others, do not possess this right unless they separately acquire British citizenship or are granted immigration status such as indefinite leave to remain (ILR).

== Statutory definition ==
Section 18 of the Interpretation Act 1889 provided that in future legislation, "unless the contrary intention appears":

"British Islands" means the United Kingdom, the Channel Islands and the Isle of Man.

The same definition appears in Schedule 1 of the Interpretation Act 1978 subject to paragraph 4(2) of Schedule 2, that definition in of Schedule 1 applies, so far as applicable, to Acts passed after the year 1889.

Paragraph 4(2) of the Interpretation Act 1978 provides that:

The definition of "British Islands", in its application to Acts passed after the establishment of the Irish Free State but before the commencement of this Act, includes the Republic of Ireland.

The Irish Free State was established on 6 December 1922 and the Interpretation Act 1978 came into force on 1 January 1979.

The Interpretation Act 1978 applies to itself and to any act passed after the commencement of that act and, to the extent specified in part I of schedule 2, to acts passed before the commencement of that act.

This definition of "British Islands" does not include the British Overseas Territories.

=== History ===
The expression "British Islands" was formerly defined by section 18(1) of the Interpretation Act 1889 as meaning the then United Kingdom of Great Britain and Ireland, the Channel Islands, and the Isle of Man. This definition applied to the Interpretation Act 1889 itself, and to every act passed after the commencement of that act on 1 January 1890.

Section 19 of the Lloyd's Signal Stations Act 1888 contained a definition of "British Islands". The Lloyd's Signal Stations Act 1888 was repealed by the Lloyd's Act 1982.

The Irish Free State left the United Kingdom on 6 December 1922 (although the latter's full name was not changed to "United Kingdom of Great Britain and Northern Ireland" until the Royal and Parliamentary Titles Act 1927). On 27 March 1923 an Order in Council was made changing the default statutory interpretation of various expressions, including "British Islands", "United Kingdom", and "Ireland"; they would be interpreted within the British Islands as excluding the Irish Free State, but interpreted elsewhere in the British Empire as including the Irish Free State.

==== Colonial statutes ====
Section 5(2) of the Interpretation Ordinance, 1891 of British Guiana contained a definition of "British Islands".

Section 2 of the Interpretation Ordinance (c 2) (1953) of British Honduras contained a definition of "British Islands".

Section 28(ii) of the Interpretation and Common Form Ordinance, 1903 of the Seychelles contained a definition of "British Islands".

== Law ==
Section 13(3) of the Foreign and Colonial Parcel Post Warrant 1897 (SR&O 1897/721) and section 6(2) of the Foreign and Colonial Post (Insured Boxes) Warrant 1908 (SR&O 1908/1313) refer to "the law of the British Islands".

== Inland ==
=== Inland postal packets ===
Section 62(16) of the Inland Post Warrant 1936 (SR&O 1936/618) defined the expression "Inland" in terms of the British Islands.

=== Inland bills ===
The definition of "inland bill" in section 4(1) of the Bills of Exchange Act 1882 refers to the British Islands.

== Defence ==
Section 26(1)(a) of the Freedom of Information Act 2000 states:

Information is exempt information if its disclosure under this Act would, or would be likely to, prejudice the defence of the British Islands.

== Fisheries ==
The exclusive fishery limits of the British Islands were defined by section 28 of the Sea Fisheries Act 1883. This definition was repealed by Schedule 2 to the Fishery Limits Act 1964.

The fishery limits of the British Islands were defined by section 1(1) of the Fishery Limits Act 1964. This provision was repealed by the Fishery Limits Act 1976.

== Extradition ==
Francis Taylor Piggott said the effect of section 37 of the Fugitive Offenders Act 1881 was to make of the British Islands one coherent whole for the purposes of that Act. That Act was repealed by Schedule 2 to the Fugitive Offenders Act 1967.

== Passports ==
The expression "British Islands" has been included on the covers of passports of the Isle of Man, passports of Guernsey and passports of Jersey.

== See also ==
- Names of the British Isles
- List of islands of the British Isles
- Terminology of the British Isles
