= External relations of the Isle of Man =

The Isle of Man is not part of the United Kingdom, but to a large extent its relations with other countries are handled by the United Kingdom.

== Legal status of the island ==
In various laws of the United Kingdom, "the United Kingdom" is defined to exclude the Isle of Man. Such laws include the Colonial Laws Validity Act 1865, the Interpretation Act 1889, the Royal and Parliamentary Titles Act 1927, the British Nationality Act 1948, the Interpretation Act 1978, the Isle of Man Act 1979, the Royal Assent to Legislation (Isle of Man) Order 1981 and the Statute Law Revision (Isle of Man) Act 1991.

The UK Ministry of Justice has stated in respect of the Isle of Man and the Channel Islands that:

The Crown Dependencies are not part of the United Kingdom but are self-governing dependencies of the Crown. This means they have their own directly elected legislative assemblies, administrative, fiscal and legal systems and courts of law. They are not represented in [the United Kingdom] [P]arliament. The constitutional relationship of the Islands with the United Kingdom is through the Crown and is not enshrined in a formal constitutional document. His Majesty's Government is responsible for the defence and international relations of the Islands. The Crown, acting through the Privy Council, is ultimately responsible for ensuring their good government. [...] The Lieutenant-Governor for each Crown Dependency is [the King's] personal representative. The Lord Chancellor and Secretary of State for Justice is the Privy Counsellor with special responsibility for Island Affairs and is supported by a Ministry of Justice Minister who is responsible for the conduct of Islands' business within Whitehall.

== International identity ==
Historically, the UK has taken care of its external and defence affairs, and retains paramount power to legislate for the Island. However, in 2007, the Isle of Man and the UK signed an agreement that established frameworks for the development of the international identity of the Isle of Man. Among the points clarified in the agreement were that:

- the UK has no democratic accountability in and for the Isle of Man, which is governed by its own democratically elected assembly;
- the UK will not act internationally on behalf of the Isle of Man without prior consultation;
- the Isle of Man has an international identity that is different from that of the UK;
- the UK supports the principle of the Isle of Man further developing its international identity;
- the UK recognises that the interests of the Isle of Man may differ from those of the UK, and the UK will seek to represent any differing interests when acting in an international capacity; and
- the UK and the Isle of Man will work together to resolve or clarify any differences that may arise between their respective interests.

== Citizenship ==
There is no separate Manx citizenship. Citizenship is covered by UK law, and Manx people are classed as British citizens. However, unlike British citizens from the UK, those defined as Manx people under Protocol 3 of the treaty of accession of the United Kingdom, by which the United Kingdom became a member of the European Economic Community, have an endorsement placed in their passports stating that they are not allowed to benefit from European Union provisions relating to employment or establishment. Those Manx persons with a parent or grandparent born in the United Kingdom (England, Scotland, Wales and Northern Ireland), or who have lived in the UK for five years, are deemed to have a sufficient relationship to the UK not to be subject to this provision.

== European Union ==
The Isle of Man holds neither membership nor associate membership of the European Union, and lies outside the European Economic Area (EEA). Nonetheless, Protocol 3 permits trade in Manx goods without non-EU tariffs. In conjunction with the Customs and Excise agreement with the UK, this facilitates free trade with the UK. While Manx goods can be freely moved within the EEA, people, capital and services cannot.

Like Jersey and Guernsey, the Isle of Man is not part of the United Kingdom and was not a direct member of the European Community, but its relationship with the EU was defined under Article 355(5)(c) of the Treaty on the Functioning of the European Union (former Article 299 of the EC Treaty) and Protocol 3.

The restriction on free movement of persons was anomalous in that the treaty establishing the EU clearly states that all citizens of member states will also be citizens of the EU. However a special protocol was inserted in the Treaty of Accession which excluded the Channel Islands and Isle of Man from the provisions governing free movement of people. This was done at the request of the governments of those Crown dependencies.

== Commonwealth of Nations ==
The Isle of Man is not itself a member of the Commonwealth of Nations, as membership is only open to sovereign nations, but it is considered part of the Commonwealth by virtue of its relationship with the United Kingdom, and takes part in several Commonwealth institutions, including the Commonwealth Parliamentary Association and the Commonwealth Games. The Government of the Isle of Man has made calls for a more integrated relationship with the Commonwealth, including more direct representation and enhanced participation in Commonwealth organisations and meetings, including Commonwealth Heads of Government Meetings. Allan Bell, a former Chief Minister of the Isle of Man, said: "A closer connection with the Commonwealth itself would be a welcome further development of the Island's international relationships."

== Relations with the United Kingdom ==
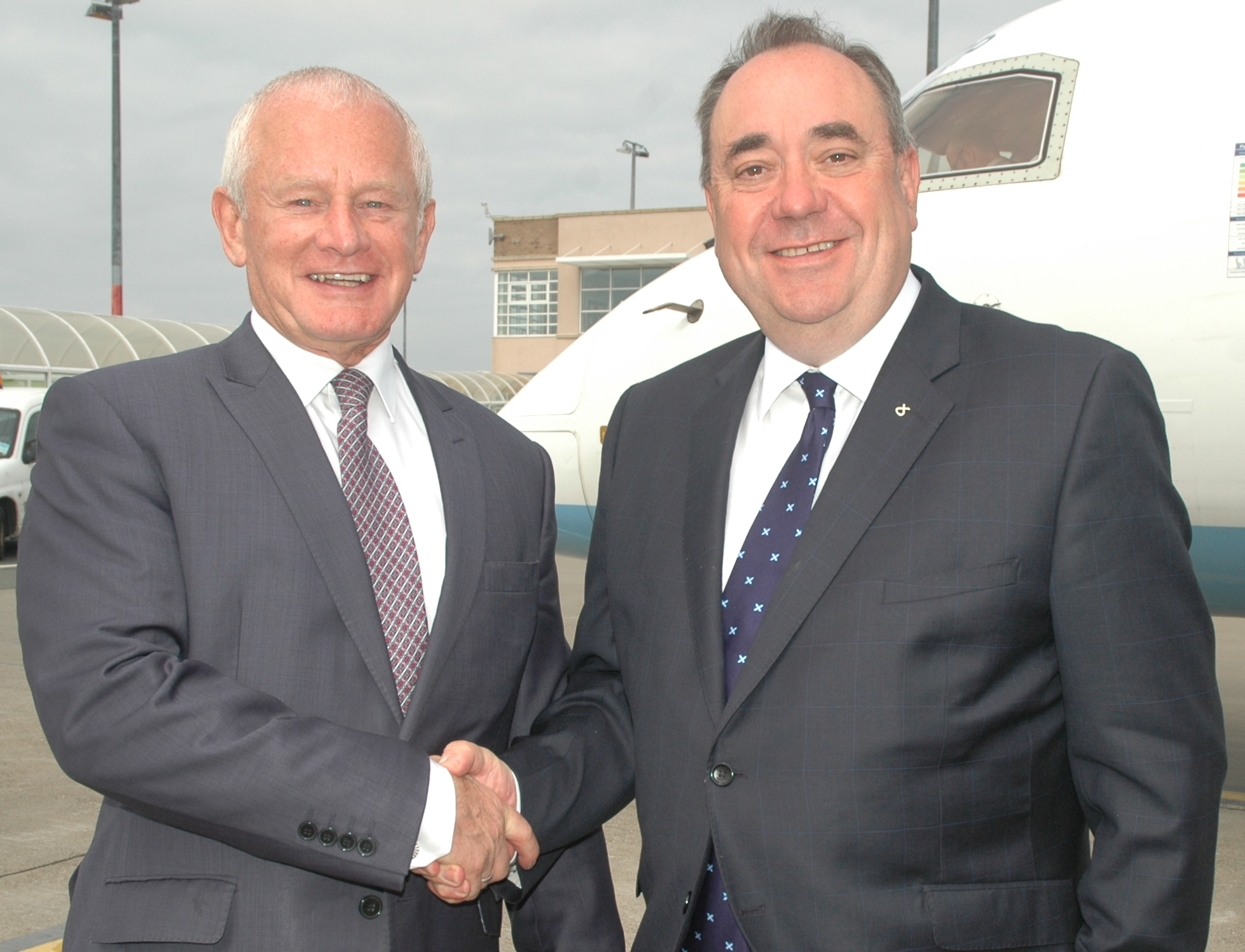
First Minister of Scotland Alex Salmond with Isle of Man's Chief Minister Allan Bell in 2013

The Parliament of the United Kingdom has paramount power to pass legislation for the Isle of Man on all matters, but as stated by the Isle of Man Government, "it is a long-standing convention that it does not do so on domestic matters without the Island's consent". The mechanism by which the Crown normally applies UK legislation is the Privy council.

There are at least two formal options for extending UK legislation to the Isle of Man:

- A "permissive extent clause" could be inserted. This might take the following form:

His Majesty may, by Order in Council, direct that any provision of this Act shall extend, with such exceptions, adaptations and modifications, if any, as may be specified in the Order, to the Isle of Man.

- Alternatively, the Act of Parliament can directly state that some or all of it extends to the Isle of Man:

This Act extends only to the Isle of Man

— The Statute Law Revision (Isle of Man) Act 1991 (An Act of Parliament)

Unlike the relationship the Parliament of the UK once had with the Dominion legislatures of the Irish Free State, Canada, Australia, New Zealand, Newfoundland and South Africa under the Statute of Westminster 1931, there is no law in the United Kingdom which requires the Westminster Parliament to seek formal consent from either Tynwald or the Isle of Man Government before passing legislation for the Isle of Man. Tynwald requested that the Kilbrandon Commission on the Constitution (1969–73) propose that the above convention be enshrined in "strict law", but this request was rejected – partly because the UK Parliament could not make such a law binding on its successors.

Occasionally, the UK Parliament acts against the wishes of Tynwald; the most recent example was the Marine Broadcasting Offences Act 1967, which banned pirate radio stations from operating in Manx waters. A Manx bill to accomplish this was overwhelmingly defeated at its second reading in the House of Keys, prompting Westminster to legislate directly.

This power of the UK Parliament is an ancient consequence of the Lord of Mann's feudality beneath the English Crown, and not a consequence of revestment. An early example of the English Parliament legislating for the Isle of Man was the Bishoprics of Chester and Man Act 1541.

Within the British Government, the Secretary of State for Justice has prime responsibility for overseeing Manx affairs. Manx affairs are handled by the Ministry of Justice. Before 2001 the Home Office had this responsibility.

The UK Government justifies this power to intervene in Manx affairs by pointing to the responsibility of the British Crown for the "good government" of Man. This was the subject of a written exchange on 3 May 2000 in the House of Lords. In response to a Written Question by Baroness Strange enquiring as to the meaning and scope of the Crown's responsibility for the good government of the Crown Dependencies, Lord Bach, for the Government, replied, "The Crown is ultimately responsible for the good government of the Crown Dependencies. This means that, in the circumstances of a grave breakdown or failure in the administration of justice or civil order, the residual prerogative power of the Crown could be used to intervene in the internal affairs of the Channel Islands and the Isle of Man. It is unhelpful to the relationship between Her Majesty's Government and the Islands to speculate about the hypothetical and highly unlikely circumstances in which such intervention might take place." If the UK Parliament was unable to impose legislation upon the Isle of Man it would have "responsibility without power".

In addition, the Kilbrandon Commission was firmly of the view that Parliament has power to legislate for the Islands without their consent on any matter in order to give effect to an international agreement which the UK may have made on behalf of the Crown Dependencies. The Kilbrandon Commission went on to make the point that, if Parliament can legislate for the Isle of Man at all, about which there was no doubt, then surely this power knows no bounds: if Parliament can legislate, it can legislate in whatever area it chooses; this is, after all, implicit in the notion of the sovereignty of Parliament.

The Isle of Man was subject to certain European Union laws, by virtue of a being a territory for which the UK has responsibility in international law. These laws were those for areas not covered by the Protocol 3 opt-out that the UK included for the Isle of Man in its accession treaty – the areas excluded being free movement of persons, services and capital and taxation and social policy harmonisation. Exactly how far EU law extended to the Crown Dependencies was however unclear (see Rui Alberto Pereira Roque v. Lieutenant Governor of Jersey, [1998] E.C.R. I-4607).

The United Kingdom has had several disputes with the European Court of Human Rights of the Council of Europe, in respect of the Isle of Man, because of Manx legislation on laws providing birching (corporal punishment) and criminalising sodomy as an offence.

=== Advice of ministers ===
The King, the Lord of Mann, usually acts on the advice of his UK ministers, not those of his Isle of Man Government. In practice, this means that many decisions relating to the island are taken by the Secretary of State for Justice (previously the Secretary of State for Constitutional Affairs, and before that, the Home Secretary).

This includes:

- the appointment of the Bishop of Sodor and Man
- the granting or refusal of royal assent to Acts of Tynwald
- the appointment of deemsters
- pardoning or commuting criminal sentences (the Royal Prerogative of Mercy), most notably the commuting of all death sentences passed on the Island after the UK abolished the capital punishment in 1965 (see Capital punishment in the Isle of Man)

Before 2010 the Lieutenant Governor was appointed by the Crown under the advice of the Secretary of State, acting on the recommendation made by a panel led by the Government of the United Kingdom. Since 2010 the Lieutenant Governor remains appointed by the Crown under the advice of the Secretary of State, but now the advice as to the appointment is given under the recommendation made by an entirely local panel, comprising the Chief Minister, the President of Tynwald and the First Deemster.

== Ireland–Isle of Man relations ==
There is a long history of relations and cultural exchange between the Isle of Man and Ireland. The Isle of Man's historic Manx Gaelic language (and its modern revived variant) are closely related to both Scottish Gaelic and the Irish language, and in 1947, Irish Taoiseach Éamon de Valera spearheaded efforts to save the dying Manx language. Additional joint work on language preservation started as recently as 2008.

In 2008, Ireland signed several tax agreements with the Isle of Man: the first such agreements made by the Irish government with any international financial centre.

Ireland and the Isle of Man have collaborated on preparing reports and jointly pressing the UK government to shut down the Sellafield nuclear plant.

== Work permits and immigration ==
Anybody who has not lived on the island for five years, including British citizens, requires a Control of Employment work permit from the Manx government to take up employment on the island. Manx people, as British Citizens, may travel and work freely in the United Kingdom. Passports issued on the Island are marked 'British Islands – Isle of Man', instead of 'United Kingdom of Great Britain and Northern Ireland', and these passports are issued to all British Citizens resident on the island.

Protocol 3 of the Treaty of Accession of the United Kingdom to the European Economic Community stipulates that those defined as Manxmen "shall not benefit from provisions relating to the free movement of persons and services". Such people have a stamp in their passports stating that "the holder is not entitled to benefit from EC provisions relating to employment or establishment". Manxmen, like Channel Islanders, are not technically covered by the rights of the freedom of movement of workers and, therefore, have no automatic right to work or start a business within mainland Europe. This has caused a problem for several British citizens who, without their knowledge, have been designated as Manxmen, but started employment in Europe. They were later arrested at their place of work by immigration officers and removed from the premises after a few weeks when their details had been processed. A problem is that the stamp is not on the main details page of the passport; it is hidden on the reverse, and the words "European Union" appear on the front of the passport.

Travel to the Isle of Man is regulated by British law. Most travel to the island is from air and sea ports in either the UK or Ireland. Schedule 4 of the Immigration Act 1971 applies a reciprocal arrangement whereby foreign nationals legitimately present in the UK or a Crown dependency do not require any leave to travel to any other part of the British Islands.

The Isle of Man, together with the Channel Islands, the UK, and the Republic of Ireland, form a Common Travel Area, which means there are no immigration controls imposed on those travelling inside the area. However, because the Immigration Act 1971 does not apply to the Republic of Ireland, the Isle of Man uses the Control of Entry Through the Republic of Ireland Order to automatically grant legal leave to anyone arriving on the Island from the Republic.

Section 7(1) of the Immigration Act 1988 grants the legal right to visit and reside in the Isle of Man to EU and EEA citizens. The Isle of Man was not permitted by EU law to discriminate between the citizens of the UK and those of other EU countries, and consequently any British or other European citizen is currently free to migrate to the Island and live there. But a work permit is still required before taking up employment.

=== Asylum ===
The Isle of Man has no legislation related to asylum claims. Where claims are made, due to "safe third country" rules in international law, the claimant is returned to either the Republic of Ireland or the UK depending on their route to the Isle of Man.

== See also ==
United Kingdom–Crown Dependencies Customs Union
