= Passport =

Travel document for international travel

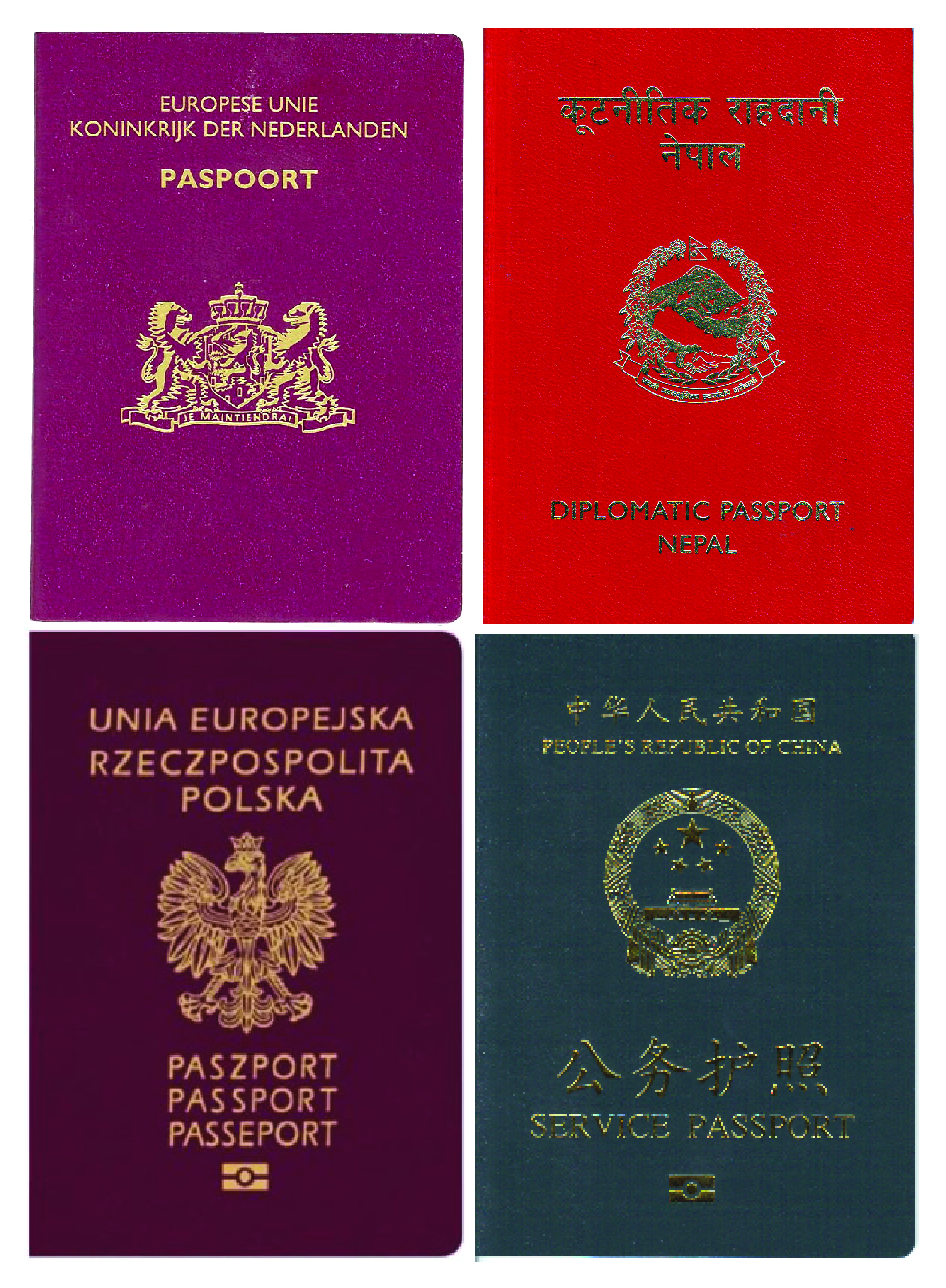
Clockwise, from top left: Dutch ordinary, Nepalese diplomatic, Chinese service, and Polish ordinary passports

A passport is a formal travel document issued by a government that certifies a person's identity and nationality for international travel. A passport allows its bearer to enter and temporarily reside in a foreign country, access local aid and protection, and obtain consular assistance from their government. In addition to facilitating travel, passports are a key mechanism for border security and regulating migration; they may also serve as identity documents for various domestic purposes.

State-issued travel documents have existed in some form since antiquity; the modern passport was universally adopted and standardised in 1920. The passport takes the form of a booklet bearing the name and emblem of the issuing government and containing the biographical information of the individual, including their full name, photograph, place and date of birth, and signature. A passport does not create any rights in the country being visited nor impose any obligation on the issuing country; rather, it provides certification to foreign government officials of the holder's identity and right to travel, with pages available for inserting entry and exit stamps and travel visas—endorsements that allow the individual to enter and temporarily reside in a country for a period of time and under certain conditions.

Since 1998, many countries have transitioned to biometric passports, which contain an embedded microchip to facilitate authentication and safeguard against counterfeiting. As of July 2024, over 150 jurisdictions issue such "e-passports"; previously issued non-biometric passports usually remain valid until expiration.

Eligibility for a passport varies by jurisdiction, although citizenship is a common prerequisite. However, a passport may be issued to individuals who do not have the status or full rights of citizenship, such as American or British nationals. Likewise, certain classes of individuals, such as diplomats and government officials, may be issued special passports that provide certain rights and privileges, such as immunity from arrest or prosecution.

While passports are typically issued by national governments, certain subnational entities are authorised to issue passports to citizens residing within their borders. (Note: The local governments of most inhabited British Overseas Territories issue passports to British Overseas Territories citizens resident holding belonger status in the territory concerned, while the Chinese Special Administrative Regions of Hong Kong and Macau issue passports to Chinese citizens holding permanent residence in the region concerned. Additionally, the British territories of Gibraltar, Jersey, Guernsey, and the Isle of Man are permitted to issue passports identifying their bearers as full British citizens.) Additionally, other types of travel documents may serve a similar role to passports but are subject to different eligibility requirements, purposes, or restrictions.

== History ==
=== Etymology and origin ===
Etymological sources, such as the Chambers Dictionary, show that the term "passport" may derive from a document required by some medieval Italian states in order for an individual to pass through the physical harbor (Italian passa porto, "to pass the harbor") or gate (Italian passa porte, "to pass the gates") of a walled city or jurisdiction. Such documents were issued by local authorities to foreign travellers—as opposed to local citizens, as is the modern practice—and generally contained a list of towns and cities the document holder was permitted to enter or pass through. On the whole, documents were not required for travel to seaports, which were considered open trading points, but documents were required to pass harbor controls and travel inland from seaports. The transition from private to state control over movement was an essential aspect of the transition from feudalism to capitalism. Communal obligations to provide poor relief were an important source of the desire for controls on movement.^{:10}

=== Antecedents ===
One of the earliest known references to paperwork that served an analogous role to a passport is found in the Hebrew Bible. Nehemiah 2:7–9, dating from approximately 450 BC, states that Nehemiah, an official serving King Artaxerxes I of Persia, asked permission to travel to Judea; the king granted leave and gave him a letter "to the governors beyond the river" requesting safe passage for him as he traveled through their lands.

The ancient Indian political text Arthashastra (third century BCE) mentions passes issued at the rate of one masha per pass to enter and exit the country, and describes the duties of the Mudrādhyakṣa (lit. 'Superintendent of Seals') who must issue sealed passes before a person could enter or leave the countryside.

Passports were an important part of the Chinese bureaucracy as early as the Western Han (202 BC – 9 AD), if not in the Qin dynasty. They required such details as age, height, and bodily features. These passports (傳; zhuan) determined a person's ability to move throughout imperial counties and through points of control. Even children needed passports, but those of one year or less who were in their mother's care may not have needed them.

In the medieval Islamic Caliphate, a form of passport was the bara'a, a receipt for taxes paid. Only people who paid their zakah (for Muslims) or jizya (for dhimmis) taxes were permitted to travel to different regions of the Caliphate; thus, the bara'a receipt was a "basic passport".

In the 12th century, the Republic of Genoa issued a document called Bulletta, which was issued to the nationals of the Republic who were traveling to the ports of the emporiums and the ports of the Genoese colonies overseas, as well as to foreigners who entered them.

King Henry V of England is credited with having invented what some consider the first British passport in the modern sense, as a means of helping his subjects prove who they were in foreign lands. The earliest reference to these documents is found in a 1414 Act of Parliament. In 1540, granting travel documents in England became a role of the Privy Council of England, and it was around this time that the term "passport" was used. In 1794, issuing British passports became the job of the Office of the Secretary of State. In the Holy Roman Empire, the 1548 Imperial Diet of Augsburg required the public to hold imperial documents for travel, at the risk of permanent exile.

In 1791, Louis XVI masqueraded as a valet during his Flight to Varennes as passports for the nobility typically included a number of persons listed by their function but without further description.^{:31–32}

A Pass-Card Treaty of October 18, 1850 among German states standardized information including issuing state, name, status, residence, and description of bearer. Tramping journeymen and jobseekers of all kinds were not to receive pass-cards.^{:92–93}

Before World War I, in most situations only adult males could receive a passport; their family members were written in their passport if they traveled with them. Even if a married woman had her own passport, she could not use it without her husband present.^{:93–94}

=== Modern development ===
A rapid expansion of railway infrastructure and wealth in Europe beginning in the mid-nineteenth century led to large increases in the volume of international travel and a consequent unique dilution of the passport system for approximately thirty years prior to World War I. The speed of trains, as well as the number of passengers that crossed multiple borders, made enforcement of passport laws difficult. The general reaction was the relaxation of passport requirements. In the later part of the nineteenth century and up to World War I, passports were not required, on the whole, for travel within Europe, and crossing a border was a relatively straightforward procedure. Consequently, comparatively few people held passports.

During World War I, European governments introduced border passport requirements for security reasons, and to control the emigration of people with useful skills. These controls remained in place after the war, becoming a standard, though controversial, procedure. British tourists of the 1920s complained, especially about attached photographs and physical descriptions, which they considered led to a "nasty dehumanisation". The British Nationality and Status of Aliens Act was passed in 1914, clearly defining the notions of citizenship and creating a booklet form of the passport. It also made a photograph in a passport mandatory.^{:93}

In 1920, the League of Nations held a conference on passports, the Paris Conference on Passports & Customs Formalities and Through Tickets. Passport guidelines and a general booklet design resulted from the conference, which was followed up by conferences in 1926 and 1927. The League of Nations issued Nansen passports to stateless refugees from 1922 to 1938.

While the United Nations held a travel conference in 1963, no passport guidelines resulted from it. Passport standardization came about in 1980, under the auspices of the ICAO (International Civil Aviation Organization). ICAO standards include those for machine-readable passports. Such passports have an area where some of the information otherwise written in textual form is written as strings of alphanumeric characters, printed in a manner suitable for optical character recognition. This enables border controllers and other law enforcement agents to process these passports more quickly, without having to input the information manually into a computer. ICAO publishes Doc 9303 Machine Readable Travel Documents, the technical standard for machine-readable passports. A more recent standard is for biometric passports. These contain biometrics to authenticate the identity of travellers. The passport's critical information is stored on a small RFID computer chip, much like information stored on smartcards. Like some smartcards, the passport booklet design calls for an embedded contactless chip that is able to hold digital signature data to ensure the integrity of the passport and the biometric data.

Historically, legal authority to issue passports is founded on the exercise of each country's executive discretion. Certain legal tenets follow, namely: first, passports are issued in the name of the state; second, no person has a legal right to be issued a passport; third, each country's government, in exercising its executive discretion, has complete and unfettered discretion to refuse to issue or to revoke a passport; and fourth, that the latter discretion is not subject to judicial review. However, legal scholars including A.J. Arkelian have argued that evolutions in both the constitutional law of democratic countries and the international law applicable to all countries now render those historical tenets both obsolete and unlawful.

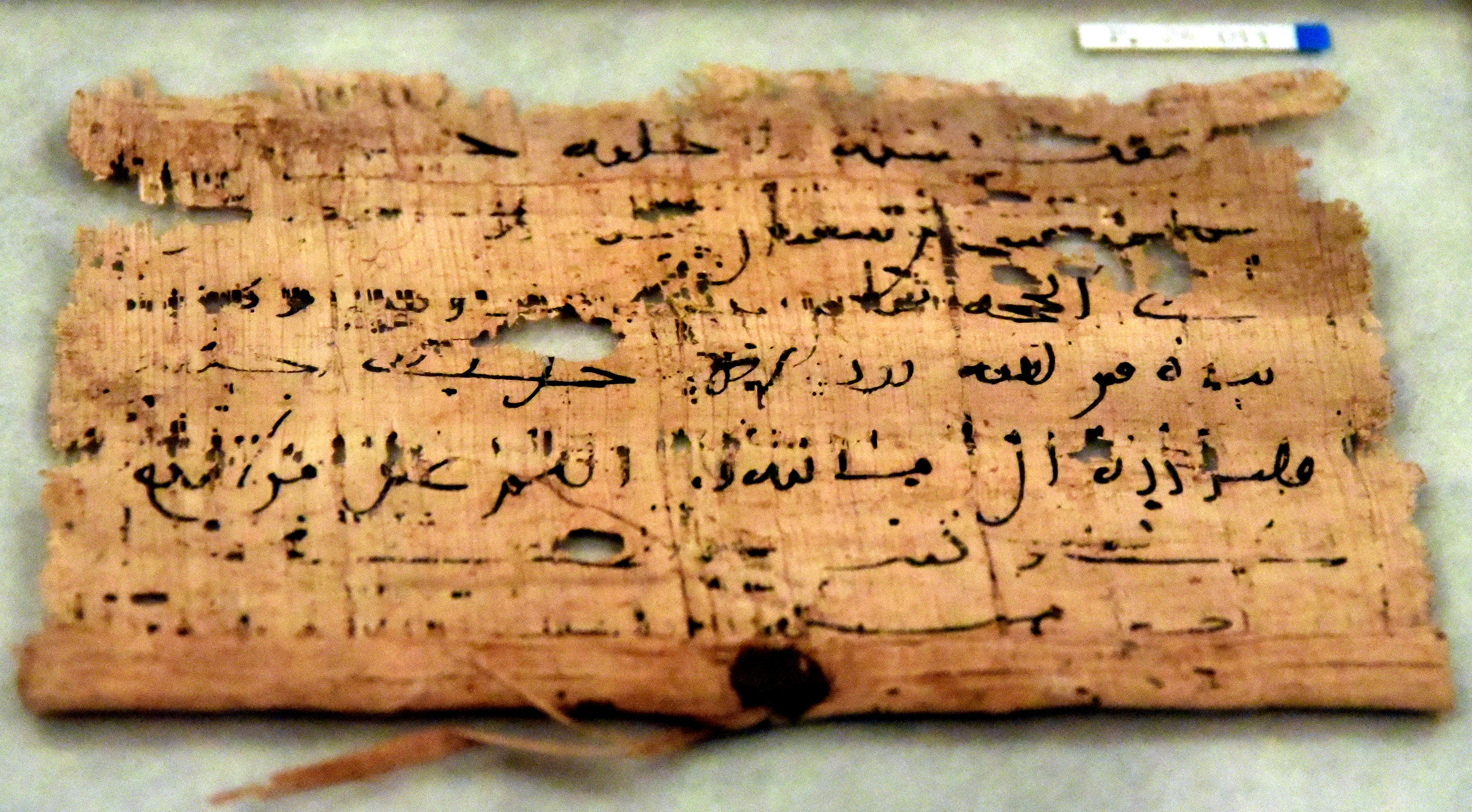
Arabic papyrus with an exit permit, dated January 24, 722 AD, pointing to the regulation of travel activities. From Hermopolis Magna, Egypt

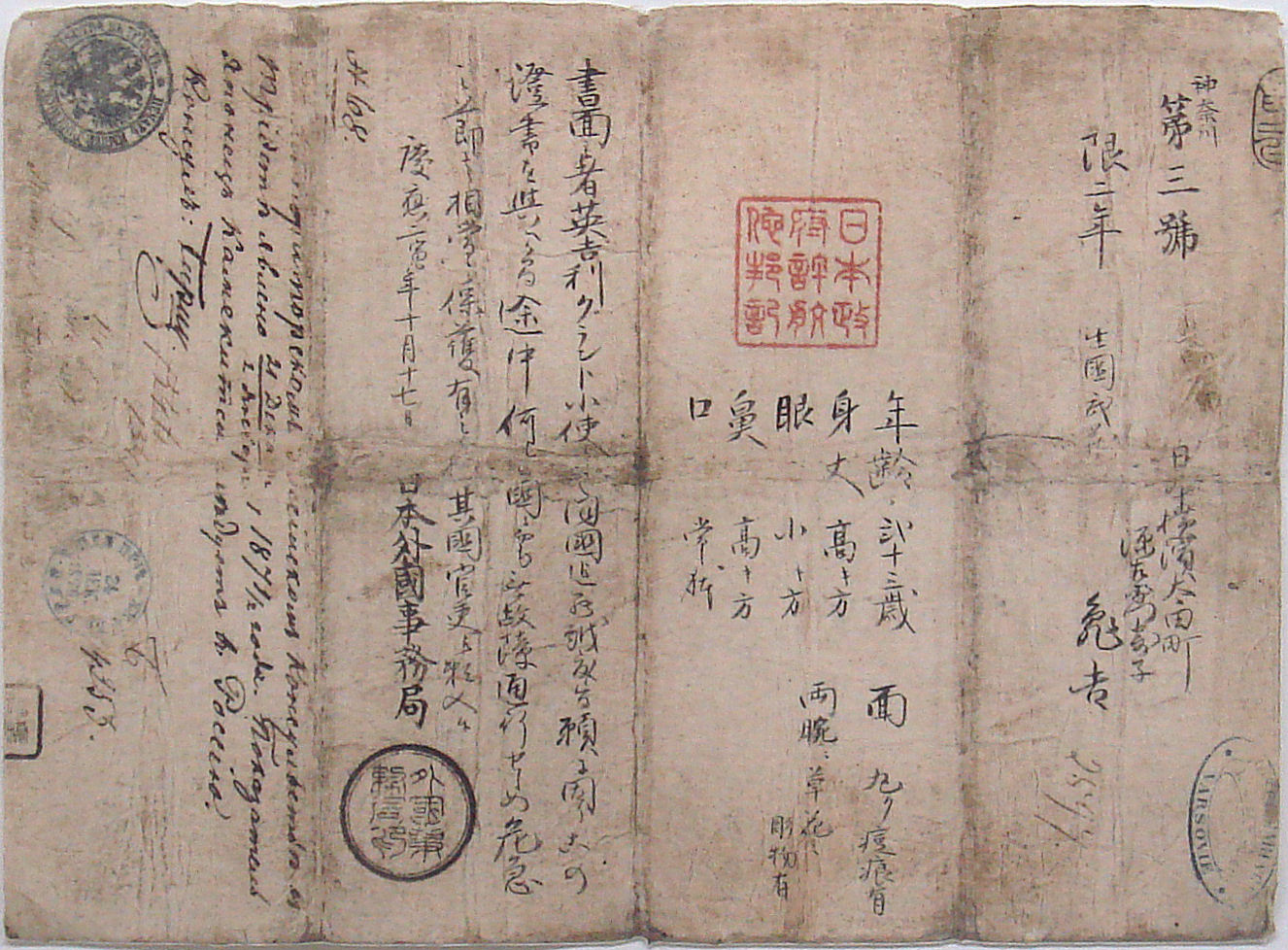
First Japanese passport, issued in 1866

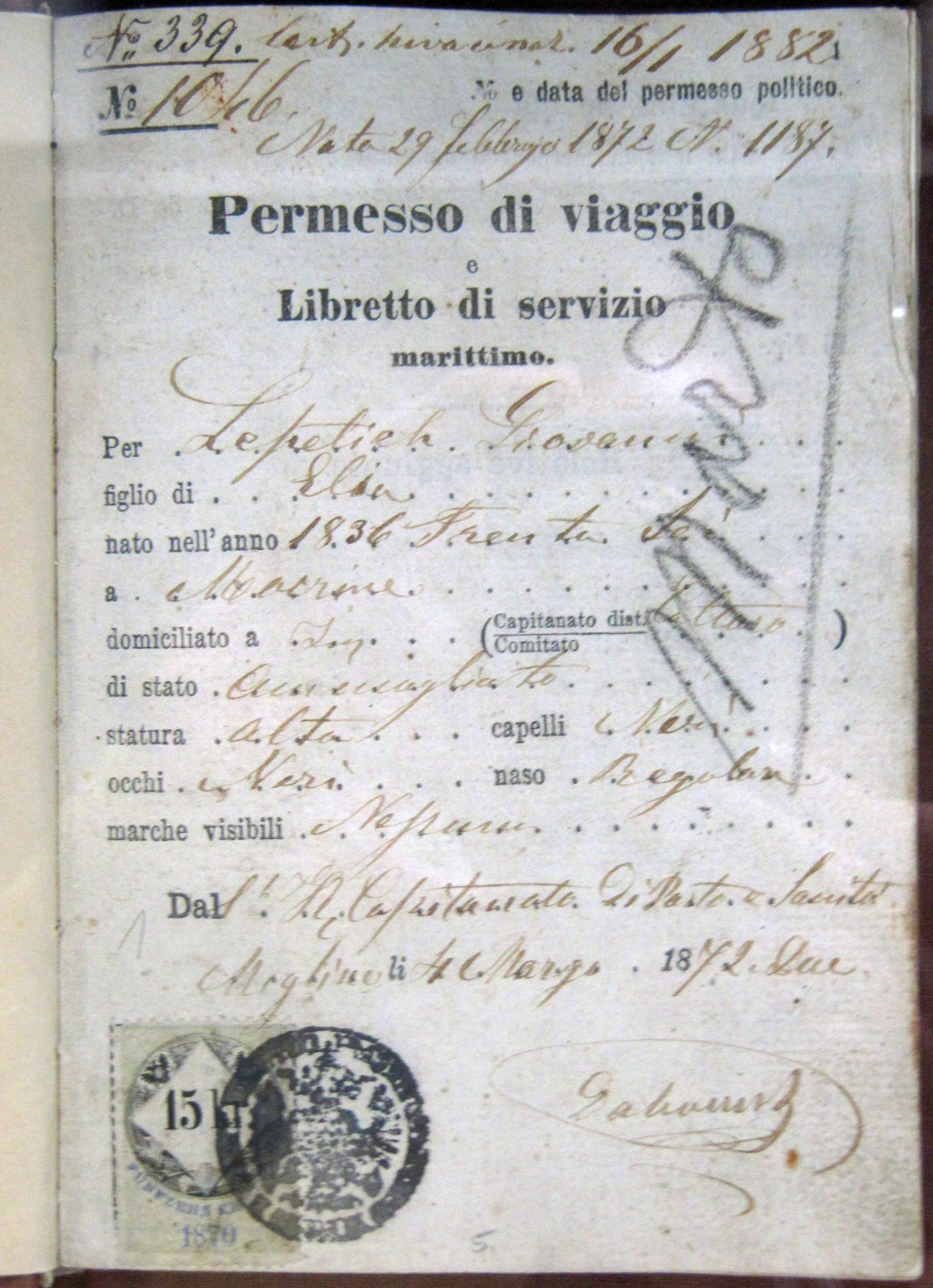
Italian passport, issued in 1872

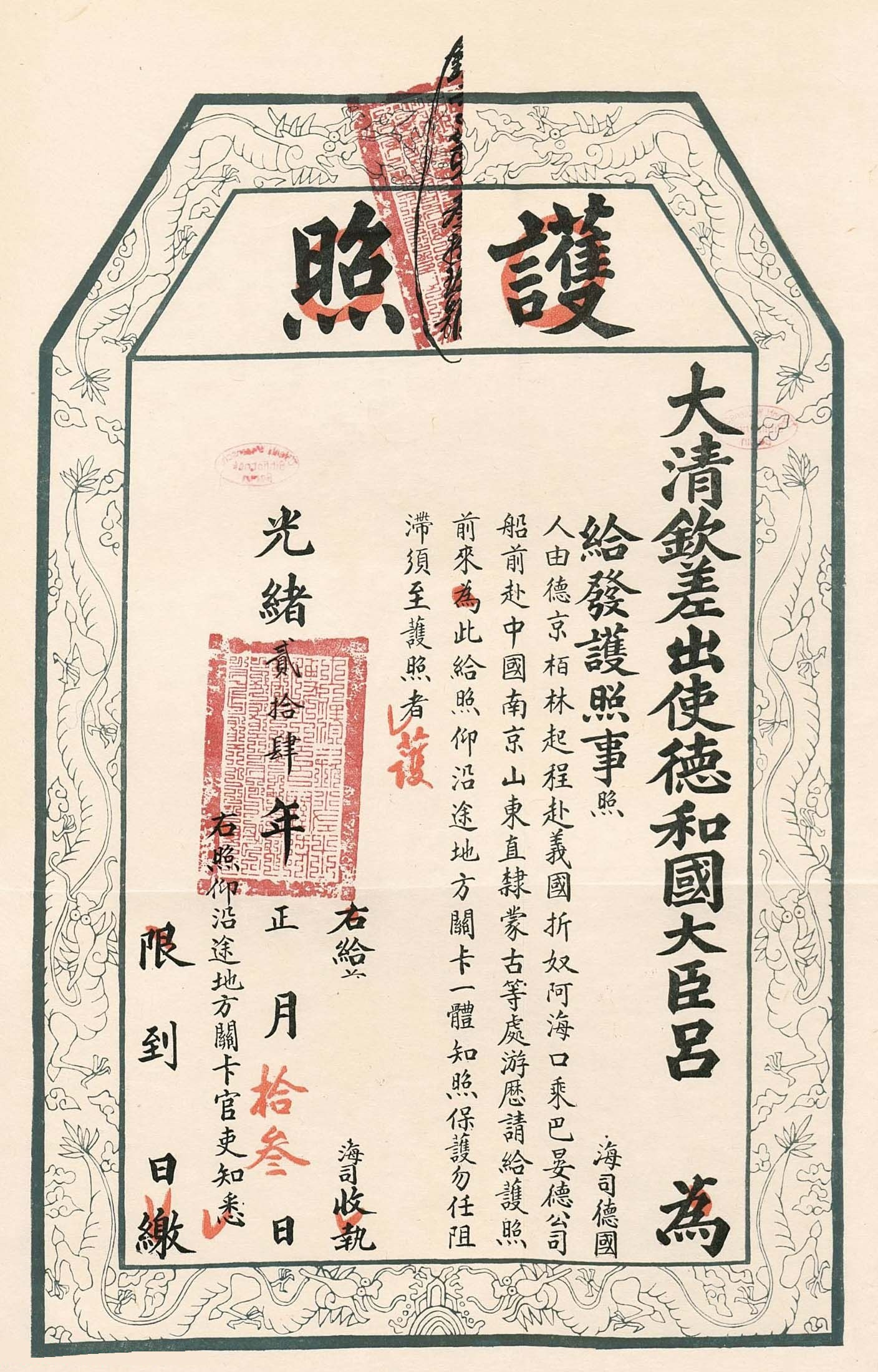
Chinese passport from the Qing dynasty, 24th Year of the Guangxu Reign, 1898

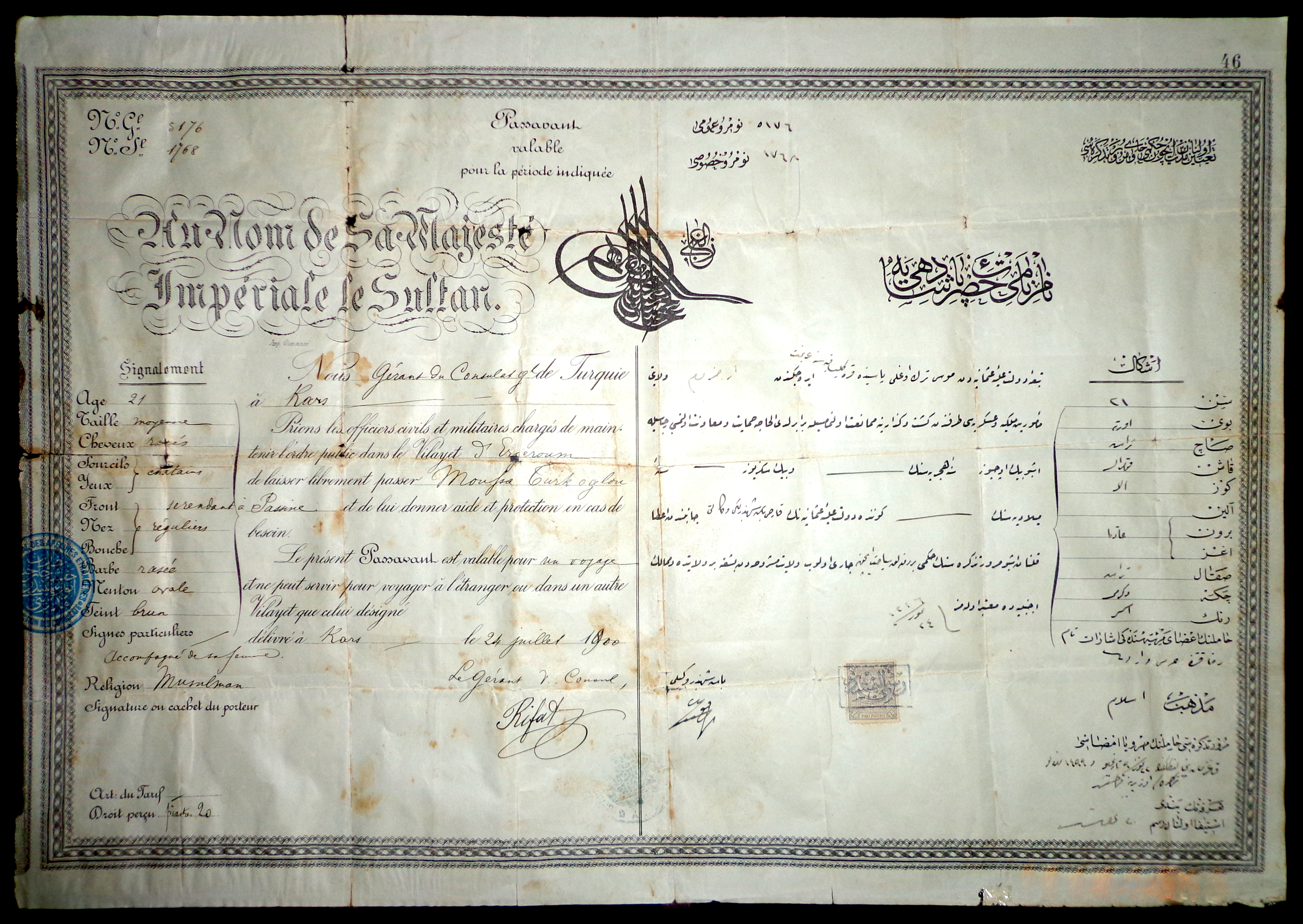
An Ottoman passport (passavant) issued to a Russian subject dated July 24, 1900

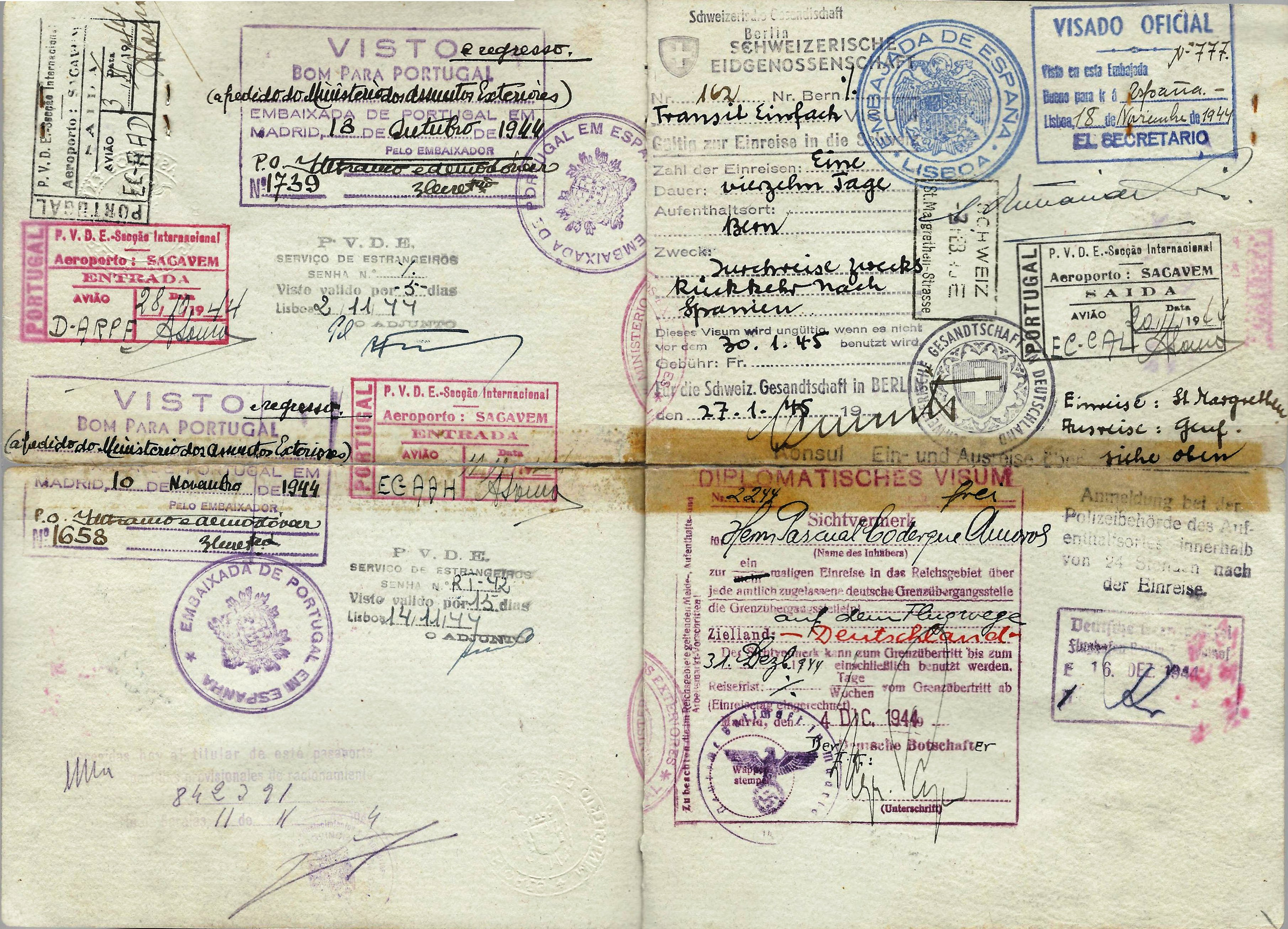
World War II Spanish official passport issued in late 1944 and used during the last six months of the war by an official being sent to Berlin

== Types ==
Governments around the world issue a variety of passports for different purposes. The most common variety are ordinary passports issued to individual citizens and other nationals. In the past, certain countries issued collective passports (Note: These were issued to defined groups for travel together to particular destinations, such as a group of school children on a school trip. As of 2021, collective passports are still issued by the United Kingdom for field-trips to certain countries within the Schengen Area.) or family passports. (Note: Family passports were typically issued to one passport holder, who may travel alone or with other family members included in the passport. A family member not listed as the passport holder could not use the passport for travel without the passport holder. These passports are essentially obsolete as most countries; including all the EU states, Canada, the United States, and the United Kingdom; require each traveller to have their own passport.) Today, passports are typically issued to individual travellers rather than groups. Aside from ordinary passports issued to citizens by national governments, there are a variety of other types of passports by governments in specific circumstances.

While individuals are typically only permitted to hold one passport, certain governments permit citizens to hold more than one ordinary passport. (Note: This may apply, for example, to people who travel a lot on business, and may need to have, say, a passport to travel on while another is awaiting a visa for another country. The UK for example may issue a second passport if the applicant can show a need and supporting documentation, such as a letter from an employer.) Individuals may also simultaneously hold an ordinary passport and an official or diplomatic passport.

=== Emergency passport ===
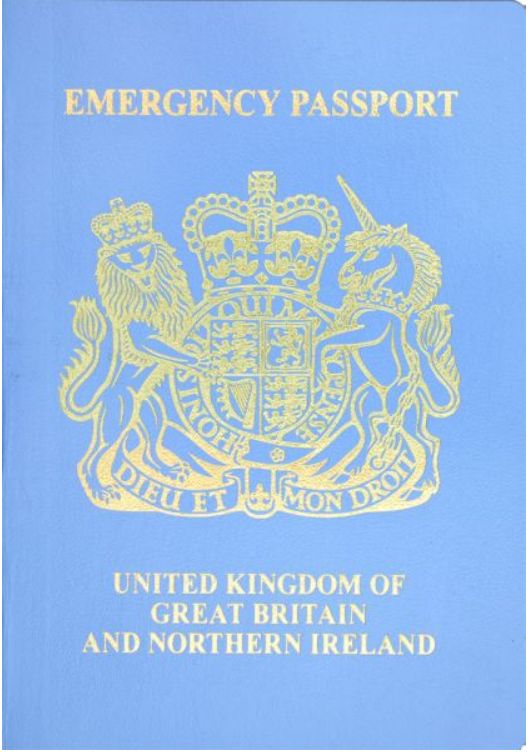
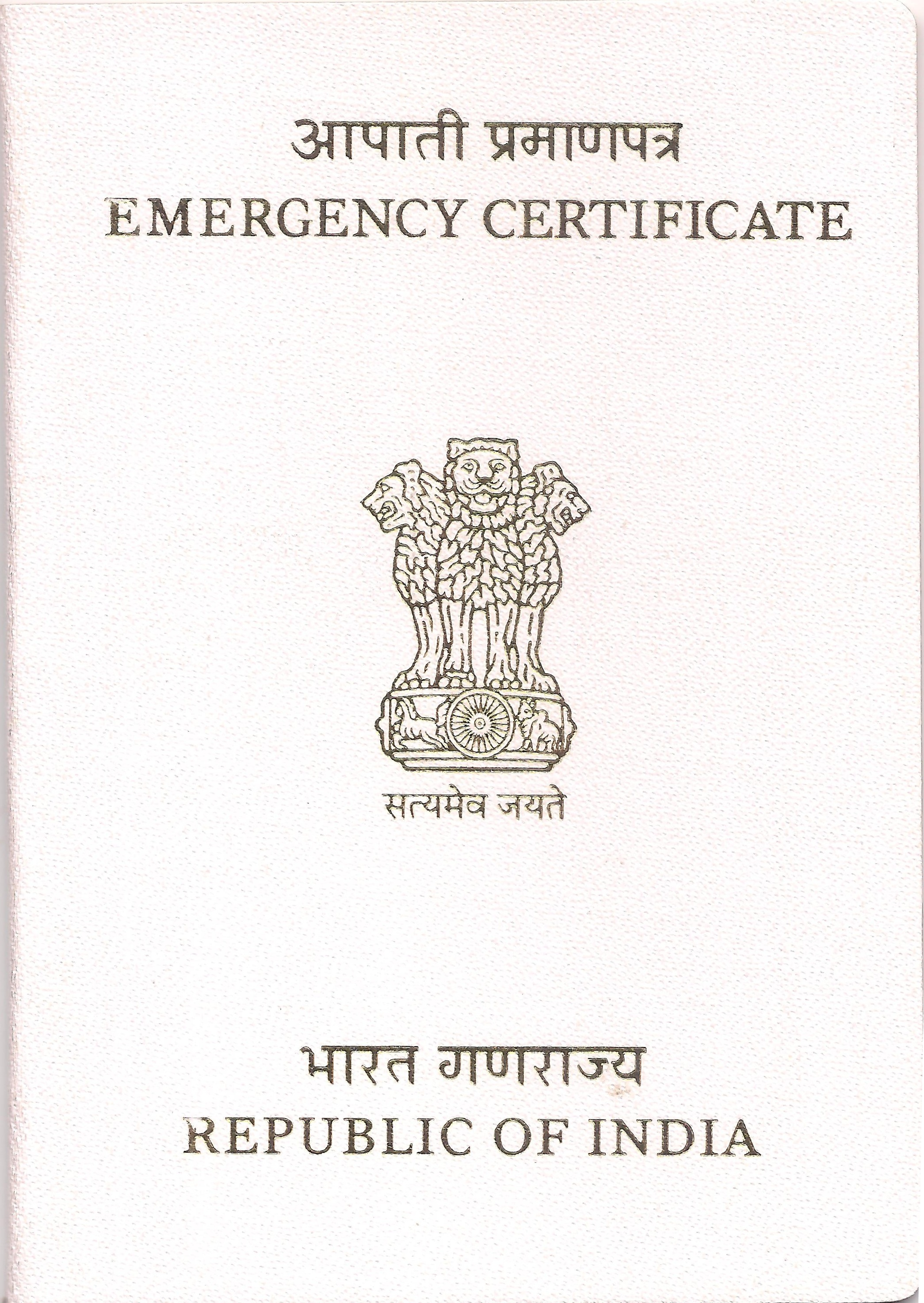
British and Indian emergency passports

Emergency passports (also called temporary passports) are issued to persons with urgent need to travel who do not have passports, e.g. someone abroad whose passport has been lost or stolen who needs to travel home within a few days, someone whose passport expires abroad, or someone who urgently needs to travel abroad who does not have a passport with sufficient validity. These passports are intended for very short durations, e.g. to allow immediate one-way travel back to the home country. Laissez-passer are also used for this purpose. Uniquely, the United Kingdom issues emergency passports to citizens of certain Commonwealth states who lose their passports in non-Commonwealth countries where their home state does not maintain a diplomatic or consular mission.

=== Diplomatic and official passports ===
Left to right: ordinary (dark blue), official (white), and diplomatic (maroon) passports of India.

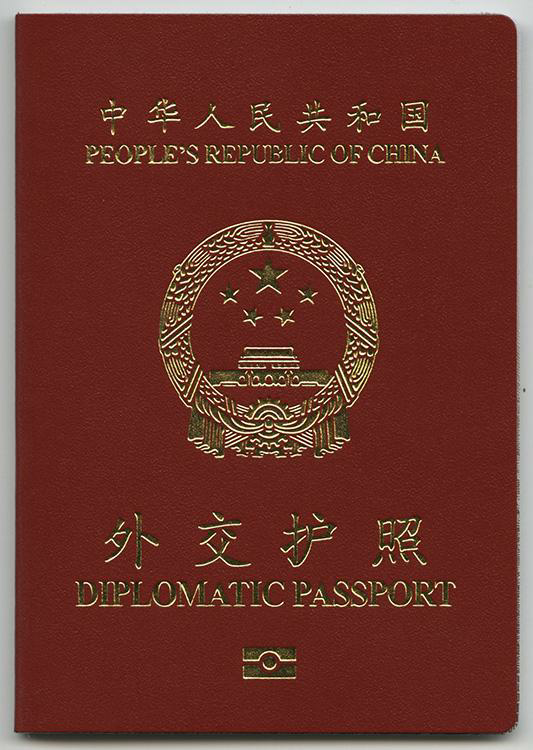
Diplomatic e-passport

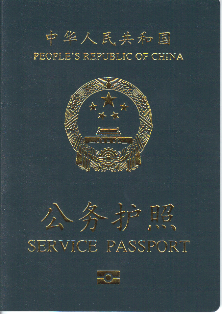
Service e-passport

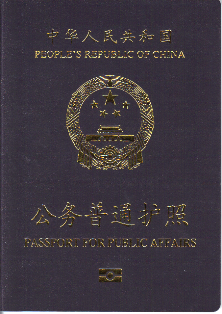
Public Affairs e-passport

Left to right: diplomatic, service, and public affairs passport from the People's Republic of China.
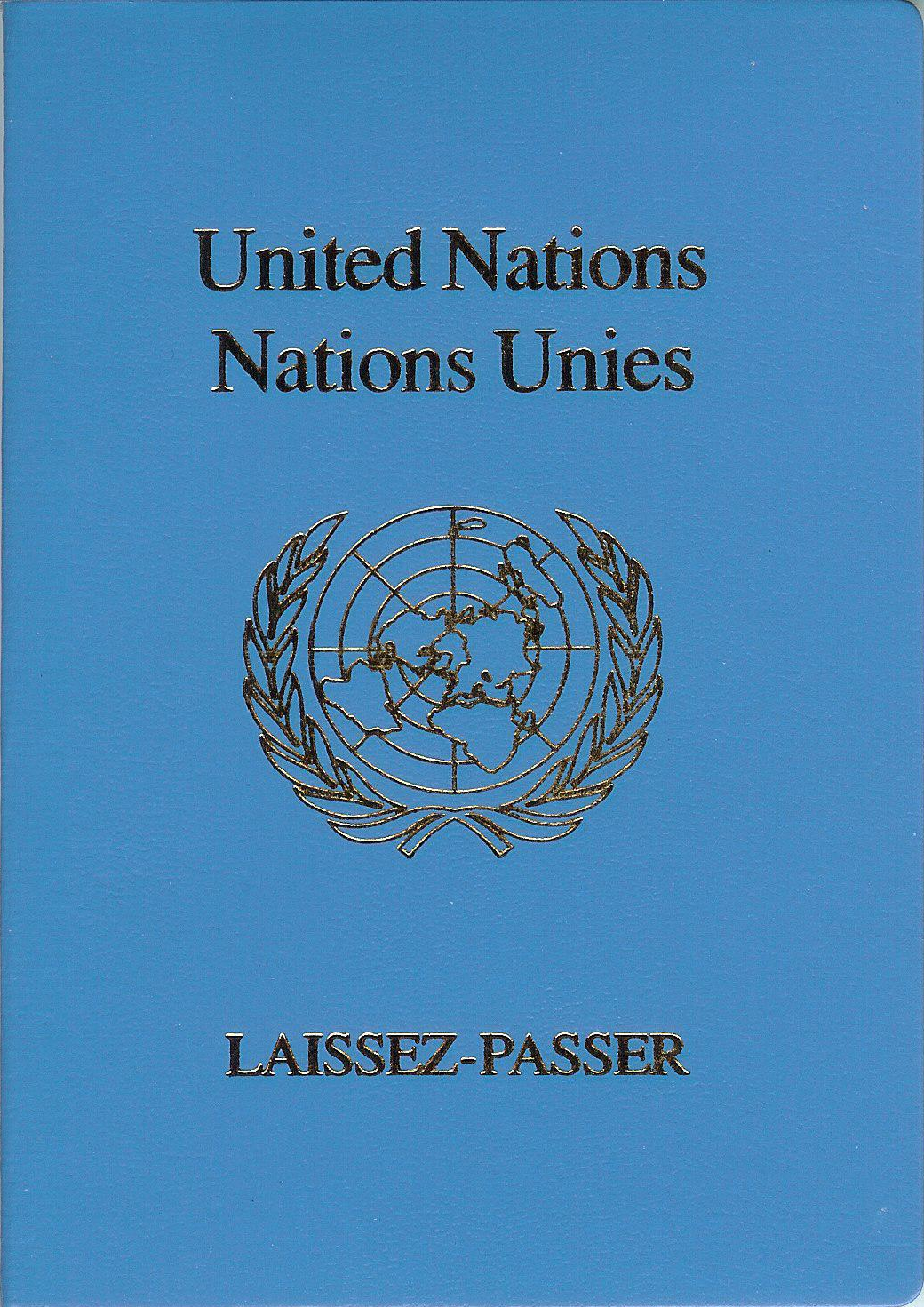
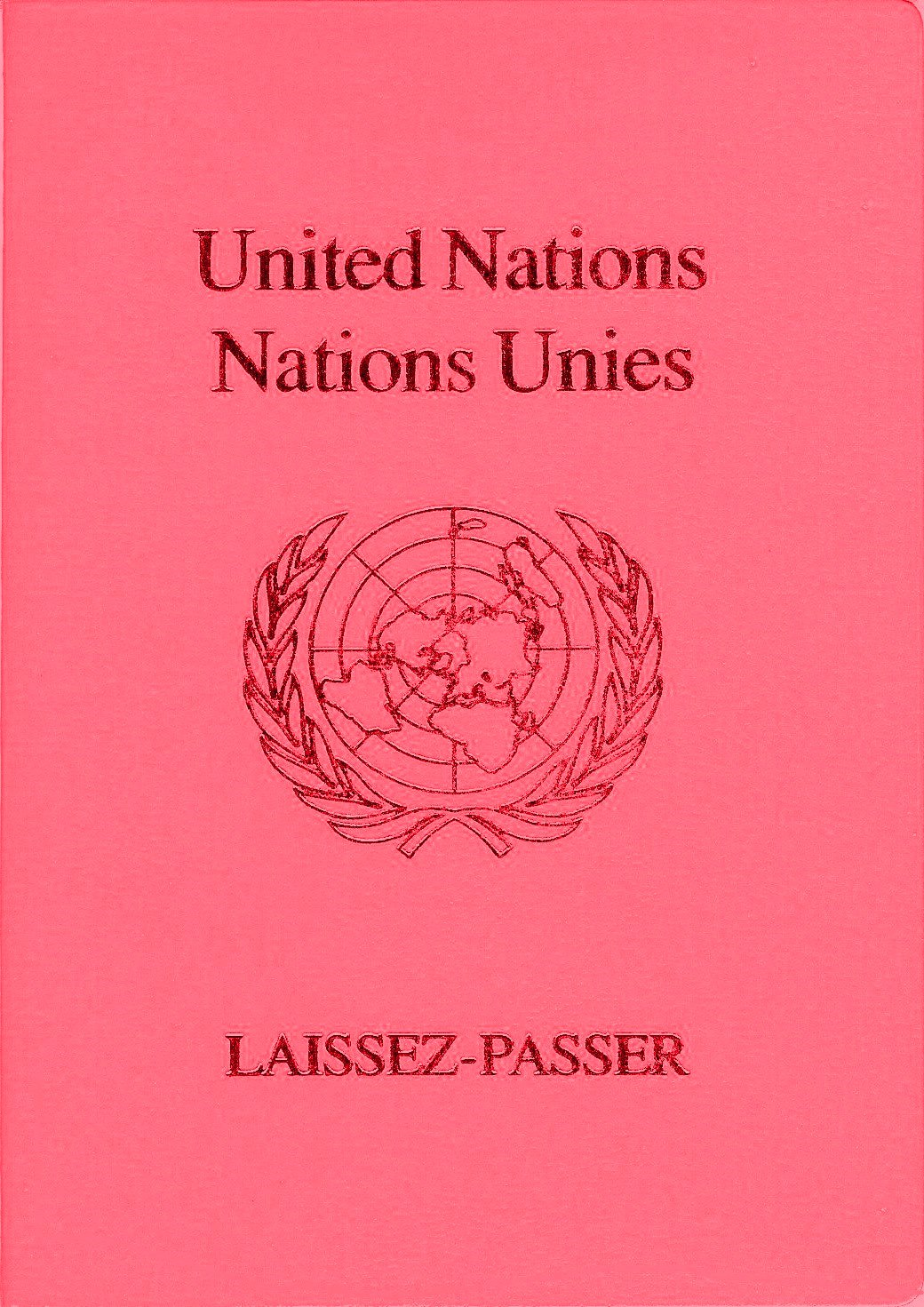
Left to right: United Nations Service (blue) and Diplomatic (red) laissez-passers

Pursuant to the Vienna Convention on Diplomatic Relations, Vienna Convention on Consular Relations, and the immunity afforded to officials of a foreign state under customary international law, diplomats and other individuals travelling on government business are entitled to reduced scrutiny at border checkpoints when travelling overseas. Consequently, such individuals are typically issued special passports indicating their status. These passports come in three distinct varieties:

==== Diplomatic passports ====
Typically issued to accredited diplomats, senior consular staff, heads of state or government, and to senior foreign ministry employees. Individuals holding diplomatic passports are usually entitled to certain degrees of immunity from border control inspections, depending on their home countries and their countries of entry.

==== Service/official passports ====
Issued to senior government officials travelling on state business who are not eligible for diplomatic passports. Holders of official passports are typically entitled to similar immunity from border control inspections. In the United States of America, official and service passports are two distinct categories of passport, with official passports being issued to senior government officials while service passports are issued to government contractors. (Note: Service Passports are issued by the Department of State to "certain non-personal services contractors who travel abroad in support of and pursuant to a contract with the U.S. government", to demonstrate the passport holder is travelling "to conduct work in support of the U.S. government while simultaneously indicating that the traveler has a more attenuated relationship with the U.S. government that does not justify a diplomatic or official passport.")

==== Public affairs passports ====
Issued to Chinese citizens holding senior positions in state-owned companies. While public affairs passports do not usually entitle their bearers to exemption from searches at border checkpoints, they are subject to more liberal visa policies in several countries primarily in Africa and Asia (see: Visa requirements for Chinese citizens).

=== Passports without right of abode ===
Unlike most countries, the United Kingdom and Taiwan/Republic of China (ROC) issue various categories of passports to individuals without the right of abode in their territory. In the United Kingdom's case, these passports are typically issued to individuals connected with a former British colony while, in the ROC's case, these passports are the result of the legal distinction between ROC nationals with and without residence in the area it administers. (Note: The area under the definition consists of: Taiwan (Chinese: 台灣); Penghu (Chinese: 澎湖); Kinmen (Chinese: 金門; pinyin: Jīnmén); Matsu Islands (Chinese: 馬祖列島; pinyin: Mǎzǔ Lièdǎo); Other nearby islands) In both cases, holders of such passports are able to obtain residence on an equal footing with foreigners by applying for indefinite leave to remain (UK) or a resident certificate (ROC).

==== Republic of China (Taiwan) ====
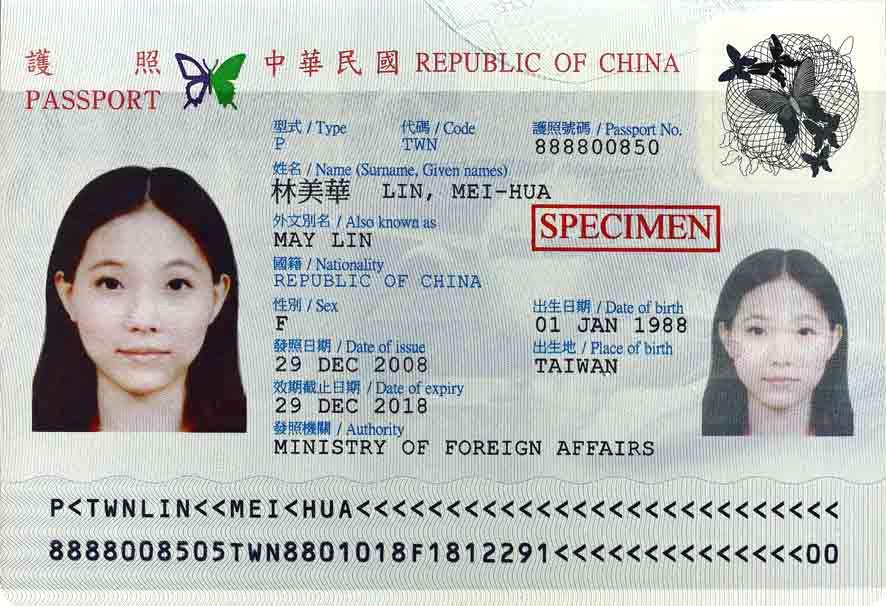
Sample ROC passport issued to NWOHRs. Note the absence of a national ID number.

A Republic of China citizen who does not have household registration (Chinese: 戶籍; pinyin: hùjí) in the area administered by the ROC is classified as a National Without Household Registration (NWOHR; Chinese: 無戶籍國民) and is subject to immigration controls when clearing ROC border controls, does not have automatic residence rights, and cannot vote in Taiwanese elections. However, they are exempt from conscription. Most individuals with this status are children born overseas to ROC citizens who do hold household registration. Additionally, because the ROC observes the principle of jus sanguinis, members of the overseas Chinese community are also regarded as citizens. During the Cold War, both the ROC and PRC governments actively sought the support of overseas Chinese communities in their attempts to secure the position as the legitimate sole government of China. The ROC also encouraged overseas Chinese businessmen to settle in Taiwan to facilitate economic development and regulations concerning evidence of ROC nationality by descent were particularly lax during the period, allowing many overseas Chinese the right to settle in Taiwan. About 60,000 NWOHRs currently hold Taiwanese passports with this status.

==== United Kingdom ====
The United Kingdom issues several similar but distinct passports which correspond to the country's several categories of nationality. Full British citizens are issued a standard British passport. British citizens resident in the Crown Dependencies may hold variants of the British passport which confirm their Isle of Man, Jersey, or Guernsey identity. Many of the other categories of nationality do not grant bearers right of abode in the United Kingdom itself.

British National (Overseas) passports are issued to individuals connected to Hong Kong prior to the territory's transfer from Britain to China. British Overseas Citizen passports are primarily issued to individuals who did not acquire the citizenship of the colony they were connected to when it obtained independence (or their stateless descendants). British Overseas Citizen passports are also issued to certain categories of Malaysian nationals in Penang and Malacca, and individuals connected to Cyprus as a result of the legislation granting independence to those former British colonies. British Protected Person passports are issued to otherwise stateless people connected to a former British protectorate. British subject passports are issued to otherwise stateless individuals connected to British India or to certain categories of Irish citizens (though, in the latter case, they do convey right of abode).

Additionally, individuals connected to a British overseas territory are accorded British Overseas Territories citizenship and may hold passports issued by the governments of their respective territory. All overseas territory citizens are also now eligible for full British citizenship. Each territory maintains its own criteria for determining whom it grants right of abode. Consequently, individuals holding BOTC passports are not necessarily entitled to enter or reside in the territory that issued their passport. Most countries distinguish between BOTC and other classes of British nationality for border control purposes. For instance, only Bermudian passport holders with an endorsement stating that they possess right of abode or belonger status in Bermuda are entitled to enter America without an electronic travel authorisation.

Border control policies in many jurisdictions distinguish between holders of passports with and without right of abode, including NWOHRs and holders of the various British passports that do not confer right of abode upon the bearer. Certain jurisdictions may additionally distinguish between holders of such British passports with and without indefinite leave to remain in the United Kingdom. NWOHRs do not, for instance, have access to the Visa Waiver Program, or to visa free access to the Schengen Area or Japan. Other countries, such as India which allows all Chinese nationals to apply for eVisas, do not make such a distinction. Notably, while Singapore does permit visa free entry to all categories of British passport holders, it reduces length of stay for British nationals without right of abode in the United Kingdom, but does not distinguish between ROC passport holders with and without household registration.

Until 31 January 2021, holders of British National (Overseas) (BN(O)) passports were able to use their UK passports for immigration clearance in Hong Kong and to seek consular protection from overseas Chinese diplomatic missions. This was a unique arrangement as it involved a passport issued by one state conferring right of abode (or, more precisely right to land) in and consular protection from another state. Since that date, the Chinese and Hong Kong governments have prohibited the use of BN(O) passports as travel documents or proof of identity and (similar to British Overseas Citizen, British Protected Person, or ROC NWOHR passports) is not associated with right of abode in any territory. BN(O)s who do not possess Chinese (or any other) nationality are required to use a Document of Identity for Visa Purposes for travel. This restriction disproportionally affects ease of travel for permanent residents of Indian, Pakistani, and Nepali ethnicity, who were not granted Chinese nationality in 1997. As an additional consequence, Hongkongers seeking early pre-retirement withdrawals from the Mandatory Provident Fund pension scheme may not use BN(O) passports for identity verification.

==== Latvia and Estonia ====
Similarly, non-citizens in Latvia and in Estonia are individuals, primarily of Russian or Ukrainian ethnicity, who are not citizens of Latvia or Estonia, but who have settled during the Soviet occupation, and thus have the right to a special non-citizen passport issued by the government as well as some other specific rights. Approximately two thirds of them are ethnic Russians, followed by ethnic Belarusians, ethnic Ukrainians, ethnic Poles and ethnic Lithuanians. According to the UN Special Rapporteur, the citizenship and naturalization laws in Latvia "are seen by the Russian community as discriminatory practices". Per Russian visa policy, holders of the Estonian alien's passport or the Latvian non-citizen passport are entitled to visa free entry to Russia, in contrast to Estonian and Latvian citizens who must obtain an electronic visa.

=== Regional and subnational passports ===
==== China ====
The People's Republic of China (PRC) authorises its Special Administrative Regions of Hong Kong and Macau to issue passports to their permanent residents with Chinese nationality under the "one country, two systems" arrangement. Visa policies imposed by foreign authorities on Hong Kong and Macau permanent residents holding such passports are different from those holding ordinary passports of the People's Republic of China. A Hong Kong Special Administrative Region passport (HKSAR passport) and Macau Special Administrative Region passport (MSAR passport) gain visa-free access to many more countries than ordinary PRC passports.

On 1 July 2011, the Ministry of Foreign Affairs of the People's Republic of China launched a trial issuance of e-passports for individuals conducting public affairs work overseas on behalf of the Chinese government. The face, fingerprints, and other biometric features of the passport holder is digitized and stored in pre-installed contactless smart chip, along with "the passport owner's name, sex and personal photo as well as the passport's term of validity and [the] digital certificate of the chip". Ordinary biometric passports were introduced by the Ministry of Public Security on 15 May 2012. As of January 2015, all new passports issued by China are biometric e-passports, and non-biometric passports are no longer issued.

In 2012, over 38 million Chinese citizens held ordinary passports, comprising only 2.86 percent of the total population at the time. In 2014, China issued 16 million passports, ranking first in the world, surpassing the United States (14 million) and India (10 million). The number of ordinary passports in circulation rose to 120 million by October 2016, which was approximately 8.7 percent of the population. As of April 2017 to date, China had issued over 100 million biometric ordinary passports.

==== Kingdom of Denmark ====
The three constituent countries of the Danish Realm have a common nationality. Denmark proper is a member of the European Union, but Greenland and Faroe Islands are not. Danish citizens residing in Greenland or Faroe Islands can choose between holding a Danish EU passport and a Greenlandic or Faroese non-EU Danish passport.

As of 21 September 2022, Danish citizens had visa-free or visa on arrival access to 188 countries and territories, thus ranking the Danish passport fifth in the world (tied with the passports of Austria, the Netherlands, and Sweden) according to the Henley Passport Index. According to the World Tourism Organization 2016 report, the Danish passport is first in the world (tied with Finland, Germany, Italy, Luxembourg, Singapore, and the United Kingdom) in terms of travel freedom, with the mobility index of 160 (out of 215 with no visa weighted by 1, visa on arrival weighted by 0.7, eVisa by 0.5 and traditional visa weighted by 0).

==== Serbian Coordination Directorate Passports in Kosovo ====
Under Serbian law, people born or otherwise legally settled in Kosovo (Note: Kosovo is the subject of a territorial dispute between the Republic of Kosovo and the Republic of Serbia. The Republic of Kosovo unilaterally declared independence on 17 February 2008. Serbia continues to claim it as part of its own sovereign territory. The two governments began to normalise relations in 2013, as part of the 2013 Brussels Agreement. Kosovo is currently recognised as an independent state by 110 out of the 193 United Nations member states. In total, 118 UN member states have recognised Kosovo at some point, of which eight later withdrew their recognition.) are considered Serbian nationals and as such they are entitled to a Serbian passport. However, these passports are not issued directly by the Serbian Ministry of Internal Affairs but by the Serbian Coordination Directorate for Kosovo and Metohija instead. These particular passports do not allow the holder to enter the Schengen Area without a visa.

As of August 2023, Serbian citizens had visa-free or visa on arrival access to 138 countries and territories, ranking the Serbian passport 38th overall in terms of travel freedom according to the Henley Passport Index. The Serbian passport is one of the 5 passports with the most improved rating globally since 2006, in terms of the number of countries that its holders may visit without a visa.

==== American Samoa ====
Although all U.S. citizens are also U.S. nationals, the reverse is not true. As specified in 8 U.S.C. § 1408, a person whose only connection to the United States is through birth in an outlying possession (which is defined in 8 U.S.C. § 1101 as American Samoa and Swains Island, the latter of which is administered as part of American Samoa), or through descent from a person so born, acquires U.S. nationality but not the citizenship. This was formerly the case in a few other current or former U.S. overseas possessions, i.e. the Panama Canal Zone and Trust Territory of the Pacific Islands. The passport issued to non-citizen nationals contains the endorsement code 9 which states: "THE BEARER IS A UNITED STATES NATIONAL AND NOT A UNITED STATES CITIZEN." on the annotations page. Non-citizen nationals may reside and work in the United States without restrictions, and may apply for citizenship under the same rules as resident aliens. Like resident aliens, they are not presently allowed by any U.S. state to vote in federal or state elections.

=== Passports issued by entities without sovereign territory ===
Several entities without a sovereign territory issue documents described as passports, most notably the Haudenosaunee Confederacy (Haudenosaunee passport), the Aboriginal Provisional Government (Aboriginal passport) in Australia and the Sovereign Military Order of Malta (Sovereign Military Order of Malta passport). Such documents are not necessarily accepted for entry into a country.

== Details and specifications ==
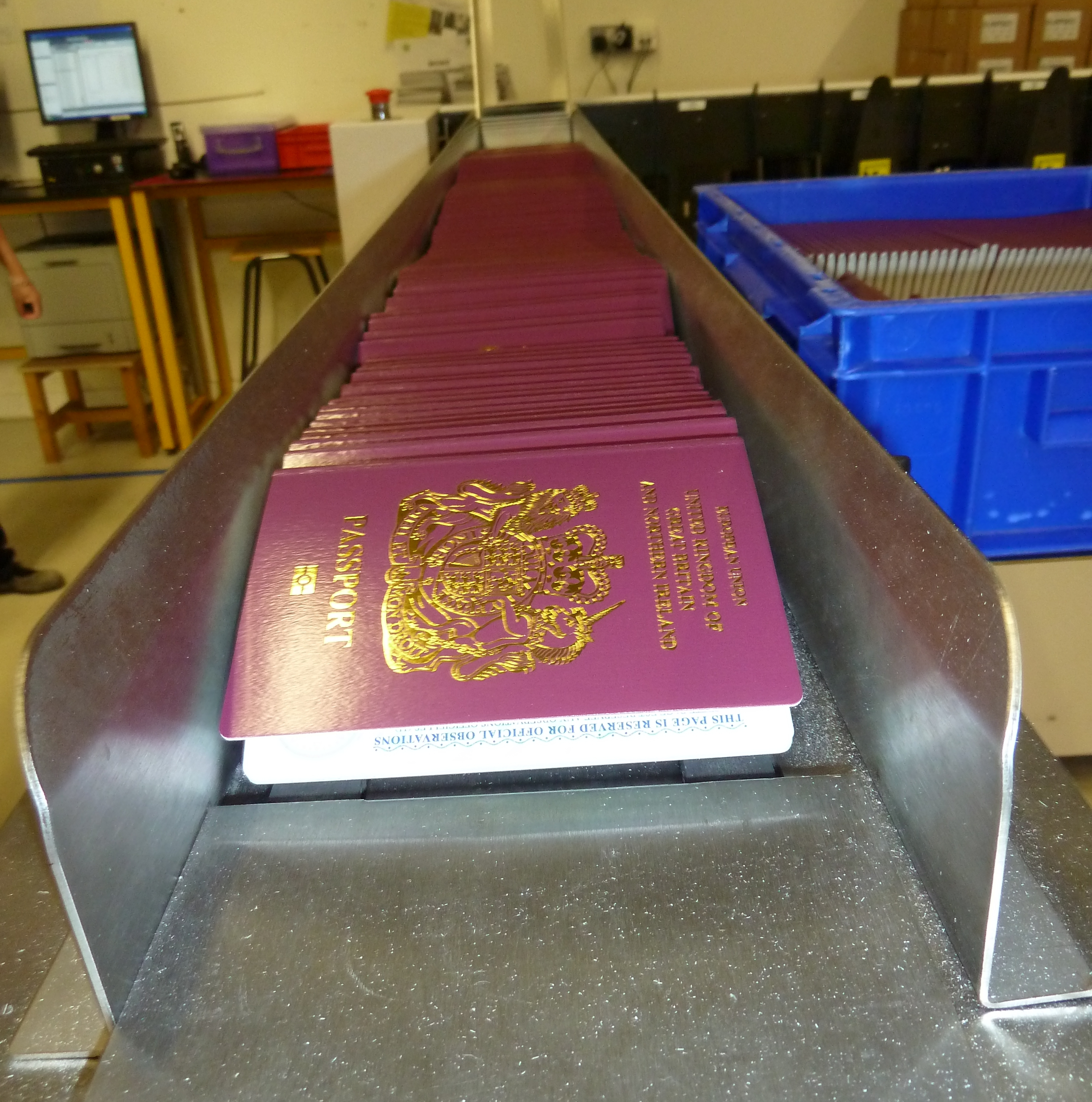
In 2013, more than 5 million British passports were printed each year—one every 2.5 seconds—at a secret location in the north of England. As of 2022 they are made by Thales DIS in Poland.

=== Criteria for issuance ===
Each country sets its own conditions for the issue of passports. Under the law of most countries, passports are government property, and may be limited or revoked at any time, usually on specified grounds, and possibly subject to judicial review. In many countries, surrender of one's passport is a condition of granting bail in lieu of imprisonment for a pending criminal trial due to the risk of the person leaving the country. When passport holders apply for a new passport (commonly, due to expiration of the previous passport, insufficient validity for entry to some countries or lack of blank pages), they may be required to surrender the old passport for invalidation. In some circumstances an expired passport is not required to be surrendered or invalidated (for example, if it contains an unexpired visa).

Requirements for passport applicants vary significantly from country to country, with some states imposing stricter measures than others. For example, Pakistan requires applicants to be interviewed before a Pakistani passport will be granted. When applying for a passport or a national ID card, all Pakistanis are required to sign an oath declaring Mirza Ghulam Ahmad to be an impostor prophet and all Ahmadis to be non-Muslims. In contrast, individuals holding British National (Overseas) status are legally entitled to hold a passport in that capacity.

Countries with conscription or national service requirements may impose restrictions on passport applicants who have not yet completed their military obligations. For example, in Finland, male citizens aged 18–30 years must prove that they have completed, or are exempt from, their obligatory military service to be granted an unrestricted passport; otherwise a passport is issued valid only until the end of their 28th year, to ensure that they return to carry out military service. Other countries with obligatory military service, such as South Korea and Syria, have similar requirements, e.g. South Korean passport and Syrian passport.

=== Validity ===
Passports have a limited validity, usually between 5 and 10 years. Many countries require passports to be valid for a minimum of six months beyond the planned date of departure, as well as having at least two to four blank pages. It is recommended that a passport be valid for at least six months from the departure date as many airlines deny boarding to passengers whose passport has a shorter expiry date, even if the destination country does not have such a requirement for incoming visitors.

There is an increasing trend for adult passports to be valid for ten years, such as a United Kingdom passport, United States Passport, New Zealand Passport (after 30 November 2015) or Australian passport.

Some countries issue passports that are valid for longer than 10 years, which the ICAO does not recommend due to their security concerns. Some countries, including all member states of the European Union, do not accept passports older than 10 years.

=== Cover designs ===
Colours across the world for modern passport booklet covers

Passport booklets from almost all countries around the world display the national coat of arms of the issuing country on the front cover. The United Nations keeps a record of national coats of arms, but displaying a coat of arms is not an internationally recognised requirement for a passport.

There are several groups of countries that have, by mutual agreement, adopted common designs for their passports:

- The European Union. The design and layout of passports of the member states of the European Union are a result of consensus and recommendation, rather than of directive. Passports are issued by member states and may consist of either the usual passport booklet or the newer passport card format. The covers of ordinary passport booklets are burgundy-red (except for Croatia which has a blue cover), with "European Union" written in the national language or languages. Below that are the name of the country, the national coat of arms, the word or words for "passport", and, at the bottom, the symbol for a biometric passport. The data page can be at the front or at the back of a passport booklet and there are significant design differences throughout to indicate which member state is the issuer. Member states that participate in the Schengen Agreement have agreed that their e-passports should contain fingerprint information in the chip.
- In 2006, the members of the CA-4 Treaty (Guatemala, El Salvador, Honduras, and Nicaragua) adopted a common-design passport, called the Central American passport, following a design already in use by Nicaragua and El Salvador since the mid-1990s. It features a navy-blue cover with the words "América Central" and a map of Central America, and with the territory of the issuing country highlighted in gold (in place of the individual nations' coats of arms). At the bottom of the cover are the name of the issuing country and the passport type.
- The members of the Andean Community of Nations (Bolivia, Colombia, Ecuador, and Peru) began to issue commonly designed passports in 2005. Specifications for the common passport format were outlined in an Andean Council of Foreign Ministers meeting in 2002. Previously issued national passports will be valid until their expiry dates. Andean passports are bordeaux (burgundy-red), with words in gold. Centred above the national seal of the issuing country is the name of the regional body in Spanish (Comunidad Andina). Below the seal is the official name of the member country. At the bottom of the cover is the Spanish word "pasaporte" along with the English "passport". Venezuela had issued Andean passports, but has subsequently left the Andean Community, so they will no longer issue Andean passports.
- The Union of South American Nations had signaled an intention to establish a common passport design, but it is doubtful that this will happen since the group effectively broke up in 2019.
- Twelve member states of the Caribbean Community (CARICOM) began issuing passports with a common design since early 2009. It features the CARICOM symbol along with the national coat of arms and name of the member state, rendered in a CARICOM official language (English, French, Dutch). The member states which use the common design are Antigua and Barbuda, Barbados, Belize, Dominica, Grenada, Guyana, Jamaica, Saint Kitts and Nevis, Saint Lucia, Saint Vincent and the Grenadines, Suriname, and Trinidad and Tobago. There was a movement by the Organisation of Eastern Caribbean States (OECS) to issue a common designed passport, but the implementation of the CARICOM passport made that redundant, and it was abandoned.

=== Request page ===
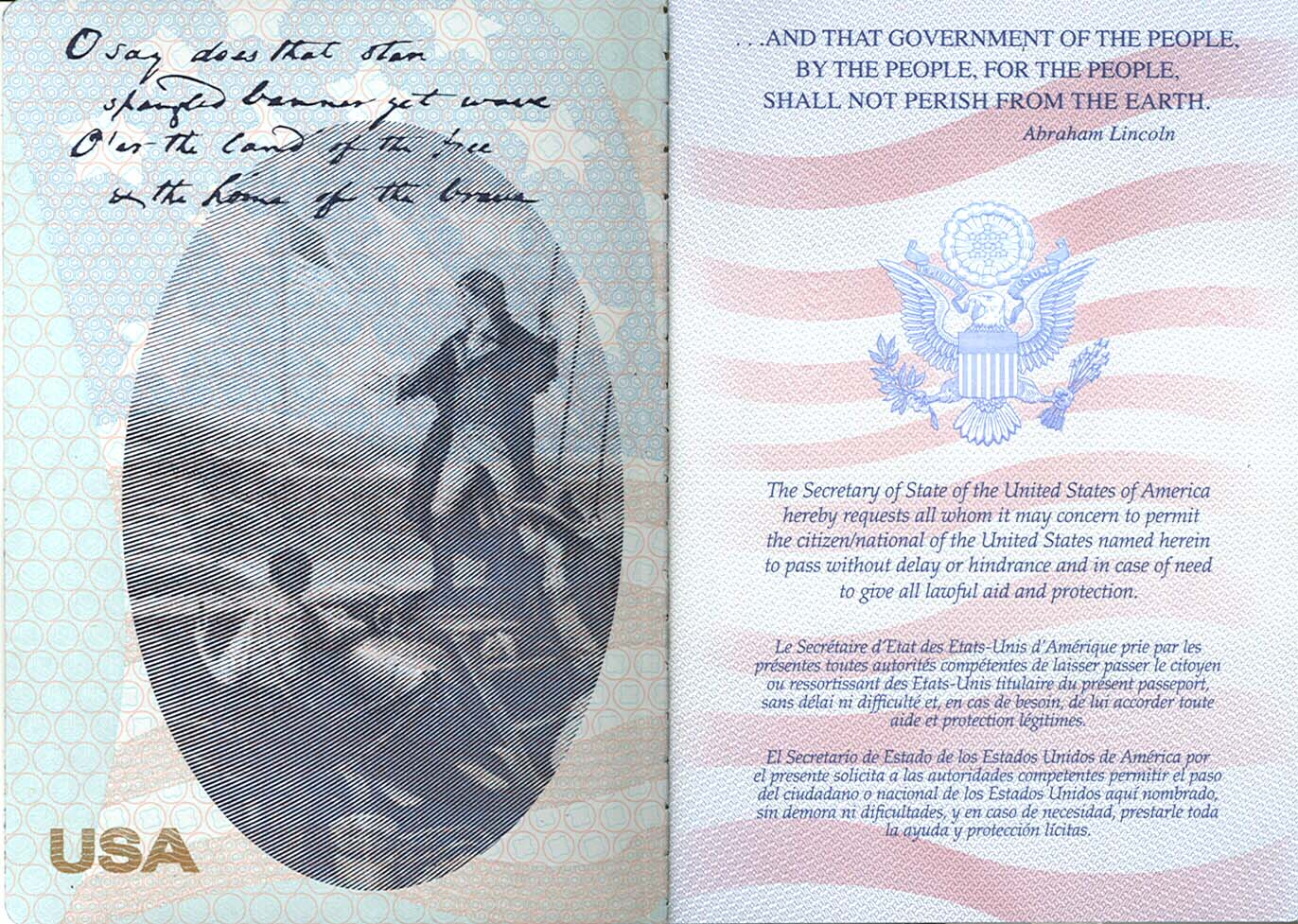
Passport message found inside the United States passport

Passports sometimes contain a message, usually near the front, requesting that the passport's bearer be allowed to pass freely, and further requesting that, in the event of need, the bearer be granted assistance. The message is sometimes made in the name of the government or the head of state, and may be written in more than one language, depending on the language policies of the issuing authority.

=== Languages ===
In 1920, an international conference on passports and through tickets held by the League of Nations recommended that passports be issued in the French language, historically the language of diplomacy, and one other language. Currently, the ICAO recommends that passports be issued in English, French, and Spanish; or in the national language of the issuing country and in either English, French, or Spanish. Many European countries use their national language, along with English and French.

Some additional language combinations are:

- National passports of the European Union bear all of the official languages of the European Union. Two or three languages are printed at the relevant points, followed by reference numbers which point to the passport page where translations into the remaining languages appear.
- Algerian, Chadian, Lebanese, Mauritanian, Moroccan and Tunisian passports are in three languages: Arabic, English, and French.
- The Barbadian passport and the United States passport are tri-lingual: English, French and Spanish. United States passports were English and French since 1976, but began being printed with a Spanish message and labels during the late 1990s, in recognition of Puerto Rico's Spanish-speaking status. Since 2007, the Data Page, which contains photo, identifying information, and the passport's issuance and expiration dates, and the Personal Data and Emergency Contact page are written in English, French, and Spanish; the cover and instructions pages are printed solely in English.
- On Belgian passports, all three official languages (Dutch, French, German) appear on the cover, in addition to English on the main page. The order of the official languages depends on the official residence of the holder.
- Passports of Bosnia and Herzegovina are in the three official languages of Bosnian, Serbian and Croatian in addition to English.
- Brazilian passports contain four languages: Portuguese, the official country language; Spanish, because of bordering nations; English and French.
- British passports bear English and French on the information page and Spanish, Welsh, Irish and Scottish Gaelic translations on an extra page.
- Cypriot passports are in Greek, Turkish and English.
- Haitian passports are in French and Haitian Creole.
- Passports issued by the Holy See are in Latin (the language of the Catholic Church), French, and English.
- The first page of the old Libyan passport (green cover) was in Arabic only. The current passport has dark-blue cover, is electronically readable, and has Arabic with English translation in the first page (first page from a right-to-left script viewpoint). Similar arrangements are found in the passports of some other Arab countries.
- Iraqi passports are in Arabic, Kurdish and English.
- Macau SAR passports are in three languages: Chinese (in traditional Chinese characters), Portuguese and English.
- New Zealand passports are in English and te reo Māori.
- Norwegian passports are in the two forms of the Norwegian language (Bokmål and Nynorsk), Northern Sami and English.
- Sri Lankan passports are in Sinhala, Tamil and English.
- Swiss passports are in five languages: German, French, Italian, Romansh and English.

== Limitations on use ==
A passport is merely an identity document that is widely recognised for international travel purposes, and the possession of a passport does not in itself entitle a traveller to enter any country other than the country that issued it, and sometimes not even then, as with holders of the British Overseas citizen passport. Many countries normally require visitors to obtain a visa. Each country has different requirements or conditions for the grant of visas, such as for the visitor not being likely to become a public charge for financial, health, family, or other reasons, and the holder not having been convicted of a crime or considered likely to commit one. Where a country does not recognise another, or is in dispute with it, entry may be prohibited to holders of passports of the other party to the dispute, and sometimes to others who have, for example, visited the other country; examples are listed below. A country that issues a passport may also restrict its validity or use in specified circumstances, such as use for travel to certain countries for political, security, or health reasons.

Many nations implement border controls restricting the entry of people of certain nationalities or who have visited certain countries. For instance, Georgia refuses entry to holders of passports issued by the Republic of China. Similarly, since April 2017, nationals of Bangladesh, Pakistan, Sudan, Syria, Yemen, and Iran have been banned from entering the parts of eastern Libya under the control of the Tobruk government. The Pakistani passports explicitly mention that these passports are valid in all countries except Israel. The majority of Arab countries, as well as Iran and Malaysia, ban Israeli citizens; however, exceptional entry to Malaysia is possible with approval from the Ministry of Home Affairs. Certain countries may also restrict entry to those with Israeli stamps or visas in their passports. As a result of tension over the former Republic of Artsakh dispute, Azerbaijan currently forbids entry to Armenian citizens as well as to individuals with proof of travel to Artsakh.

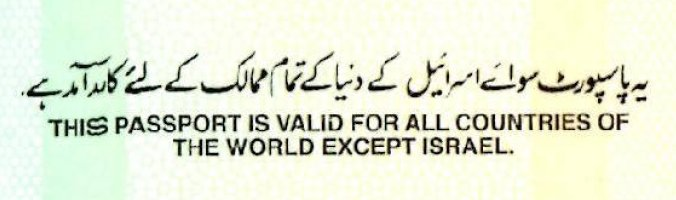
Text on a Pakistani passport saying that the passport is not valid for Israel.

Between September 2017 and January 2021, the United States of America did not issue new visas to nationals of Iran, North Korea, Libya, Somalia, Syria, or Yemen pursuant to restrictions imposed by the Trump administration, which were subsequently repealed by the Biden administration on 20 January 2021. Similarly, the United States of America does not issue new visas to nationals of Afghanistan, Chad, Republic of the Congo, Equatorial Guinea, Eritrea, Haiti, Iran, Libya, Myanmar, Somalia, Sudan, and Yemen, as well as limiting the entry of nationals from Burundi, Cuba, Laos, Sierra Leone, Togo, Turkmenistan, and Venezuela. The restrictions were/are conditional and could be lifted if the countries affected met the required security standards specified by the Trump administration. Dual citizens of these countries could/can still enter the United States of America if they presented a passport from a non-designated country.

== Value ==
Singaporean Passport, the world's strongest passport as of 2026

One method by which to rank the value of a passport is to calculate its mobility score (MS). The mobility score of a passport is the number of countries that allow the holder of that passport to enter for general tourism visa-free, visa-on-arrival, eTA, or eVisa issued within 3 days. As of 2026, the strongest passport in the world is the Singaporean passport.

However, another way to determine passport mobility score is the number of countries it allows holders to live and work in. For example, by this measure, the Irish passport would be most powerful because it allows the holder to live in all European Union/European Economic Area countries, as well as Switzerland and the United Kingdom, as the Irish passport is the only European Union passport now that still allows its users the right to live/work in the United Kingdom.

== Fraud ==
Passport fraud is an act of intentional deception that involves forgery, alteration, or false use of a travel document in a false or unauthorized manner. Common reasons to perpetrate passport fraud include identity theft, illegally entering a country, avoiding deportation, committing financial crimes, and smuggling. Passport fraud can be committed in various ways using both legal and illegal documents. For example, via falsely obtaining identity documents, document forgery or modifying an existing passport.

A fake passport is a counterfeit of a passport (or other travel document) issued by a nation or authorised agency. Such counterfeits are copies of genuine passports, or illicitly modified genuine passports made by unauthorized persons, sometimes called cobblers. Its purpose is to be used deceptively as if it were a legitimate travel or identity document. A passport obtained from an authorized issuer by providing false information may also be considered fake. They are sometimes known as fraudulently obtained genuine (i.e. 'FOG') passports - as the document itself is an authentically issued book from an authorised agency, except that the holder's identity is false.

=== Fictitious passports ===
People may also make use of camouflage passport, which are otherwise legal to create, in fraudulent circumstances. Camouflage passports are not copies of a valid form of document, but are designed to look like a passport issued by a body that cannot issue legitimate passports, such as "Republic of Mainau", or a "Baltic Trade Mission" diplomatic document. Fantasy passports, such as the World Passport, are passport-like documents issued by non-official organizations or micronations as a novelty or souvenir, to make a political statement, or to show loyalty to a political or other cause.

=== History ===
Passport fraud is a worldwide issue. By 1977, the US State Department recorded approximately 900 cases of passport fraud annually. In 1940, members of the American Communist Party, Earl Browder and Welwel Warszower, were convicted for unlawful use of passports. In 2017 a significant state-level passport fraud was exposed by CNN, who alleged that the Venezuelan embassy in Iraq was issuing passports to members of Hezbollah.

==== Incidents ====
The "Great Train Robber" Ronnie Biggs entered Australia in 1965 with a fake passport, following his escape from prison. His wife and children also used fake passports to join him the following year.

In October 2000, Alexander Litvinenko (Russian dissident and writer) fled to Turkey from Ukraine on a forged passport using the alias Chris Reid, as his actual passport was impounded by Russian authorities after criminal charges were filed against him.

A fake passport scandal was revealed in European football in 2001, as players from outside the European Union used fake documents to avoid quotas.

In May 2001, Kim Jong-nam, the son of North Korean leader Kim Jong-il, was arrested at Narita International Airport, in Tokyo, Japan, travelling on a fake Dominican Republic passport. He was detained by immigration officials and later deported to the People's Republic of China. The incident caused Kim Jong-il to cancel a planned visit to China due to the embarrassment caused by the incident.

In June 2005, American actor Wesley Snipes was detained in South Africa at Johannesburg International Airport for allegedly trying to pass through the airport with a fake South African passport. Snipes was allowed to return home because he had a valid U.S. passport.

In early 2020, the Brazilian soccer player Ronaldinho and his brother were detained in Paraguay while allegedly trying to enter the country with fake Paraguayan passports.

=== International Law ===
==== China ====
Under the Passport Law of the People’s Republic of China (2006), obtaining a passport fraudulently is prohibited. Fraudulently obtained passports are null and void, and that "the holder of the passport shall be fined not less than RMB 2,000 yuan but not more than 5,000 yuan".

==== United States ====
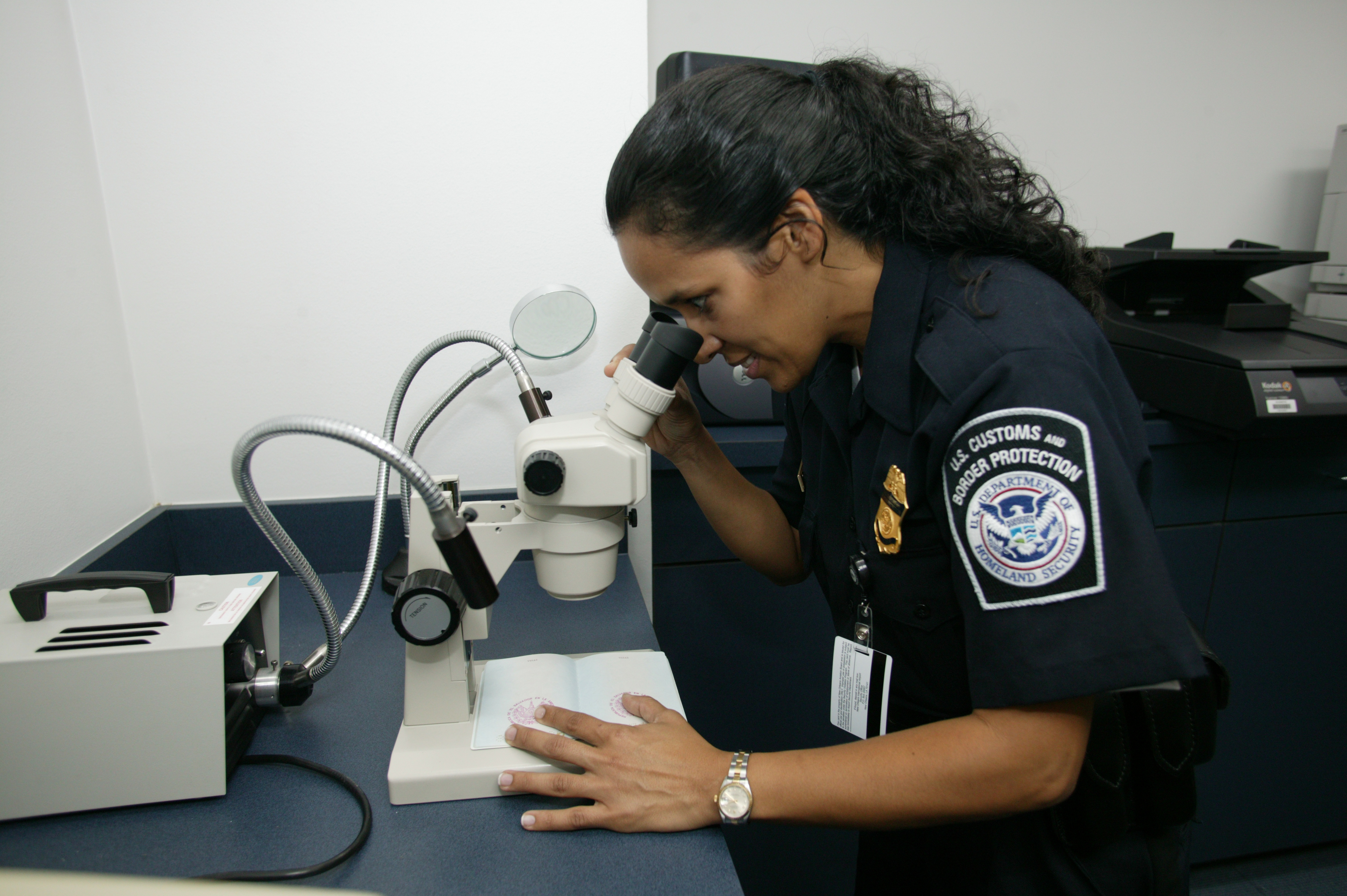
U.S. CBP OFO agent checking the authenticity of a travel document at an international airport using a stereo microscope

Passport fraud is a federal crime in the United States, often committed to facilitate another crime such as illegal immigration, contraband smuggling, economic crime, or terrorism. The US department of state's law enforcement, Diplomatic Security Service, have special agents who work with law enforcement agencies in over 160 countries all over the world to investigate passport fraud. Millions of stolen passports are used by terrorists and other dangerous criminals at any given time and it is considered the single largest threat to U.S. national security.

Convictions for passport fraud in the U.S. can result in fines up to $250,000 and prison sentences of between 10 and 20 years, depending on mitigating factors. Department of State Bureau of Diplomatic Security: Investigating Passport and Visa Fraud

== Passport issuance volumes ==
Example passport issuances
Nationality	Number of issuances in year	Latest year	Number of issuances per thousand capita
China	30,080,000	2018	21‰
United States	27,348,416	2025	80‰
France	5,400,000	2022	80‰
Canada	5,100,000	2014–2015	134‰
United Kingdom	4,008,870	2020	61‰
Brazil	2,854,312	2025	13‰
Australia	1,745,340	2019–2020	68‰
Sweden	1,478,583	2013	154‰
Ireland	1,080,000	2022	210‰
Finland	774,544	2015	141‰
Hong Kong	71,827	2019	10‰

== Passport retention ==
Forced retention or confiscation of migrant workers' passports is often associated with modern slavery. The International Labour Organization lists "withheld passports" as an indicator of worker exploitation.

== See also ==
- Animal passport
- Pet passport
- ISO/IEC 7810 defines the standard size for passport booklets.
- List of passports
- Passport card (disambiguation)
- Internal passport – Document issued to control domestic travel and internal migration
- Passport stamp
- Identity document forgery
- Self-sovereign identity
- Charles Stopford
