= Jersey-variant British passport =

Type of passport issued in Jersey

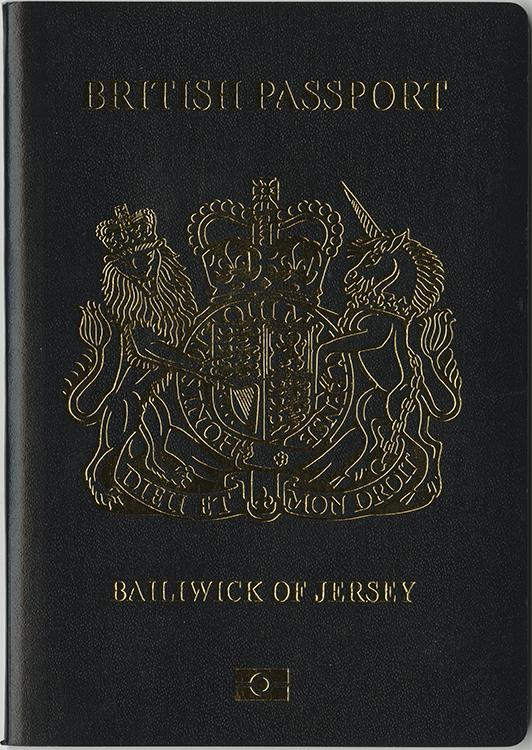
- The front cover of a Series C Jersey-variant British biometric passport.
- Type: Passport
- Issued by: Lieutenant Governor of Jersey, on behalf of Charles III of the United Kingdom (on the advice of the Lord Chancellor being also British Secretary of State for Justice), at the request of the States of Jersey
- Eligibility: British citizenship

The Jersey-variant British passport is a type of British passport issued in the British Crown dependency of Jersey by the Passport Office in St Helier.

Jersey-variant British passports are full British passports and are simply an alternative design used by the Jersey passport authorities to distinguish passports issued by the island. As such, they can theoretically be issued to any British citizens. However, in practice they are only issued to British citizens connected to Jersey.

== Eligibility ==
The Passport Office of the Jersey Government issues British passports only to British citizens living in the Channel Islands, the United Kingdom or the Isle of Man who have a connection to Jersey—e.g. were born, or live in Jersey or are a child born outside Jersey to parents born in Jersey.

Applicants cannot be physically abroad at the time of application.

== Endorsements ==
Jersey-variant British passports before 2020 may have an observation included to the following effect:

The holder is not entitled to benefit from European Community Provisions relating to employment or establishment

Under Protocol 3 of the UK's EU accession treaty, some British citizens connected to Jersey had Channel Islander status. Channel Islanders were not able to benefit from free movement rights (of people and services) in the EU outside the UK (they could in Ireland due to Common Travel Area rights).

A Channel Islander was everyone who was a British citizen only because they, their parent or their grandparent was born, adopted, naturalised or registered in Jersey. It did not include British citizens who had a parent or grandparent who was born, adopted, naturalised or registered as a British citizen in the UK. Channel Islanders would lose their status if they lived in the UK for five years. Immigrants to Jersey, including EEA nationals who otherwise had EU citizenship, who naturalised or registered as British citizens in Jersey, as well as anyone who gets British citizenship from them by descent, also had Channel Islander status.

After Brexit, no British citizens were able to exercise freedom of movement rights, so Channel Islander status and the associated passport observation ceased to be used from 1 January 2021.

== Design ==
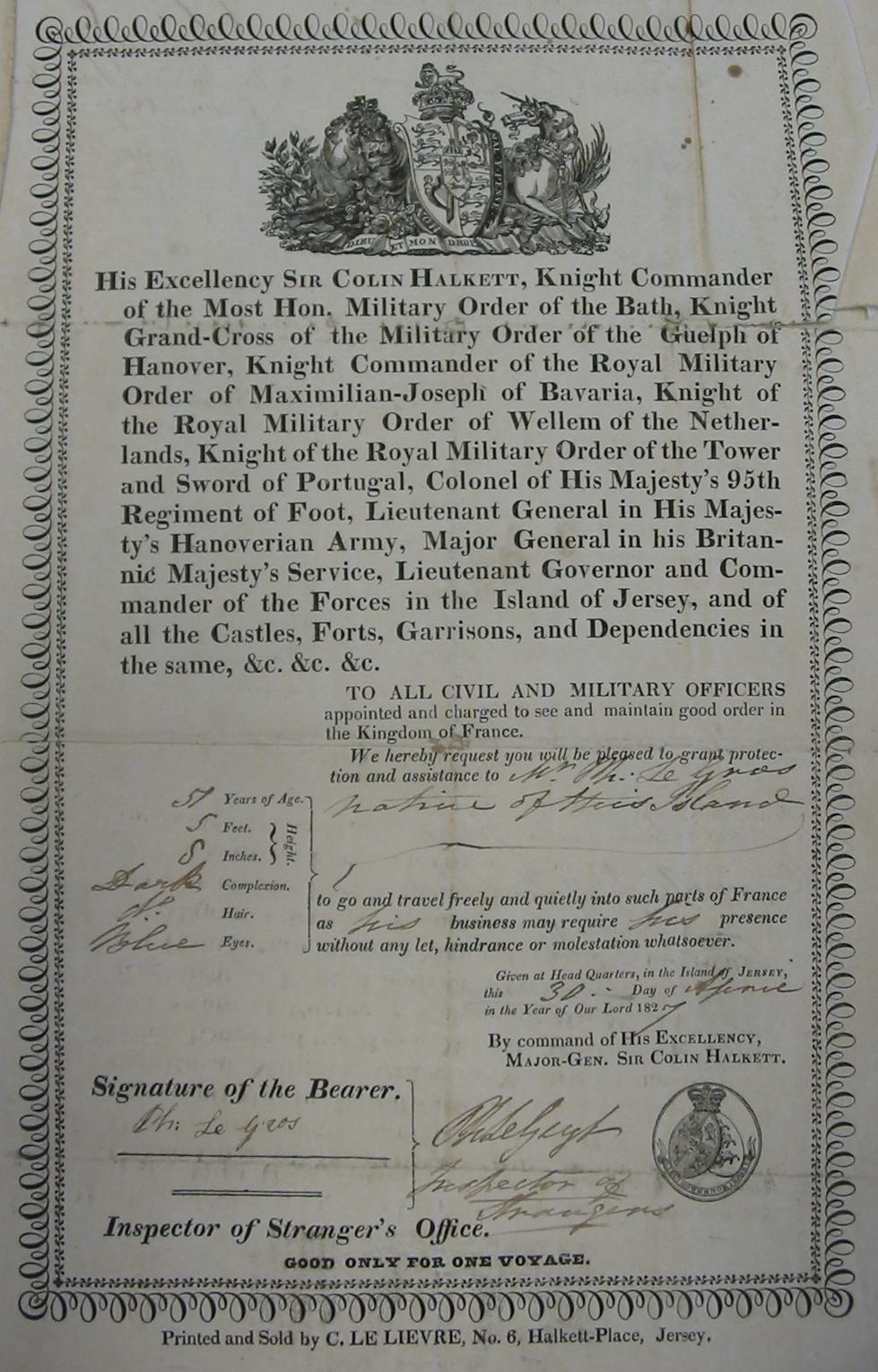
1827 Jersey-variant British passport

The design generally follows that of other British passports; however, like many other British territories and dependencies with separate passport offices, it replaces the text "United Kingdom" with other text.

Current issue British passports are navy blue, as are Jersey-variant passports.

The blue passport sports the Royal coat of arms emblazoned in the centre of the front cover. "BRITISH PASSPORT" is inscribed above the coat of arms and "BAILIWICK OF JERSEY" inscribed below. The biometric passport symbol appears at the bottom of the front cover. The rear cover of blue passports are also embossed with the floral emblems of England (Tudor rose), Northern Ireland (Shamrock), Scotland (Scottish thistle) and Wales (daffodil).

Jersey passports contain on their inside cover the following words in English only:

His Britannic Majesty's Lieutenant Governor and Commander-in-Chief of Jersey (Channel Islands) and its dependencies requests and requires in the Name of His Majesty all those whom it may concern to allow the bearer to pass freely without let or hindrance and to afford such assistance and protection as may be necessary.

Prior to 1988, all Jersey-variant British passports were navy blue, like the other British passports. Between 1988 and 2020, they were burgundy and endorsed with the words "EUROPEAN UNION BRITISH ISLANDS". British Islands refers to the collective territory of the United Kingdom and Crown dependencies.

Passports issued after the reign Queen Elizabeth II ended read "His Majesty", whereas passports issued during Elizabeth II's reign read "Her Majesty".
