= Isle of Man-variant British passport =

British passport variant

Isle of Man passport
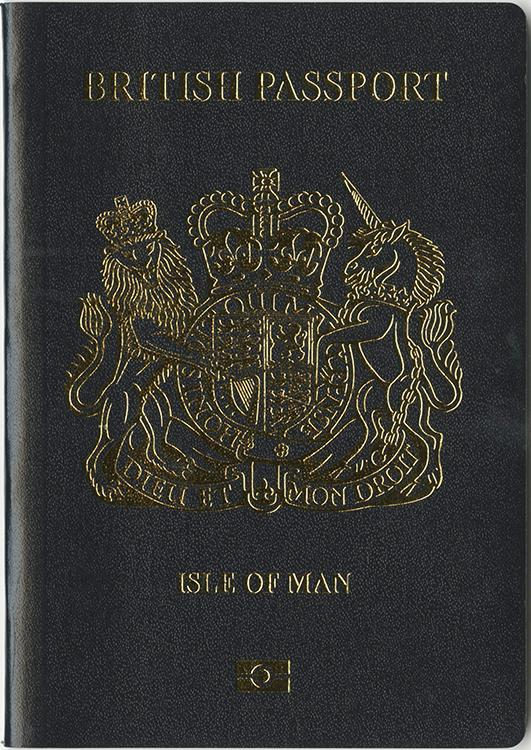
- The front cover of a Series C Manx biometric passport
- Type: Passport
- Issued by: Lieutenant Governor of the Isle of Man, on behalf of Charles III of the United Kingdom (on the advice of the Lord Chancellor being also British Secretary of State for Justice), at the request of the Isle of Man Government
- Eligibility: See below

The Isle of Man-variant British passport, also known as the Manx passport, is a type of British passport issued by the Lieutenant Governor of the Isle of Man, one of the Crown Dependencies associated with the United Kingdom, on behalf of the British sovereign under the Royal Prerogative, at the request of the Isle of Man Government, to British citizens and certain British subjects (only for those with the right of abode in the United Kingdom) resident in the Isle of Man, or who have certain qualifying important connections to the Isle of Man but are currently resident in the United Kingdom.

British passports pursuant to applications received in, from or through the Isle of Man are printed centrally by HM Passport Office of the Home Office in the United Kingdom, and are dispatched by post directly from one of their printing centres to applicants.

== Appearance ==
British passports issued for the Isle of Man are slightly different from regular United Kingdom passports. Passports printed from 5 April 2019 do not include the words 'European Union' on the front cover. The Isle of Man transitioned to issuing the new blue-covered passports in 2020.

Because the Isle of Man is not part of the United Kingdom, its passports do not carry the words United Kingdom of Great Britain and Northern Ireland on the front cover, nor on the biodata page. In their place, they have the words Isle of Man on the front cover and British Islands - Isle of Man on the biodata page.

Unusually, the words European Union and Isle of Man previously appeared together on Isle of Man British citizen passports, even though the territory of the Isle of Man was not part of the European Union. This is because the bearer was perhaps a full British and European Union citizen, although an endorsement may have applied in the case of some citizens.

The request inside the passport's front cover "to allow the bearer to pass freely" and to give "such assistance and protection as may be necessary" is made by the Lieutenant Governor of the Isle of Man. In United Kingdom passports, this request is issued in the name of "His Britannic Majesty's Secretary of State".
The request inside the passport's front cover reads:

His Britannic Majesty's
Lieutenant Governor of the
Isle of Man requests and requires
in the name of His Majesty
all those whom it may concern to
allow the bearer to pass freely
without let or hindrance,
and to afford the bearer
such assistance and protection
as may be necessary.

The illustration shows the Royal coat of arms of the United Kingdom, instead of The Arms of His Majesty in Right of the Isle of Man. The biometric passport symbol appears at the bottom of the front cover.
The rear cover of the passport, as well as every page except for the identity information page, is embossed with the floral emblems of England (Tudor rose), Northern Ireland (Shamrock), Scotland (Scottish thistle) and Wales (daffodil).

The passport contains 34 pages, excluding the inside covers at the front and the back.

=== Identity information page ===
The Manx passport includes the following data:

- Photo of passport Holder
- Type (P)
- Code (GBR)
- Passport No.
- Surname (1)
- Given names (2)
- Nationality (3)
- Date of birth (4)
- Sex (5)
- Place of birth (6)
- Date of issue (7)
- Authority (8)
- Date of expiry (9)
- Holder's signature (10)
- Observations page (11)
- Machine-readable zone starting with P<GBR

== Administration ==
=== Application process ===
HM Passport Office of the British Home Office is responsible for administering the scheme. Until 2026, the scheme was administered only using paper applications. In 2026, an online application process was introduced.

=== Eligibility ===
HM Passport Office allows the Isle of Man Government to accept and process applications for the Isle of Man variant of the British passport from:

- British citizens or British subjects with the right of abode in the United Kingdom living in the Isle of Man
- British citizens born in the Isle of Man but resident in the UK
- Naturalised / Registered in the Isle of Man but resident in the UK
- Naturalised / Registered in the UK and living in the Isle of Man

== Endorsements ==
Prior to the UK's withdrawal from the European Union, some passports issued by the Isle of Man Government had an endorsement included to the following effect:

holder is not entitled to benefit from European Community Provisions relating to employment or establishment

This appeared when a British citizen passport holder was born or naturalised in either the Isle of Man or the Channel Islands and had no connection through residency (defined as five consecutive years) or descent (a UK-born parent or grandparent) to the United Kingdom. This endorsement results from Protocol 3 to the UK's Act of Accession to the European Community, which defined the relationship between the Isle of Man and what became the European Union. The Protocol defined the term "Manxman" specifically to mean a person connected by birth or naturalisation with the Isle of Man who has no connection to the UK, which is different from the term's usual, wider meaning. The Protocol meant that those defined as Manxmen did not have a direct right to live and work freely in EU member states other than the UK, where they have a right to live and work freely under UK domestic law in common with other British citizens.

== Previous designs ==
Prior to 2020, the passports, in common with other British passports, were red and adorned with the words European Union.

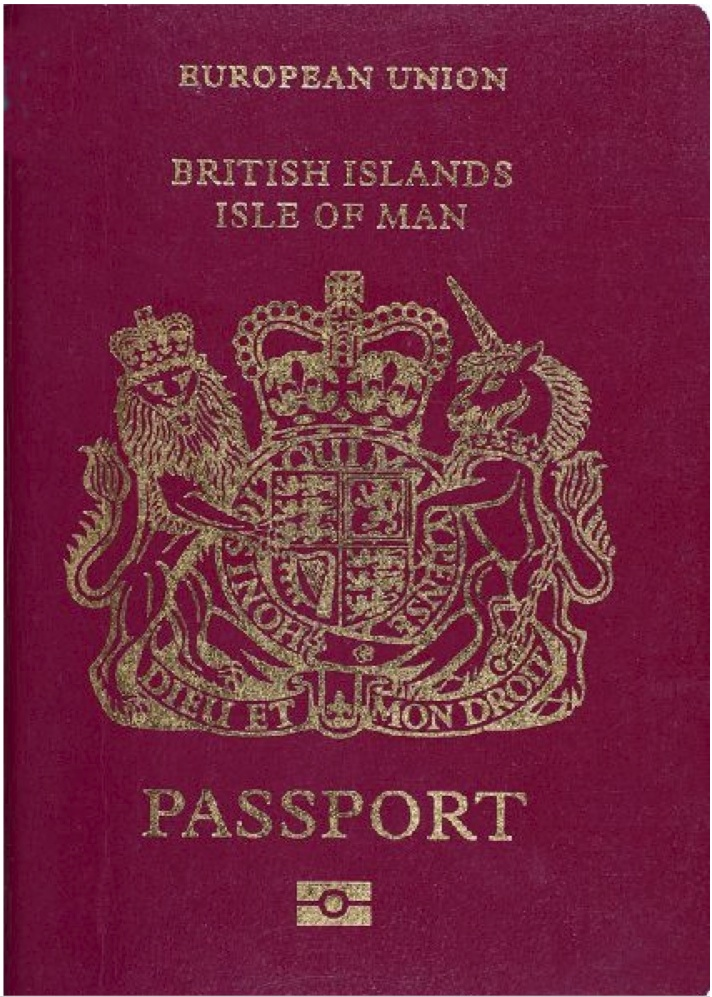
