= Guernsey-variant British passport =

British passport variant

Guernsey passport
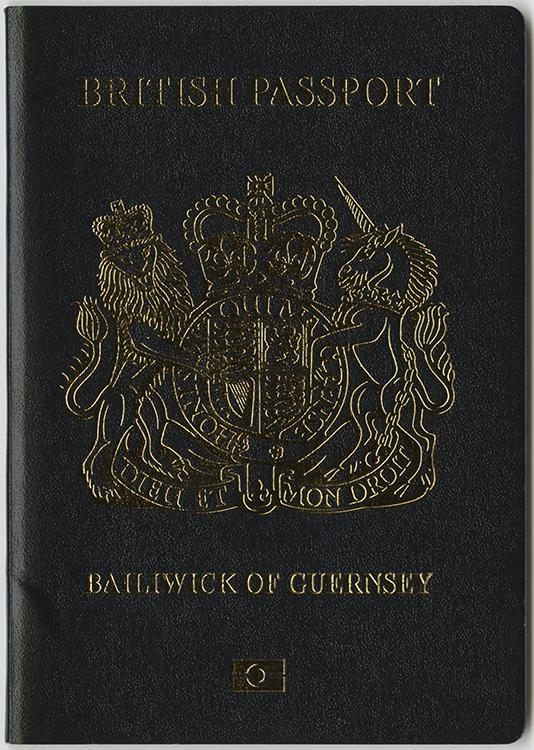
- The front cover of a Series C Guernsey biometric passport.
- Type: Passport
- Issued by: Lieutenant Governor of Guernsey, on behalf of Charles III of the United Kingdom (on the advice of the Lord Chancellor being also British Secretary of State for Justice), at the request of the States of Guernsey
- Eligibility: British citizenship

A Guernsey-variant British passport, also known as the Guernsey Passport, is a British passport issued to British citizens who are in the Bailiwick of Guernsey by the Passport Office of the Customs and Immigration Department in St Peter Port, Guernsey.

== Eligibility ==
The Guernsey Customs and Immigration Department issues British passports to British citizens who are in Guernsey at the time of application and will be there when the passport is issued. Application forms are available from the Passport Office at White Rock, the States Office in Alderney, or the Greffe in Sark.

== Passport statement ==
Guernsey passports contain on their inside cover the following words in English only:

His Britannic Majesty's Lieutenant Governor and Commander-in-Chief of Guernsey (Channel Islands) and its dependencies requests and requires in the Name of His Majesty all those whom it may concern to allow the bearer to pass freely without let or hindrance and to afford such assistance and protection as may be necessary.

== Endorsements ==
Prior to the UK's withdrawal from the European Union, British passports issued by the States of Guernsey to people who are regarded as 'Channel Islanders or Manxmen' under Protocol 3 of the Treaty of Rome had an endorsement included to the following effect:

holder is not entitled to benefit from European Community Provisions relating to employment or establishment

Although British citizens who only had a connection to Guernsey were European Union citizens (an EU citizen being defined by the Treaty of Maastricht as a person holding the nationality of a Member State), they did not have EU Freedom of Movement Rights.

However, if an applicant for a Guernsey passport was regarded as "having a close connection to the United Kingdom" (i.e. they had lived in the UK for five years, were born in the UK, or had parents or grandparents born in the UK), their passports would not include such an endorsement and they would be fully eligible to benefit from European Union Freedom of Movement rights.

== Previous designs ==
Prior to the current design being brought in during 2020, in common with other British passports, the design was red and was adorned with the words "European Union".

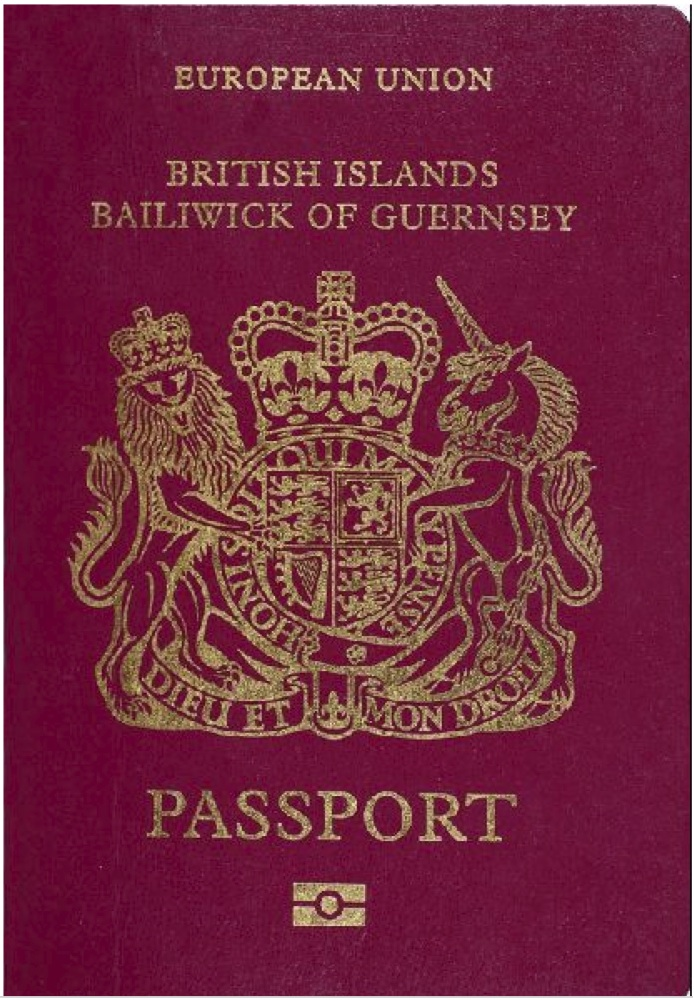
