= History of British nationality law =

This article concerns the history of British nationality law.

== Early English and British nationality law ==
British nationality law has its origins in medieval England. There has always been a distinction in English law between the subjects of the monarch and aliens: the monarch's subjects owed him allegiance, and included those born in his dominions (natural-born subjects) and those who later gave him their allegiance (naturalised subjects or denizens).

A summary of early English common law is provided by Sir William Blackstone, who wrote about the law in 1765–1769. Natural-born subjects were originally those born within the dominion of the crown (jus soli). Blackstone describes how various statutes extended the rights of the children of subjects born abroad, until "all children, born out of the king's ligeance, whose fathers were natural-born subjects, are now natural-born subjects themselves, to all intents and purposes, without any exception; unless their said fathers were attainted, or banished beyond sea, for high treason; or were then in the service of a prince at enmity with Great Britain."

In 1603 the crowns of England and Scotland were united in the individual of James VI and I, in what is known as the Union of the Crowns. In 1701, following some disagreement about the rules of succession to the crown, the English parliament passed the Alien Act 1705 (3 & 4 Ann. c. 6), providing that Scottish nationals would have alien status in the realm of England. However, this was superseded by the Act of Union 1707, which united the realms of England and Scotland.

When the British Empire came into existence, the reach of the crown expanded. British subjects included not only persons within the United Kingdom but also those throughout the British Empire. This included both the more dependent colonies such as Jamaica, Hong Kong and Fiji, as well as the self-governing colonies and dominions, including the Australian colonies, New Zealand, South Africa, Canada and Newfoundland.

Individuals born in the dominion were citizens regardless of the status of their parents: children born to visitors or foreigners acquired citizenship (see Jus soli). This reflects the rationale of natural-born citizenship: that citizenship was acquired because British-born subjects would have a 'natural allegiance' to the Crown as a 'debt of gratitude' to the Crown for protecting them through infancy. Therefore, citizenship by birth was perpetual and could not be, at common law, removed or revoked regardless of residency.

By the same reasoning, an 'alien', or foreign-born resident, was seen as unable to revoke their relationship with their place of birth. Therefore, at English common law foreign-born individuals could not become citizens through any procedure or ceremony. Some exceptions to this general principle existed in the common law, to recognise the situation of children born on foreign soil to English (or British after the Act of Union 1707) subjects. The earliest exception was the children of the king's ambassadors, who became subjects of the king even if not born in England. A later, broader, exception was enacted by the Status of Children Born Abroad Act 1350 (25 Edw. 3. Stat. 1) to allow children born abroad to two parents who were subjects to be subjects (extended to Scots born after the union of the crowns by Calvin's Case). Later, the British Nationality Act 1772 (13 Geo. 3. c. 21) made general provision allowing natural-born allegiance (citizenship) to be assumed if the father alone were British.

Generally then, there was no process by which a 'foreigner' not of British parents could become a British citizen. However, two procedures existed by which the individual could become a British subject with some of the rights of citizenship. Firstly, 'naturalisation' granted all the legal rights of citizenship and required an act of parliament be passed. Alternatively, denization allowed a person to gain the rights of citizenship other than political rights. Denization was granted by letters patent, and was granted by the monarch as an exercise of royal prerogative.

Denization was therefore an exercise of executive power, whereas naturalisation was an exercise of legislative power. An example of the latter is the granting of English nationality to the Electress Sophia of Hanover, the heir to the throne under the Act of Settlement 1701 (12 & 13 Will. 3. c. 2). Naturalisation occurred by the passing of the Sophia Naturalization Act 1705 (4 & 5 Ann. c. 16). This act granted English nationality to the electress and to the Protestant "issue of her body", allowing all her future descendants a claim to English nationality. In 1957 Prince Ernest Augustus of Hanover successfully claimed citizenship of the UK and Colonies under this act. Although the act was repealed from 1 January 1949 by the British Nationality Act 1948, some descendants can still claim citizenship based on their parent's rights under the law as it existed prior to 1949. However, the Home Office believes that the act does not generally give claimants a right of abode in the United Kingdom. Successful claims will normally be granted to only those with British Overseas Citizen status unless entitled to a right of abode in the UK under the Immigration Act 1971 (c. 77) as in force prior to 1983.

Denization remained the usual form by which foreign-born subjects swore allegiance to the Crown until general naturalisation acts were passed. Naturalisation Acts were passed in 1844, 1847 and 1870. The Naturalization Act 1870 (33 & 34 Vict. c. 14) preserved the process of denization. However, by introducing administrative procedures for naturalising non-British subjects naturalisation became the preferred process.

The Naturalization Act 1870 also introduced the concept of renunciation of British nationality, and provided for the first time that British women who married foreign men should lose their British nationality. This was a radical break from the common law doctrine that citizenship could not be removed, renounced, or revoked.

The loss of nationality at marriage was changed with the adoption of the British Nationality and Status of Aliens Act 1914 (4 & 5 Geo. 5. c. 17). This codified for the first time the law relating to British nationality. However, it did not mark a major change in the substantive content of the law. This was to wait until 1948.

== British Nationality and Status of Aliens Act 1914 ==
The British Nationality and Status of Aliens Act 1914 (4 & 5 Geo. 5. c. 17) came into force on 1 January 1915. British subject status was acquired as follows:

- birth within His Majesty's dominions
- naturalisation in the United Kingdom or a part of His Majesty's dominions which had adopted Imperial naturalisation criteria
- descent through the legitimate male line (child born outside His Majesty's dominions to a British subject father). This was limited to one generation although further legislation in 1922 allowed subsequent generations born overseas to be registered as British subjects within one year of birth.
- foreign women who married British subject men
- former British subjects who had lost British subject status on marriage or through a parent's loss of status could resume it in specific circumstances (e.g. if a woman became widowed, or children immediately upon turning 21).

British subject status was normally lost by:

- naturalisation in a foreign state
- in the case of a woman, upon marriage to a foreign man. Prior to 1933, British subject status was lost even if the woman did not acquire her husband's nationality.
- a child of a father who lost British subject status, provided the child also had the father's new nationality.
- renunciation.

== British Nationality Act 1948 ==
The Commonwealth Heads of Government decided in 1948 to embark on a major change in the law of nationality throughout the Commonwealth, following Canada's decision to enact its own citizenship law in 1946. Until then all Commonwealth countries, with the exception of the Irish Free State (see Irish nationality law), had a single nationality status: British subject status. It was decided at that conference that the United Kingdom and the self-governing dominions would each adopt separate national citizenships, but retain the common status of British subject.

The British Nationality Act 1948 (11 & 12 Geo. 6. c. 56) marked the first time that married British women gained independent nationality, regardless of the citizenship of their spouses. It provided for a new status of Citizen of the United Kingdom and Colonies (CUKC), consisting of all those British subjects who had a close relationship (either through birth or descent) with the United Kingdom and its remaining colonies. Each other Commonwealth country did likewise, and also established its own citizenship (with the exception of Newfoundland which became part of Canada on 31 March 1949, Newfoundlanders hence becoming Canadian citizens).

The Act also provided that British subjects could be known by the alternative title Commonwealth citizen.

It was originally envisaged that all British subjects would get one (or more) of the national citizenships being drawn up under the Act, and that the remainder would be absorbed as CUKCs by the British Government. Until they acquired one or other of the national citizenships, these people continued to be British subjects without citizenship. However, some British subjects never became citizens of any Commonwealth country.

Because the nationality laws of India and Pakistan did not provide for citizenship for everyone who was born in their countries, the British Government refused to "declare" their nationality laws for the purposes of the Act, and therefore those British subjects from these countries who did not become Indian or Pakistani citizens were never absorbed as CUKCs by the British Government. They remained British subjects without citizenship.

Due to the imminent withdrawal of the Republic of Ireland from the Commonwealth (which took effect 18 April 1949), special arrangements were made in s.2 of the Act to allow British subjects from Ireland to apply to continue to hold British subject status independently of the citizenship of any Commonwealth country.

Until 1983 the status of British subjects without citizenship was not affected by the acquisition of the citizenship of a non-Commonwealth country.

=== Acquisition of Citizenship of the UK and Colonies ===
Under the 1948 Act, CUKC status was acquired by:

- birth in the UK or a colony (which does not include birth in the Dominions or children of 'enemy aliens' and diplomats). The immigration status of the parents was irrelevant.
- naturalisation or registration in the UK or a colony or protectorate
- legitimate descent from a CUKC father for children born elsewhere. Only the first generation acquired British nationality automatically. Second and subsequent generations could do so only if born outside the Commonwealth (or Ireland) and registered within 12 months of birth or if the father was in Crown Service.
- incorporation of territory (no persons ever acquired CUKC this way from 1949)
- declaration
- marriage

Provisions for acquisition of CUKC by adoption were not included in the 1948 Act itself but were added soon after.

==== Requirements for Naturalisation or Registration ====
Citizens of Commonwealth countries, British subjects and Irish citizens were entitled to register as citizens of the UK and Colonies after one year's residence in the UK & Colonies. This period was increased to five years in 1973.

Other persons were required to apply for naturalisation after five years residence.

==== Citizenship by Descent ====
Prior to 1983, as a general rule, British nationality could be transmitted from only the father, and parents were required to be married.

Children born in Commonwealth countries or the Republic of Ireland could not normally access British nationality if the father was British by descent.

Those born in non-Commonwealth countries of second and subsequent generations born overseas could be registered as British within 12 months of birth. However, many such children did not acquire a Right of Abode in the UK before 1983 and hence became British Overseas citizens in 1983 rather than British citizens.

In the face of various concerns over gender equality, human rights, and treaty obligations, Parliament moved to act on these situations.

On 8 February 1979 the Home Office announced that overseas-born children of British mothers would generally be eligible for registration as UK citizens provided application was made before the child reached age 18. Many eligible children were not registered before their 18th birthday due to the fact this policy concession was poorly publicised. Hence it was effectively reintroduced by the Nationality, Immigration and Asylum Act 2002 for those aged under 18 on the date of the original announcement, with the law adding a new section 4C to the British Nationality Act 1981.

The Borders, Citizenship and Immigration Act 2009 then expanded the earliest date of birth covered from 1961 to 1 January 1949, and elaborated in "a dense and at times impenetrable piece of drafting" on the section's approach, while also covering numerous additional and less common situations, and adding a good character requirement.

Registration through this method is performed with Form UKM. After approval, the registrant must attend a citizenship ceremony. Since 2010, there is no longer an application fee (of £540). Applicants do however still have to pay £80 for the citizenship ceremony.

From 6 April 2015, a child born out of wedlock before 1 July 2006 to a British father is entitled to register as a British citizen by descent under the Immigration Act 2014 using form UKF. Such child must also meet character requirements, pay relevant processing fees and attend a citizenship ceremony. However, if the applicant has a claim to register as a British citizen under other clauses of the British Nationality Act 1981, or has already acquired British citizenship after being legitimised, the application will be refused.

Those with permanent resident status in the UK, or entitled to Right of Abode, may instead prefer to seek naturalisation as a British citizen which gives transmissible British citizenship otherwise than by descent.

==== Citizenship by Declaration ====
A person who was a British Subject on 31 December 1948, of United Kingdom & Colonies descent in the male line, and was resident in the UK & Colonies (or intending to be so resident) was entitled to acquire CUKC by declaration under s12(6) of the Act. The deadline for this was originally 31 December 1949, but was extended to 31 December 1962 by the British Nationality Act 1958.

==== Citizenship by Marriage ====
Women married to CUKCs had the right to register as CUKCs under section 6(2) of the 1948 Act.

==== Citizenship by Adoption ====
Before 1950 there was generally no provision to acquire British citizenship by adoption:

- between 1 January 1950 and 31 December 1982, a person adopted in the UK by a citizen of the UK & Colonies (CUKC) acquired CUKC automatically if the adopter, or in the case of a joint adoption, the male adopter, was a CUKC.
- children adopted in the Channel Islands and Isle of Man on or after 1 April 1959 acquired CUKC on the same basis as adoptees in the UK on 16 July 1964, or the date of the adoption order, if later.

In general a person acquiring CUKC by virtue of adoption in the UK, Channel Islands or Isle of Man, became a British citizen on 1 January 1983.

== Ireland Act 1949 ==
The Ireland Act 1949 clarified the citizenship status of the British subjects and citizens and former subjects on the Republic of Ireland, and the application of the British Nationality Act 1948 to people born there.

In addition, under section 5 of the act, a person who was born in the territory of the future Republic of Ireland as a British subject, but who did not receive Irish citizenship under the Ireland Act's interpretation of either the 1922 Irish constitution or the 1935 Irish Nationality and Citizenship Act (because he or she was no longer domiciled in the Republic on the day the constitution came into force and was not permanently resident there on the day of the 1935 law's enactment and was not otherwise registered as an Irish citizen) was deemed to be a Citizen of the United Kingdom and Colonies.

As such, the act has important implications for many of those emigrants who left Ireland before 1922 and some of their descendants in the Irish diaspora, some of whom may both be registrable for Irish citizenship and have a claim to British citizenship, through either automatic citizenship or citizenship by registration. In some cases, their descendants may have a claim to British citizenship when the right to Irish citizenship has been lost because of the failure of previous generations to register births at the local Irish consulate.

== Independence Acts ==
Many colonies became independent between 1949 and 1983. Under the independence legislation passed in the United Kingdom, a person connected with a particular colony generally lost CUKC on a specified date (which was normally that particular colony's date of attaining independence) if:

- they had acquired, or would acquire, citizenship of that country upon or after independence; and
- they did not have specified bloodline connections to the UK itself or a place which remained a colony (e.g., having a parent or a grandparent born in the UK or a place that remained a colony)

Therefore, it was possible for CUKCs to lose the status even if they had migrated to the UK and acquired the right of abode. Only through naturalisation or registration could they regain CUKC (and the right of abode in some cases).

Specific exceptions to the loss of CUKC on independence included:

- persons from the Malayan states of Penang and Malacca who, because of the wording of Federation of Malaya Independence Act 1957, did not lose CUKC at independence on 31 August 1957, as the law only provided for "the Malay States" for nationality purposes, whereas Penang and Malacca, at the time, were parts of the Straits Settlement. These persons, together with those born between 31 August 1957 and 31 December 1982 with a CUKC father, form the largest group of British Overseas citizens today. Most also hold Malaysian citizenship.
- CUKCs connected with South Yemen normally lost their CUKC status on 14 August 1968. However, those ordinarily residing in the UK, a colony or another protectorate on or before that date were exempted from the loss.
- CUKCs from Cyprus retained CUKC if habitually resident elsewhere in the Commonwealth (except Cyprus) immediately before 16 August 1960. These people would become British Overseas Citizens after 1983 if they did not acquire the right of abode.
- In 1981 the Independence Acts dealing with Belize and Antigua/Barbuda exempted persons who had acquired a Right of abode in the UK from loss of CUKC. Such persons would have become British citizens in 1983 due to their Right of abode status.

The only British dependent territory that gained independence after 1982 is Saint Kitts and Nevis, which became an independent Commonwealth country on 19 September 1983. British Dependent Territories citizenship was withdrawn unless there was a connection with a remaining dependent territory. Those that had acquired British citizenship before independence and became also Saint Kitts and Nevis citizens upon independence, however, would no longer lose their British citizenship.

In some cases (Singapore and the Federation of Malaya), citizenship statuses were created before independence was achieved. This resulted in unusual endorsements like "British subject: citizen of the State of Singapore" in British passports. Indeed, treaties signed by the United Kingdom around this time reveal the existence of at least the following citizenship statuses:

- British Subject
- British Subject, Citizen of the United Kingdom and Colonies
- British Subject, Citizen of the United Kingdom, Islands and Colonies
- British Subject, Citizen of the United Kingdom, Associated States and Colonies
- British Subject, Citizen of the State of Singapore
- British Subject, Citizen of the Federation of Rhodesia and Nyasaland

== British Nationality Acts of 1958, 1964 and 1965 ==
British Nationality Acts were passed in 1958, 1964 (twice) and 1965:

- The British Nationality Act 1958 (6 & 7 Eliz. 2. c. 10) legislation dealt with Rhodesia, Ghana independence and reinstating temporarily some lapsed transitional registration entitlements
- The British Nationality Act 1964 (c. 22) provided for resumption of CUKC where it was renounced to obtain another Commonwealth citizenship. It was no longer possible for a renunciation of CUKC to take effect if the person did not have another nationality.
- The British Nationality (No. 2) Act 1964 (c. 54) provided for British mothers to transmit CUKC status in cases of statelessness of an overseas born child. It also repealed section 20(4) of the 1948 legislation which allowed naturalised CUKCs resident for more than seven years outside the UK & Colonies to be deprived of CUKC in certain circumstances.
- The British Nationality Act 1965 (c. 34) made provision for women married to British subjects without citizenship to acquire British subject status by registration

== Commonwealth Immigrants Acts ==
Until the Commonwealth Immigrants Act 1962, all Commonwealth citizens could enter and stay in the United Kingdom without any restriction. The Commonwealth Immigrants Act 1962 made Citizens of the United Kingdom and Colonies (CUKCs) whose passports were not directly issued by the United Kingdom Government (i.e. passports issued by the Governor of a colony or by the Commander of a British protectorate) subject to immigration control. Those with passports issued at a British High Commission in an independent Commonwealth country or British Consulate remained free from immigration control.

The 1962 Act also increased the residence period for Commonwealth citizens (plus British subjects and Irish citizens) applying for registration as Citizens of the UK and Colonies from one year to five years.

The Commonwealth Immigrants Act 1968 sharpened the distinction between citizens of the United Kingdom and Colonies (CUKCs) who had close ties with the United Kingdom and were free to enter, and those citizens who had no such ties and were therefore subject to immigration control. Particularly in the newly independent Commonwealth countries of East Africa, the result was that there were now citizens of the United Kingdom and Colonies who had no right of residence anywhere.

== Immigration Act 1971 ==
The Immigration Act 1971 developed this distinction by creating the concept of patriality or right of abode. CUKCs and other Commonwealth citizens had the right of abode in the UK only if they, their husband (if female), their parents, or their grandparents were connected to the United Kingdom and Islands (the UK, the Channel Islands and the Isle of Man). This placed the UK in the rare position of denying some of its nationals entry into their country of nationality. (One consequence of this has been the inability of the United Kingdom to ratify the Fourth Protocol to the European Convention on Human Rights, which guarantees the right of abode for nationals, a right which is widely recognised in international law.)

Prior to 1983. the following people had the right of abode under the Act:

- A citizen of the United Kingdom and Colonies who was born, adopted, naturalised or registered in the United Kingdom.
- A citizen of the United Kingdom and Colonies who was born to, or legally adopted by, a parent who, at the time of the birth or adoption, was a citizen of the United Kingdom and Colonies born, adopted, naturalised or registered in the United Kingdom.
- A citizen of the United Kingdom and Colonies who was born to, or legally adopted by, a parent who, at the time of the birth, was a citizen of the United Kingdom and Colonies. That parent must have a parent who was a citizen of the United Kingdom and Colonies by birth, adoption, naturalisation or registration in the United Kingdom.
- A citizen of the United Kingdom and Colonies who by 1 January 1983 had been ordinarily resident in the United Kingdom for five years or more (all conditions of stay must have been removed prior to the end of the 5-year period).
- A Commonwealth citizen who was born to, or legally adopted by, a parent who, at the time of the birth or adoption, was a citizen of the United Kingdom and Colonies by birth in the United Kingdom.
- A female Commonwealth citizen or citizen of the United Kingdom and Colonies who was, or had been, the wife of a man with the right of abode.
- A citizen of the United Kingdom and Colonies who was registered in an independent Commonwealth country by the British High Commissioner.

The Act did not specifically mention the status of former CUKCs who were holding right of abode in the UK and who lost their CUKC status solely because their own country's independence, although it was implied that if the person had no claim to right of abode as a Commonwealth citizen, then these persons would no longer have right of abode unless they have reacquired their CUKC status.

The following people did not have the right of abode simply by virtue of registration as a CUKC (but could hold it through United Kingdom descent or residence, or if a woman, marriage to a man with Right of Abode):

- A woman who was registered under section 6(2) of the British Nationality Act 1948 on or after 28 October 1971, unless she got married before that date and her husband has the right of abode.
- A minor child who was registered under section 7 of the British Nationality Act 1948 in an independent Commonwealth country by the British High Commissioner on or after 28 October 1971.

The reason for these limitations is that under the 1948 Act, High Commissioners in independent Commonwealth nations had the right to register persons as CUKC. This was treated for the purpose of the 1971 Act as "registration in the United Kingdom" and hence without the special limitations on Right of Abode, that status would have been held by some CUKCs with no other qualifying ties to the United Kingdom.

The most notable group over whom control was sought were the Ugandan Indians who were expelled from Uganda by Idi Amin in 1972. As CUKCs who had passports issued by a British High Commissioner they were arriving in the United Kingdom in large numbers. A number of 'resettlement' options were looked at, including settling Indians on a suitable island in the dependent territories such as the Falkland Islands or Solomon Islands. Lord Lester of Herne Hill, QC, has written a detailed paper, "East African Asians versus The United Kingdom: The Inside Story", setting out the difficulties faced by the group.

However, the concept of patriality was recognised as only a temporary solution, so the British government embarked on a major reform of the law, resulting in the British Nationality Act 1981.

== British Nationality Act 1981 ==
The British Nationality Act 1981 abolished the status of CUKC, and replaced it with three new categories of citizenship on 1 January 1983:

- British citizenship,
- British Dependent Territories citizenship (BDTC), which was renamed British Overseas Territories citizenship (BOTC) by the British Overseas Territories Act 2002 (see below) and
- British Overseas citizenship (BOC).

British Citizens are those former CUKCs who had a close relation with the United Kingdom and Islands (i.e. those who possessed right of abode under the Immigration Act 1971); BOTCs are those former CUKCs with a close relationship with one of the remaining colonies, renamed Overseas Territories; while BOCs are those former CUKCs who did not qualify for either British citizenship or British Dependent Territories citizenship.

The law distinguishes between British citizen or British Overseas Territories citizen by descent and those who hold those statuses otherwise than by descent. Citizens by descent cannot automatically pass on British nationality to a child born outside the United Kingdom or its Overseas Territories (though in some situations the child can be registered as a citizen).

British Overseas citizens cannot generally pass on British Overseas citizenship, except in limited cases to avoid statelessness or other hardship.

It is possible to hold more than one of these citizenships simultaneously. In fact, since the British Overseas Territories Act 2002 granted British citizenship to all the Overseas Territories (except the Cyprus Sovereign Base Areas), most British overseas territories citizens also hold British citizenship. Additionally, a British Overseas citizen who acquires British citizenship will not lose British Overseas citizenship, although there is generally no added benefit from retaining this status.

Those Commonwealth citizens and British subject already entitled to Right of Abode under the Immigration Act 1971 retained this status provided they did not cease to be Commonwealth citizens or British subjects after 1983. However, countries that joined the Commonwealth after 1 January 1983 are exempt from this scheme. These are South Africa, Pakistan, Namibia, Cameroon and Mozambique. Those who come to the UK under this scheme may claim state benefits if they can show that they intend to make the UK their permanent home. Commonwealth citizens who have the right of abode need to apply for a certificate of entitlement if they want to enter the UK. The certificate is a sticker which is placed inside a non-British passport. After five years living in the UK, a person who has moved to the UK under the Right of Abode can apply to naturalise as British citizen and obtain a British passport.

Following the Chagos Archipelago handover agreement, the British government is also due to introduce legislation to implement the agreement, including amending the British Nationality Act 1981 to reflect that the British Indian Ocean Territory is no longer an overseas territory following Parliament's ratification of the treaty.

=== British Subject and British Protected Person ===
The 1981 Act retained the category of British subject without citizenship as British subject. British subjects are mainly people from the Indian sub-continent and Ireland. It ended the use of the term for those British subjects who had one of the various national citizenships, though the term Commonwealth citizen continues to be used in that regard.

Persons who held British subject status based on connections with what is now the Republic of Ireland before 1949 remain entitled to resume that status if they wish.

The status of British subject under the 1981 Act cannot be transmitted to children, although the Home Secretary has discretion to register a child as a British subject. This discretion is very rarely exercised.

British subject status can be renounced, but cannot be resumed for any reason. British subjects (except those connected with Ireland) lose their British subject status automatically if they acquire any other nationality.

For further information on the present use of the term "British subject", see British subject.

The 1981 Act also retained another category, that of British protected person (BPP), which is not a form of nationality as such (BPPs were never British subjects), but a status conferred on citizens of states under British protection. It has been argued that since BPPs are not considered stateless, they must hold some form of nationality, and that nationality must be a form of British nationality.

British Protected Persons are those who had a connection with a former British Protectorate, Protected State, League of Nations mandate or United Nations trust territory. These were mainly in Asia and Africa. British Overseas Citizens, by contrast, are those who have such a relationship with former British colonies. (Protectorates, Protected States, Mandates and Trust Territories were never, legally speaking, British colonies.) A British Protected Person will lose that status upon acquiring any other nationality or citizenship.

=== British National (Overseas) ===
The Hong Kong handover resulted in yet another nationality: British National (Overseas) or BN(O). There were some 3.5 million residents of Hong Kong who held British Dependent Territories citizen (BDTC) status by virtue of their connection with Hong Kong. Another 2 million other Hong Kong residents are believed to have been eligible to apply to become BDTCs. Upon handover, they would lose this status and became solely Chinese nationals. Uncertainty about the future of Hong Kong under Chinese rule led to the United Kingdom creating a new category of nationality for which Hong Kong BDTCs could apply. Any Hong Kong BDTC who wished to do so was able to acquire the (non-transmissible) status of British National (Overseas).

=== British Citizenship Legislation for Hong Kong ===
The handover of Hong Kong also resulted in:

- the British Nationality (Hong Kong) Act 1990 and the associated British Nationality Selection Scheme; and
- the Hong Kong (War Wives and Widows) Act 1996 which gave certain women in Hong Kong the right to register as British citizens based on their husband's or former husband's war service in defence of Hong Kong during the Second World War; and
- the British Nationality (Hong Kong) Act 1997 which gave non-Chinese ethnic minorities in Hong Kong access to British citizenship

In February 2006, British authorities announced that 600 British citizenship applications of ethnic minority children of Indian descent from Hong Kong were wrongly refused. The applications dated from the period July 1997 onwards. Where the applicant in such cases confirms that he or she still wishes to receive British citizenship the decision will be reconsidered on request. No additional fee will be payable by the applicant in such cases.

Recent changes to India's Citizenship Act 1955 provide that Indian citizenship by descent can no longer be acquired automatically at the time of birth. This amendment will also allow some children of Indian origin born in Hong Kong after 3 December 2004 who have a British National (Overseas) or British Overseas citizen parent to automatically acquire British Overseas citizenship at birth under the provisions for reducing statelessness in article 6(2) or 6(3) of the Hong Kong (British Nationality) Order 1986. If they have acquired no other nationality after birth, they will be entitled to register for full British citizenship with right of abode in the UK.

== British Overseas Territories Act 2002 ==
The British Overseas Territories Act 2002 changes the British Dependent Territories to British Overseas Territories, and British Dependent Territories Citizenship to British Overseas Territories Citizenship. This change is supposed to reflect the no longer "dependent" status of these territories, but may create confusion due to the close similarity between the terms "British Overseas Citizen" and "British Overseas Territories Citizen".

The Act also extends British citizenship to all British Overseas Territories Citizens the right to register as British Citizens, and thus acquire the right of abode, except those whose connection is solely with the military outposts known as the Sovereign Base Areas in Cyprus.

A distinction of terminology is made between British Overseas Territories Citizens born before 1 January 1983, introduction of British Dependent Territories, Citizenship, who would previously have been Citizens of the United Kingdom and Colonies, and those born after, and therefore who had not ever held right to freely enter and remain in the UK before 2002 (unless they also separately qualified as British Citizens or had "right to remain" stamped into their passports, to which they were entitled after five years legal residence in the UK).

- Those persons who held British Overseas Territories citizenship (BOTC) on 21 May 2002 (except those solely connected with the Sovereign Base Areas) automatically acquired British citizenship on that date if they did not already possess it. Most people from Gibraltar and the Falkland Islands already held full British citizenship under earlier legislation, or had the right to register as British.
- Persons who acquire BOTC after 21 May 2002 and do not already have British citizenship (mainly those naturalised as BOTCs after that date) may register as British citizens if they wish under s4A of the 1981 Act.

Until their successful claim against the British Government in the High Court over their eviction from their Territory, those connected to the British Indian Ocean Territory which houses the United States military base of Diego Garcia were to be excluded as well, but are now included. The accession of the whole island of Cyprus to the European Union would possibly have made the sole exclusion of the Sovereign Base Areas untenable, as they would become the only Cypriots (as well as the only British Overseas Territories citizens) not to have the right to live and work in the United Kingdom. However, in 2004, only the Greek part of the island was admitted, and the issue has not surfaced.

== Nationality, Immigration and Asylum Act 2002 ==
This Act involved a number of significant changes to British nationality law.

=== Additional categories of eligibility for citizenship ===
The Act provided for two new categories of eligibility for British citizenship: British nationals with no other citizenship and children born overseas to certain British mothers before 1983.

Registration under both of these newer categories confers British citizenship "by descent", pursuant to section 14 of the 1981 act. Hence, eligible persons who also possess a practicable pathway to British citizenship through naturalisation or section 4 registration may prefer to apply for those instead, as they give British citizenship otherwise than by descent.

==== British nationals with no other citizenship ====
The Nationality, Immigration and Asylum Act 2002 granted British Overseas Citizens, British Subjects and British Protected Persons the right to register as British citizens if they have no other citizenship or nationality and have not after 4 July 2002 renounced, voluntarily relinquished or lost through action or inaction any citizenship or nationality. Previously such persons would have not had the right of abode in any country, and would have thus been de facto stateless. Despite strong resistance from Senior Officials at the Home Office, the then Home Secretary, David Blunkett, said on 3 July 2002 that this would "right a historic wrong" which had left stateless tens of thousands of Asian people who had worked closely with British colonial administrations. The Government of India has also issued clarifications in respect of people with these citizenships to assist with consideration of applications under the Nationality, Immigration and Asylum Act 2002.

Sanjay Shah, a British Overseas citizen passport holder, spent 13 months living in the duty-free section of Nairobi's Jomo Kenyatta International Airport, petitioning for full British citizenship. This was granted on the grounds that he had already given up his former Kenyan citizenship.

==== Overseas born children of British mothers ====
The Act also conferred a right to registration as a British citizen on persons born between 8 February 1961 (Note: I.e. the person was under 18 at the time of the 7 February 1979 policy change announcement by Home Secretary Merlyn Rees regarding the allowance for CUKC registration of children born abroad to CUKC mothers.) and 31 December 1982 who, but for the inability (at that time) of women to pass on their citizenship, would have acquired British citizenship automatically when the British Nationality Act 1981 came into force.

Through this act's addition of section 4C to the British Nationality Act 1981, a person became entitled to registration if:

- the person was born after 7 February 1961 but before 1 January 1983;
- the person was born to a mother who was a citizen of the United Kingdom and Colonies at the time and the person would have been a citizen of the United Kingdom and Colonies by descent if it had been possible for women to pass on citizenship of the United Kingdom and Colonies to their children in the same way as men could; and
- had the person been a citizen of the United Kingdom and Colonies, they would have had the right of abode in the United Kingdom under the Immigration Act 1971 and would have become a British citizen on 1 January 1983.

(This right to registration under this measure was later amended by the Borders, Citizenship and Immigration Act 2009, which moved the earliest date of birth covered from 8 February 1961 to 1 January 1949, and elaborated in "a dense and at times impenetrable piece of drafting" on the section 4C approach, while also covering numerous additional and less common situations and adding a good character requirement. In 2018, the Supreme Court of the UK held that section 4C should be interpreted broadly.)

This citizenship registration upon demand is available through the submission of form UKM.

=== Deprivation of British nationality ===
Under amendments made by the Act, British nationals can be deprived of their citizenship if the Secretary of State is satisfied they are responsible for acts seriously prejudicial to the vital interests of the United Kingdom or an Overseas Territory. This provision originally applied only to dual nationals—it was not applicable if deprivation would result in a person's statelessness. However, in July 2014 the law was amended by the Immigration Act 2014, which allowed a person to be made stateless if the Secretary of State has reasonable grounds for believing that they can acquire the nationality of another country.

Prior to this law, British nationals who acquired that status by birth or descent (as opposed to registration or naturalisation) could not be deprived of British nationality.

There is a right of appeal against a decision to deprive a person of British nationality, but since October 2025 such orders take effect immediately pending the appeal.

=== Citizenship ceremonies ===
All new applicants for British citizenship from 1 January 2004 who are aged 18 or over must attend a citizenship ceremony and take an Oath of Allegiance and a Pledge to the United Kingdom before their grant of British citizenship can take effect

- the requirement for a citizenship ceremony applies to applicants for registration as well as naturalisation
- prior to 1 January 2004, British overseas territories citizens, British Overseas citizens, British subjects and British Nationals (Overseas), as well of citizens of countries sharing the Queen as Head of State (such as Australia and Canada) were exempt from taking the oath of allegiance. This exemption was abolished.

Similar requirements are imposed on applicants for British overseas territories citizenship, with the exception that the Pledge is based on the relevant territory rather than the United Kingdom.

It is unusual for adults to acquire British Overseas citizenship or British subject status (application must be made before age 18 and is very rarely granted); however, in such a case only an Oath of Allegiance would be required.

=== English language requirements ===
From 28 July 2004, English (or Welsh or Scottish Gaelic) language requirements for naturalisation applicants were increased:

- the language competency requirement was extended to those applying for naturalisation as the spouse of a British citizen
- evidentiary requirements were increased.

=== Life in the United Kingdom test ===
From 1 November 2005, all new applicants for naturalisation as a British citizen must (unless exempted) prove they have passed the Life in the United Kingdom test.

- The test must be passed before application is made to the Home Office
- Those who pass the test do not need to provide separate evidence of language competency
- Those aged 65 or over may be able to claim exemption
- Those who attend combined citizenship and English (or Welsh) classes may be exempted from the test

Neither the language nor Life in the UK test requirements apply to those seeking registration (as opposed to naturalisation) as a British citizen.

Note that passing the test is also required for anyone wishing to remain indefinitely in the UK, whether or not they apply for citizenship. E.g., a husband or wife of a British citizen will be deported if they do not pass the test in time.

=== Children of unmarried British fathers ===
With effect from 1 July 2006, children may acquire British citizenship automatically from an unmarried British father (or a British permanent resident if the child is born in the United Kingdom). Proof of paternity must be shown.

Children born to unmarried British fathers before 1 July 2006 are not included in this provision. However they can be registered as British citizens upon application to the Home Office (if not British some other way), provided the child is aged under 18 and would have been British had the father been married to the mother. However, the agreement of the mother is needed. If the mother refuses then policy is for the home office to enquire of her reasons for refusal. If her reasons are deemed unreasonable registration may still be granted. Also, the minor can apply in their own right on reaching the age of 17.

As of 6 April 2015, a person over 18 years of age who was born out of wedlock before 1 July 2006 to a British father is entitled to register as a British citizen by descent under the Immigration Act 2014 using form UKF. Such child must also meet character requirements, pay relevant processing fees and attend a citizenship ceremony. However, if the applicant has a claim to register as a British citizen under other clauses of the British Nationality Act 1981, or has already acquired British citizenship after being legitimised, the application will be refused.

== Immigration, Asylum and Nationality Act 2006 ==
The Immigration, Asylum and Nationality Act 2006 made a number of changes to the law including:

- allowing the Secretary of State to deprive a British national of his or her nationality on the basis of it being "conducive to the public good". This is a less stringent test than the requirement of the 2002 Act and came into force on 16 June 2006.
- allowing Right of Abode to be revoked on the same basis
- introducing a good character requirements for all acquisitions of British citizenship, with the exception of section 4B registration, registration on the grounds of statelessness and cases where the applicant is under 10 years old. This came into force on 4 December 2006.

== Laws concerning immigration and naturalisation ==
- Status of Children Born Abroad Act 1350
- Sophia Naturalization Act 1705
- Jewish Naturalization Act 1753
- British Nationality Act 1772
- Aliens Act 1905
- Aliens Restriction Act 1914
- Aliens Act 1919
- Polish Resettlement Act 1947
- British Nationality Act 1948
- Commonwealth Immigrants Act 1962
- Commonwealth Immigrants Act 1968
- Immigration Act 1971
- British Nationality Act 1981
- British Nationality (Falkland Islands) Act 1983
- Immigration and Asylum Appeals Act 1993
- Asylum and Immigration Act 1996
- Immigration and Asylum Act 1999
- British Overseas Territories Act 2002
- Nationality, Immigration and Asylum Act 2002
- Asylum and Immigration (Treatment of Claimants, etc.) Act 2004
- Immigration, Asylum and Nationality Act 2006
- UK Borders Act 2007
- Borders, Citizenship and Immigration Act 2009
- Immigration Act 2014
- Immigration Act 2016
- British Nationality (Irish Citizens) Act 2024

== See also ==
- Citizen Information Project
- British nationality law and the Republic of Ireland
- British subject
- British nationality law
- Immigration to the United Kingdom
- Life in the United Kingdom test
- Multiple citizenship
