= Modern immigration to the United Kingdom =

Immigration to the United Kingdom since the independence of Ireland in 1922

Since 1945, immigration to the United Kingdom, controlled by British immigration law and to an extent by British nationality law, has been significant, in particular from the former territories of the British Empire and the member states of the EU and EFTA. Since the UK's withdrawal from the European Union, migration from countries outside the European Economic Area has dominated immigration to the UK. The British Nationality Act 1948 granted residency rights to all colonial subjects, approximately 800 million, enabling mass post-war immigration. The Commonwealth Immigrants Acts (1962, 1968) and Immigration Act 1971 rescinded these rights by introducing work vouchers and ancestral requirements that favoured those with parent or grandparent to have been born in the UK. The British Nationality Act 1981 abolished the 1948 citizenship status.

Since the United Kingdom acceded to the European Communities in the 1970s and the creation of the European Union in the early 1990s, people have migrated from member states of the European Union, exercising one of the European Union's Four Freedoms. Migration to and from Central and Eastern Europe increased since 2004, following the accession of eight Central and Eastern European states to the European Union. Following the end of the Brexit transition period on 31 December 2020 at 11 pm GMT, this freedom of movement ceased. Citizens of EEA+CH member states no longer had an automatic right to move to or reside permanently in the UK without a visa. A smaller number have come as illegal immigrants, many of which have claimed asylum.

According to the 2021–2022 United Kingdom censuses the foreign-born population was 10.7 million or 16% of the total United Kingdom, a 34% increase over the 2011 census, although the census gives no indication of their immigration status or intended length of stay. The UK uses a points-based immigration system. The UK Government can also grant settlement to foreign nationals, which confers on them indefinite leave to remain in the UK, without granting them British citizenship. Grants of settlement are made on the basis of various factors, including employment, family formation and reunification, and asylum (including to deal with backlogs of asylum cases).

Long-term net migration is estimated to have reached a record high of 944,000 in the year ending March 2023, with immigration at 1,469,000 and emigration at 525,000. According to the Office for National Statistics' provisional estimate, released November 2025, long-term net migration in the year ending June 2025 was +204,000 (consisting of non-EEA+CH nationals at +383,000, British nationals at -109,000, and EEA+CH nationals at -70,000). Total immigration was 898,000: non-EEA+CH nationals accounted for 75% of total immigration (670,000), British nationals comprised 16% (143,000), and EEA+CH nationals constituted 9% (85,000). The top three nationalities from non-EU+ countries immigrating on work-related visas were Indian, Pakistani, and Nigerian. Meanwhile, total emigration was 693,000: non-EEA+CH nationals accounted for 41% of total emigration (286,000), British nationals composed 36% (252,000), and EEA+CH nationals accounted for 22% (155,000).

== Definitions ==
According to an August 2018 publication of the House of Commons Library, several definitions for a migrant exist in the United Kingdom. A migrant can be:

- Someone whose country of birth is different to their country of residence.
- Someone whose nationality is different to their country of residence.
- Someone who changes their country of usual residence for a period of at least a year, so that the country of destination effectively becomes the country of usual residence.

== Policy ==
Major immigration legislation since 1945

- British Nationality Act 1948
- Commonwealth Immigrants Act 1962
- Commonwealth Immigrants Act 1968
- Immigration Appeals Act 1969
- Immigration Act 1971
- British Nationality Act 1981
- Carriers Liability Act 1987
- Immigration Act 1988
- Asylum and Immigration Appeals Act 1993
- Asylum and Immigration Act 1996
- Nationality, Immigration and Asylum Act 2002
- Immigration, Asylum and Nationality Act 2006
- Borders, Citizenship and Immigration Act 2009
- Immigration Act 2014

The Immigration Act 1971, section 1, provides for "rules laid down by the Secretary of State as to the practice to be followed in the administration of this Act". By August 2018, the Immigration Rules stood at almost 375,000 words, often so precise and detailed that the services of a lawyer are typically required to navigate them.

Individuals wanting to apply for British citizenship have to demonstrate their commitment by learning English, Welsh or Scottish Gaelic and by having an understanding of British history, culture and traditions. Any individual seeking to apply for naturalisation or indefinite leave to remain must pass the official Life in the UK test. Visas for immigration are managed by UK Visas and Immigration, a department within the Home Office. Applications are made at UK embassies or consulates or directly to UK Visas and Immigration, depending upon the type of visa or permit required. The UK operates a global points-based immigration system, which was fully implemented in December 2020 to replace the previous tiered structure. The old tiered points-based system was phased in over the course of 2008, replacing previous managed migration schemes such as the work permit system and the Highly Skilled Migrant Programme.

Contrary to the old Tier 1 route, which was a supply-led system allowing highly skilled migrants to enter without a job offer, the current system is demand-led, requiring almost all economic migrants to have a confirmed job offer and sponsorship from a UK employer. The current immigration system has faced criticism for being significantly exploited, an example of which is criminal networks selling fake jobs and sponsorships to migrants, enabling migrants to stay and enter the UK illegally. The old tiered points-based system that was introduced in 2008 and replaced in 2020 was composed of five tiers and was first described by the UK Border Agency as follows:

- Tier 1 – for highly skilled individuals, who can contribute to growth and productivity;
- Tier 2 – for skilled workers with a job offer, to fill gaps in the United Kingdom workforce;
- Tier 3 – for limited numbers of low-skilled workers needed to fill temporary labour shortages;
- Tier 4 – for students;
- Tier 5 – for temporary workers and young people covered by the Youth Mobility Scheme, who are allowed to work in the United Kingdom for a limited time to satisfy primarily non-economic objectives.

Though immigration is a matter that is reserved to the UK Government under the legislation that established devolution for Scotland in 1999, the Scottish Government was able to get an agreement from the Home Office for their Fresh Talent Initiative which was designed to encourage foreign graduates of Scottish universities to stay in Scotland to look for employment. The Fresh Talent Initiative ended in 2008, following the introduction of points-based system.

== History ==
=== World War II ===
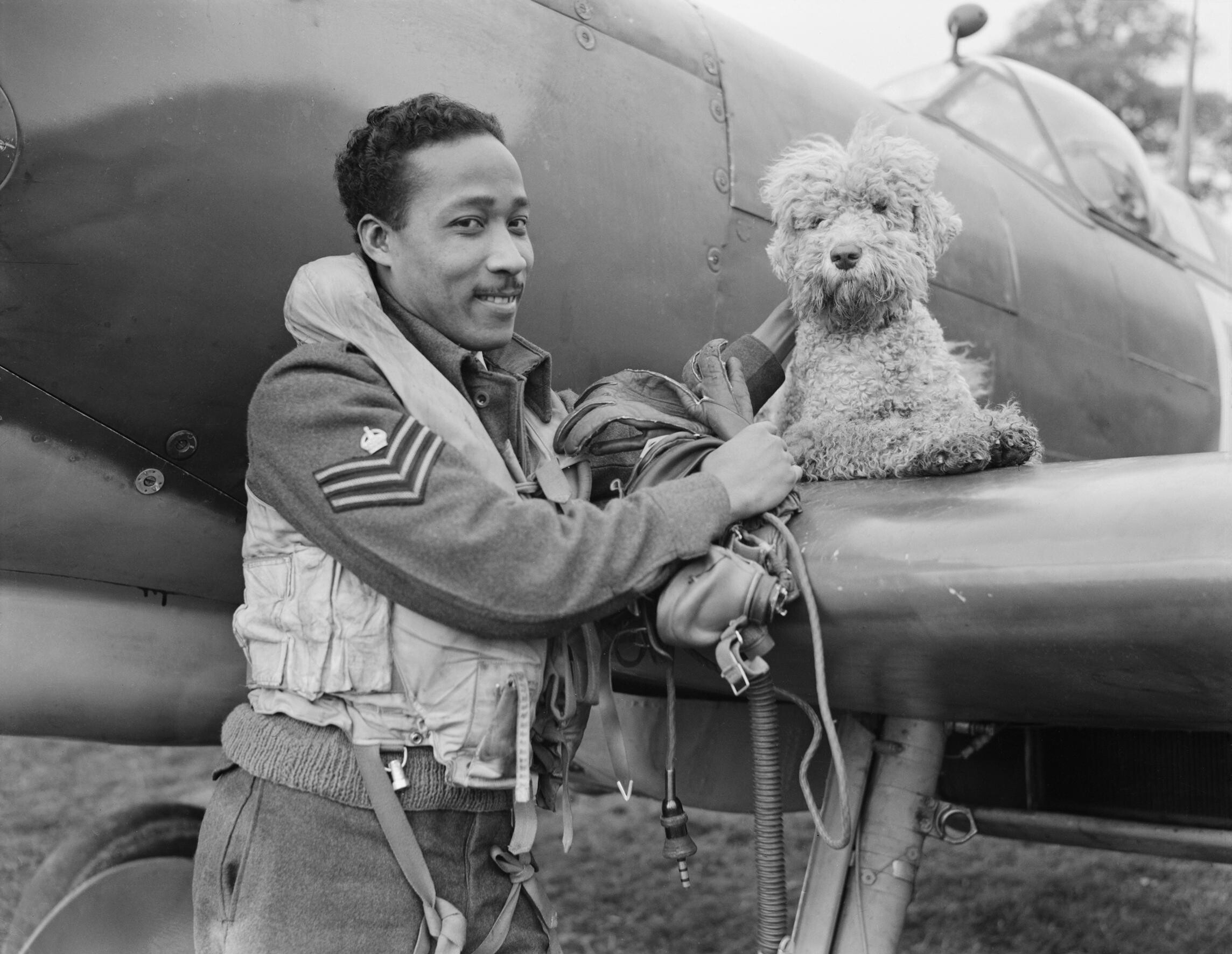
Flight Sergeant James Hyde, a fighter pilot originally from Trinidad, serving in Britain with No. 132 Squadron RAF, c. 1944

Two students from Sierra Leone, then under British rule, at the Colonial Centre, Russell Square, London, 1944

In the lead-up to World War II, many people from Germany, particularly those belonging to minorities which were persecuted under Nazi rule, such as Jews, sought to emigrate to the United Kingdom, and it is estimated that as many as 50,000 may have been successful. There were immigration caps on the number who could enter, and, subsequently, some applicants were turned away. When the UK declared war on Germany, however, migration between the countries ceased. During the Second World War, an estimated 10,000 West Indian men came to the UK. They were the first non-white group to settle in large numbers, and whilst two-thirds of them were repatriated after the war, returning ex-servicemen formed the majority of passengers who arrived on the Empire Windrush in 1948.

At the end of the Second World War, substantial groups of people from Soviet-controlled territories settled in the UK, particularly Poles and Ukrainians. The UK recruited displaced people as so-called European Volunteer Workers in order to provide labour to industries that were required in order to aid economic recovery after the war. In the 1951 United Kingdom census, the Polish-born population of the country numbered some 162,339, up from 44,642 in 1931. There was also an influx of refugees from Hungary, following the crushing of the 1956 Hungarian revolution, numbering 20,990 people.

=== Empire to Commonwealth ===
Following the end of the Second World War, the British Nationality Act 1948 allowed the 800,000,000 subjects in the British Empire to live and work in the United Kingdom without needing a visa. This was not an anticipated consequence of the Act, which 'was never intended to facilitate mass migration'. This migration was initially encouraged to help fill gaps in the UK labour market for both skilled and unskilled jobs, including in public services such as the newly created National Health Service and London Transport. Many people were specifically brought to the UK on ships, notably the 'Empire Windrush' in 1948. The Ireland Act 1949 has the unusual status of recognising the Republic of Ireland, but affirming that its citizens are not citizens of a foreign country for the purposes of any law in the United Kingdom. This act was initiated at a time when Ireland withdrew from the Commonwealth of Nations after declaring itself a republic.

Commonwealth immigration, made up largely of economic migrants, rose from 3,000 per year in 1953 to 46,800 in 1956 and 136,400 in 1961. The heavy numbers of migrants resulted in the establishment of a Cabinet committee in June 1950 to find 'ways which might be adopted to check the immigration into this country of coloured people from British colonial territories'. Indians began arriving in the UK in large numbers shortly after India gained independence in 1947, although there were a number of people from India living in the UK prior to this. More than 60,000 arrived before 1955, many of whom drove buses, or worked in foundries or textile factories. The flow of Indian immigrants peaked between 1965 and 1972, boosted in particular by Ugandan dictator Idi Amin's sudden decision to expel all 50,000 Asians (people of Indian or Pakistani origin) from Uganda. Around 30,000 Ugandan Asians emigrated to the UK.

Following the independence of Pakistan, Pakistani immigration to the United Kingdom increased, especially during the 1950s and 1960s. Many Pakistanis came to Britain following the turmoil during the partition of India and the subsequent independence of Pakistan. Among them were those who migrated to Pakistan upon displacement from India, and then emigrated to the UK, thus becoming secondary migrants. Migration was made easier as Pakistan was a member of the Commonwealth of Nations.

Pakistanis were invited by employers to fill labour shortages which arose after the Second World War. As Commonwealth citizens, they were eligible for most British civic rights. They found employment in the textile industries of Lancashire and Yorkshire, manufacturing in the West Midlands, and car production and food processing industries of Luton and Slough. It was common for Pakistanis to work night shifts and unsociable hours. In addition, there was a stream of migrants from East Pakistan, now Bangladesh. In the 1970s, a large number of East African-Asians, most of whom already held British passports because they had been British subjects settled in the overseas colonies, entered the United Kingdom from Kenya and Uganda, particularly as a result of the expulsion of Asians from Uganda by Idi Amin in 1972. A majority of the Pakistani immigrants to UK trace their origin to Mirpur district in the region presently called Azad Kashmir.

=== Restrictions on immigration from the Commonwealth ===
Although the Committee recommended not to introduce restrictions, the Commonwealth Immigrants Act was passed in 1962 as a response to public sentiment that the new arrivals "should return to their own countries" and that "no more of them come to this country". Introducing the legislation to the House of Commons, the Conservative Home Secretary Rab Butler stated:

The justification for the control which is included in this Bill, which I shall describe in more detail in a few moments, is that a sizeable part of the entire population of the Earth is at present legally entitled to come and stay in this already densely populated country. It amounts altogether to one-quarter of the population of the globe and at present there are no factors visible which might lead us to expect a reversal or even a modification of the immigration trend.

— Rab Butler MP, 16 November 1961

The new Act required migrants to have a job before they arrived, to possess special skills or who would meet the 'labour needs' of the national economy. In 1965, to combat the perceived injustice in the case where the wives of British subjects could not obtain British nationality, the British Nationality Act 1965 was adopted. Shortly afterwards, mainly Asian British passport holders from Kenya and Uganda, fearing discrimination from their own national governments, began to arrive in Britain; as they had retained their British nationality granted by the 1948 Act, they were not subject to the later controls. To manage this exodus from the former East African colonies, the Home Secretary James Callaghan under a Labour party government introduced a bill in February 1968, and got it passed within a week. The new act called Commonwealth Immigrants Act placed entry controls on holders of British passports who had 'no substantial connection' with Britain by setting up a new system. For the first time, the 1968 Act required migrants to have a 'substantial connection with the United Kingdom', namely to be connected by birth or ancestry to a UK national. Those who did not could only obtain British nationality at the discretion of the national authorities.

UK migration from 1970 to 2022

The Conservative MP Enoch Powell had campaigned hard for tighter controls on immigration. On 20 April 1968, one month after the adoption of the Act, he made his famous 'Rivers of Blood' speech, (Note: The Act received Royal Assent on 1 March; the speech was delivered on 20 April.) in which he warned his audience of what he believed would be the consequences of continued unchecked immigration from the Commonwealth to Britain. Conservative Party leader Edward Heath sacked Powell from his Shadow Cabinet the day after the speech, and he never held another senior political post. Powell received 110,000 letters – only 2,300 disapproving. Three days after the speech, on 23 April, as the Race Relations Bill was being debated in the House of Commons, around 2,000 dockers walked off the job to march on Westminster protesting against Powell's dismissal. The next day, 400 meat porters from Smithfield market handed in a 92-page petition in support of Powell. At that time, 43% of junior doctors working in NHS hospitals, and some 30% of student nurses, were immigrants, without which the health service would have needed to be curtailed.

Until the Commonwealth Immigrants Act 1962, all Commonwealth citizens could enter and stay in the UK without any restriction. The Act made Citizens of the United Kingdom and Colonies (CUKCs), whose passports were not directly issued by the UK Government (i.e., passports issued by the Governor of a colony or by the Commander of a British protectorate), subject to immigration control. In 1972, the Heath administration introduced the first proposed Immigration Rules under the 1971 act. The rules proposal drew criticism from Conservative Party backbenchers, because it formally implemented a limit of six months of leave to enter as a visitor for white 'Old Commonwealth' citizens who were 'non-patrial' (did not have Right of Abode under the 1971 act, generally because they did not have a parent or grandparent from the UK). At the same time the proposal opened the door to free movement of certain European workers from European Economic Community member states. Seven backbenchers voted against the proposed Rules and 53 abstained, leading to defeat. Minutes from a Cabinet meeting the next day conclude that 'anti-European sentiment' among backbenchers, who instead preferred 'Old Commonwealth' migration to the UK, was at the core of the result. The proposal was revised, and the first Rules were passed in January 1973.

The foreign born population percentage in England and Wales, 1851 to 2021

The Act abolished the distinction between Commonwealth and non-Commonwealth entrants. The Conservative government nevertheless allowed, amid much controversy, the immigration of 27,000 individuals displaced from Uganda after the coup d'état led by Idi Amin in 1971. Historians have argued that the majority of initial "New Commonwealth migrants" were British settlers and colonial officials and their descendants. Starting in 1962, immigration controls were made less lenient for immigration from the Commonwealth. In practice, these changes only resulted in a small reduction in Commonwealth immigration. In the 1960s, immigration from both the "New Commonwealth" and "Old Commonwealth" averaged at roughly 75,000 per year. The average number of settlements granted in the 1970s was 72,000 per year. This decreased to approximately 54,000 a year in the 1980s and early 1990s. The newly elected Labour government abolished the Primary Purpose Rule (PPR) in June 1997, which, along with other Labour policies, led to a surge in Commonwealth immigration. The Primary Purpose Rule required foreign nationals to prove their marriage to a British citizen or a foreign national with indefinite leave to remain in the UK was not for immigration purposes. In 1998, the Commonwealth immigration rate surged to 82,000 and peaked at 156,000 in 2004.

The British Nationality Act 1981, which was enacted in 1983, distinguishes between British citizens and British Overseas Territories citizens. It also made a distinction between nationality 'by descent' and nationality 'other than by descent'. Citizens by descent cannot automatically pass on British nationality to a child born outside the United Kingdom or its Overseas Territories (though in some situations the child can be registered as a citizen). Immigration officers have to be satisfied with a person's nationality and identity, and entry can be refused if they are not satisfied.

During the 1980s and 1990s, the civil war in Somalia led to a large number of Somali immigrants, comprising the majority of the current Somali population in the UK. In the late 1980s, most of these early migrants were granted asylum, while those arriving later in the 1990s more often obtained temporary status. There has also been some secondary migration of Somalis to the UK from the Netherlands and Denmark. The main driving forces behind this secondary migration included a desire to reunite with family and friends and for better employment opportunities. Non-European immigration rose significantly during the period from 1997, not least because of the government's abolition of the primary purpose rule in June 1997. This change made it easier for UK residents to bring foreign spouses into the country. The former government adviser Andrew Neather in the 'Evening Standard' stated that the deliberate policy of ministers from late 2000 until early 2008 was to open up the UK to mass immigration.

=== Impact of EU enlargement ===
One of the Four Freedoms of the European Union (EU), of which the United Kingdom is a former member, is the right to the free movement of workers as codified in the Directive 2004/38/EC and the EEA Regulations (UK). With the expansion of the EU on 1 May 2004, the UK accepted immigrants from Central and Eastern Europe, Malta and Cyprus, although the substantial Maltese, Greek-Cypriot and Turkish-Cypriot communities were established earlier through their Commonwealth connection. There were restrictions on the benefits that members of eight of these accession countries ('A8' nationals) could claim, which were covered by the Worker Registration Scheme. Many other European Union member states exercised their right to temporary immigration control, which ended in 2011, over entrants from these accession states, but some subsequently removed these restrictions ahead of the 2011 deadline.

The Government announced that the same rules would not apply to nationals of Romania and Bulgaria (A2 nationals) when those countries acceded to the EU in 2007. Instead, restrictions were put in place to limit migration to students, the self-employed, highly skilled migrants and food and agricultural workers. Research conducted by the Migration Policy Institute for the Equality and Human Rights Commission suggests that, between May 2004 and September 2009, 1.5 million workers migrated from the new EU member states to the UK, but that many returned home, with the result that the number of nationals of the new member states in the UK increased by some 700,000 over the same period.

In 2009, for the first time since the enlargement, more nationals of the eight Central and Eastern European states that joined the EU in 2004 left the UK than arrived. Research commissioned by the Regeneration and Economic Development Analysis Expert Panel suggested migrant workers leaving the UK due to the recession were likely to return in the future and cited evidence of "strong links between initial temporary migration and intended permanent migration". A report by the Department for Communities and Local Government (DCLG) entitled 'International Migration and Rural Economies', suggested that intra-EU migration since enlargement had resulted in migrants settling in rural locations without a prior history of immigration.

In June 2010, the newly elected Coalition government brought in a temporary annual cap on the Tier 2 visa route, which was part of the points-based-system that administered non-EU immigration to the UK from outside the EU, with the limit set as 24,100, in order to stop an expected rush of applications before a permanent annual cap of 20,700 for immigrants using the Tier 2 visa route, primarily those applying for jobs that were not on the Shortage Occupation List. The annual cap was imposed in April 2011; accompanying family members and immigrants earning £150,000 (later rising to nearly £160,000) were not counted within the 20,700 annual cap. The Tier 1 visa route was closed for new applicants. The monthly allocation was only first reached in June 2015, more than four years after its introduction, and was only reached again in December 2017 and subsequently each month until July 2018 when the government exempted doctors and nurses from the annual cap on 6 July 2018. The annual cap was never reached again. The annual cap only applied to a small segment of immigration from outside the EU. The annual cap did not apply to foreign students (Tier 4), dependents of foreign students and foreign workers, foreign nationals immigrating via marrying a British citizen or a foreign national with indefinite leave to remain in the UK, intra-company transfers, temporary workers (Tier 5), and immigrants that were in the UK switching from other visa categories to Tier 2.

The Migration Advisory Committee (MAC) first reported in 2008, identifying skilled occupations with labour shortages to support the UK's Points-Based System and producing shortage occupation lists to guide employer recruitment of migrants. In February 2011, the Leader of the Labour Party, Ed Miliband, stated that he thought that the Labour government's decision to permit the unlimited immigration of eastern European migrants had been a mistake, arguing that they had underestimated the potential number of migrants and that the scale of migration had had a negative impact on wages.

The annual cap was suspended when the Tier 2 visa route was replaced by the Skilled Worker visa on 1 December 2020, as part of the UK's post-Brexit points-based immigration system. The result was a massive surge in non-EU+ immigration, which has since dominated immigration to the UK. In the Office for National Statistics' provisional November 2025 estimate for the year ending (YE) June 2025, non-EU+ nationals accounted for 75% of total immigration, 670,000 immigrants out of the total 898,000 immigrants.

=== Post-withdrawal from the EU ===
Immigration to the UK before and after the withdrawal from the EU

The COVID-19 pandemic saw a temporary reduction in net migration. The reduction in net migration peaked at 35,000 in the year ending (YE) September 2020. This was due to a temporary reduction in immigration numbers, as in the YE September 2020, immigration was 606,000, which was lower compared to 793,000 in the YE September 2019. Emigration was speculated during the pandemic to have massively increased; however, emigration actually slightly decreased in the YE September 2020 to 571,000, from 591,000 in the year ending (YE) September 2019.

In 2019, Prime Minister Boris Johnson pledged to reduce net migration to the UK (the number of people immigrating minus the number emigrating) below 250,000 per year. In 2021, net migration to the UK was 488,000, However, following the introduction of the post-Brexit points-based immigration system on 1 January 2021 under the second Conservative government of Prime Minister Boris Johnson, net migration is estimated to have reached a record high of 944,000 in year ending (YE) March 2023, with immigration at 1,469,000 and emigration at 525,000. Many commentators have since referred to the substantial increase in non-EU immigration, enabled under this new policy, as the Boriswave.

Writing in the centre-left magazine New Statesman, Rachel Cunliffe explained, "Unfortunately for those who had anticipated that the introduction of a such a system would bring down overall numbers, given Johnson had also promised to get net migration down, the opposite happened. A quick look at these graphs helpfully provided by the Office for National Statistics shows how dramatically immigration spiked after the new rules were introduced: inwards migration went from 737,000 people in year ending June 2021, to 1.1 million for year ending June 2022, 1.32 million for year ending June 2023." For the year ending (YE) June 2025, the top three nationalities from non-EU+ countries immigrating on work-related visas were Indian, Pakistani, and Nigerian. The Office for National Statistics' provisional estimate, released in November 2025 on migration in the year ending (YE) June 2025, stated that long-term net migration in the year ending (YE) June 2025 was 204,000: non-EU+ nationals at 383,000 net migration, British nationals at -109,000, and EU+ nationals at -70,000.

The 2024 annual report, released under the new Labour government, reviewed recent immigration trends and the government's efforts to link migration policy with domestic skills development. It concluded that net migration between 2021 and 2023 was unusually high, mainly due to increased numbers of international students and non-EU work immigration, especially via the "Health and Care Worker" visa route. The MAC found that increasing domestic skills does not automatically reduce reliance on migrant labour, as impacts vary by sector. For the first time, it provided its own estimates of the fiscal impact of migrants, finding that Skilled Worker migrants are net contributors to public finances. The report recommended improvements to visa schemes, including greater certainty and protections for seasonal workers, and endorsed the continuation of the graduate route for international students.

In May 2025, Prime Minister Sir Keir Starmer introduced new rules on immigration, claiming they would significantly reduce net migration to approximately 100,000 annually. Key measures include extending the residency requirement for citizenship from five to ten years, phasing out the recruitment of foreign care workers by 2028, increasing the immigration skills charge for employers by 32%, shortening the post-graduation work period for international students from two years to 18 months, tightening English language requirements for visa applicants and their adult dependents, and proposing legislation to limit asylum seekers' use of Article 8 of the European Convention on Human Rights to streamline deportations. However, the OBR forecasted in November 2025 that net migration will rise to 327,000 in 2029 and 340,000 in 2030, "as the latest evidence suggests immigrant stay rates in the UK under the new migration system have risen more than we assumed in March".

==== Resettlement schemes ====
The UK also operates the UK Resettlement Scheme, Community Sponsorship Scheme and Mandate Resettlement Scheme. Previous UK resettlement schemes included the Gateway Protection Programme and the Syrian Vulnerable Person Resettlement Programme. As of 30 June 2025, approximately 35,700 people had been resettled in the UK under the specific Afghan relocation and resettlement schemes (ARAP, ACRS, and ARR) since the August 2021 withdrawal. In 2021 the government also launched a scheme for Hongkongers following the Hong Kong national security law, with an estimated thousands emigrating to the UK either as refugees, asylum seekers or under student visas. By January 2024, more than 191,000 Hong Kong-born residents had applied for a visa. In response to the full-scale Russian invasion of Ukraine, the UK in 2022 created multiple special humanitarian visas for Ukrainians. As of 31 March 2025, 223,000 people had arrived in the UK via the Homes for Ukraine (165,000 people), now closed Ukraine Family Scheme (58,000 people), though over 40% (93,000 people) have left since arriving.

== Illegal immigration and asylum ==
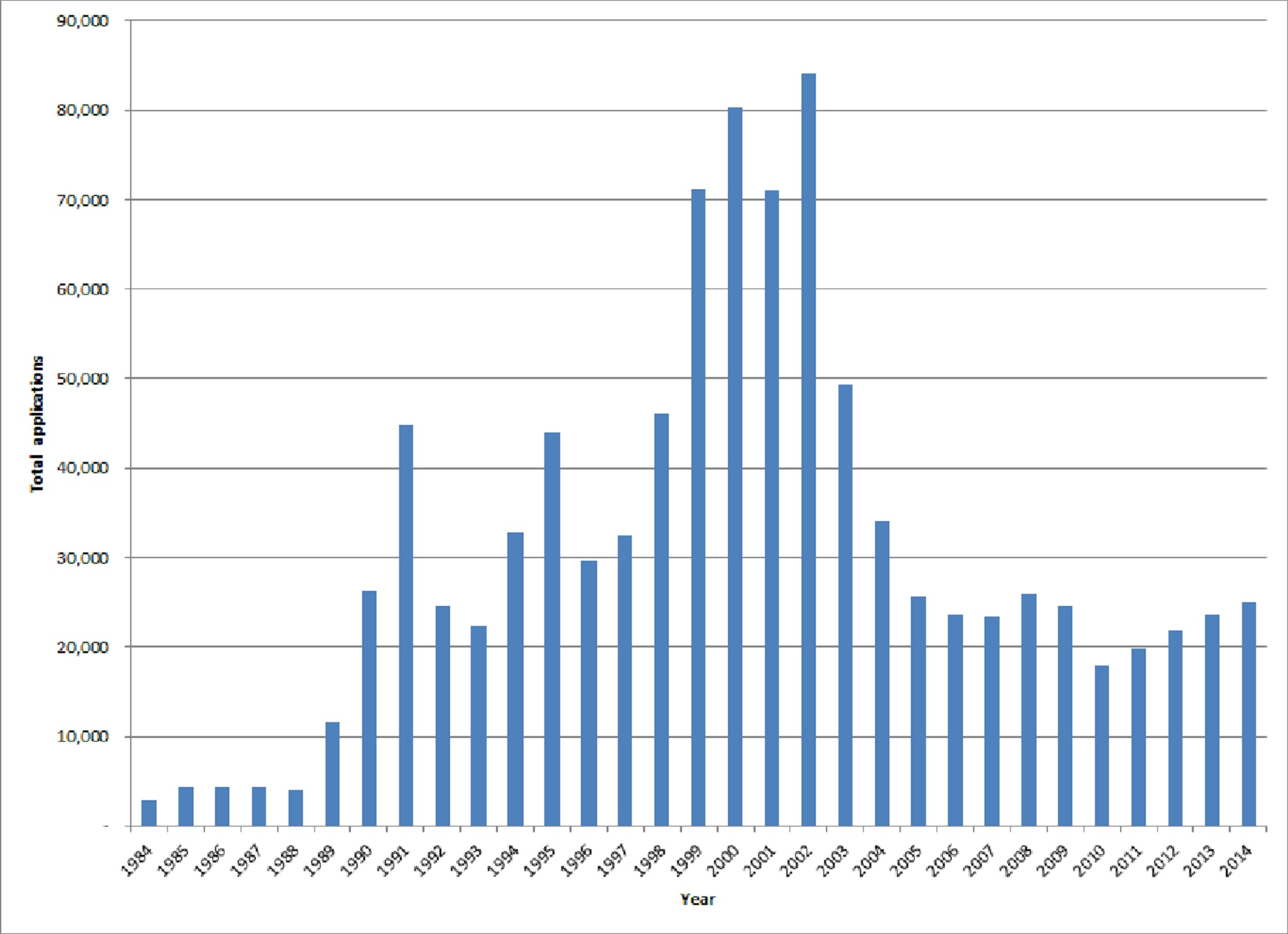
Asylum applications to the UK, 1984 to 2014

Illegal immigrants in the UK include those who have:

- entered the UK without authority
- entered with false documents
- overstayed their visas

Illegal immigrants enter the UK through a variety of clandestine and exploitative routes, by crossing the English Channel in small boats, stowing away in the back of heavy goods vehicles (HGVs) or on international trains, utilising counterfeit or stolen identity documents to bypass airport security, or by legally arriving on short-term visas and subsequently overstaying their leave to remain. Furthermore, some claim asylum at a designated port of entry, such as an airport, immediately upon arrival.

The UK is a signatory to the UN 1951 Refugee Convention as well as the 1967 Protocol and has therefore a responsibility to not return (refoule) people who seek asylum and fall into the legal definition of a "refugee" to where they would face persecution. Policy researchers argue that the 1951 Refugee Convention does not contain a "right to asylum" (a right to be admitted) but only a right of non-refoulement (non-returning to danger). They contend that courts and NGOs have "misunderstood" and "truncated" the text to create a permissive obligation that results in the UK to accepting asylum claims that it legally does not have to.

The Pew Research Center, an American think tank, estimated in 2019 that in 2017 there were between 800,000 and 1,200,000 illegal immigrants in the UK, before the English Channel illegal immigrant crossings that proliferated from 2018 onwards. Pew Research Center later released a new estimate of between 700,000 and 900,000 illegal immigrants in the UK in 2017.

Organised efforts of illegal immigrants attempting to clandestinely enter the UK from Calais date back to at least the late 1990s when the issue rose to prominence, primarily by concealing themselves within freight lorries or cross-border trains before the illegal small boat channel crossings proliferated from 2018 onwards. The situation at Calais escalated significantly in 2015 with the establishment of a large-scale informal camp, the Calais Jungle. Some believe that the UK suffers from widespread student visa abuse; in 2024, 16,000 foreign students, after entering the UK on student visas, applied for asylum. "We've seen visa abuse in the case of legal routes, where people have gone legally and then sought to overstay when their visas weren't extended", said the UK's Indo-Pacific Minister in November 2025.

People smugglers promote the UK, claiming it is the ultimate asylum destination, as working in the gig economy is "easy" and that the government will provide a "free" hotel room. One Istanbul-based smuggler said, "all you need is a mobile phone and a bike" to make "good money". Illegal immigrants housed in Home Office-funded UK hotels bypass standard right-to-work checks by paying between £75 and £100 a week to work using the food delivery app accounts of riders who are legally registered with the delivery platforms. They use bikes and illegal e-bikes, many modified to exceed speed limits. A resident based in a London hotel, in which hundreds of male illegal immigrants live, said "nearly all" of them were working as couriers.

The illegal small boat crossings were first reported on in 2015 when a sporadic number of small boats arrived off the Kent coast from France. On 28 December 2018, the UK Home Secretary declared a "major incident" regarding illegal immigrants attempting to cross the channel. The largest number of illegal immigrants to illegally enter the UK by crossing the English Channel on a single day in 2025 was 1,195 on 19 different boats on 31 May 2025. As of 2 February 2026, the Home Office has detected 193,599 migrants who have crossed the English Channel in small boats since 2018. Crossing the Channel without permission is a criminal offence under UK law, as is to attempt to use a dangerous type of vessel or any unregistered craft under French law.

== Opinion polling ==
=== Opinions on immigration control ===
British opinion polling has generally shown long term public support for immigration control, though the level and form of opposition has varied over time and varies depending on which question is asked.

In 1956, the majority of the public was in favour of immigration (72%, 37% for free entry) so long as work was available (35%) with only 18% thinking it should be controlled, however by 1958, opinion against immigration had shifted with 65% in favour of control, rising to 73% by May 1961. In a Gallup poll in 1958, this polled at 79.1% as a result of the riots, and 81.5% in the London area. In the early to mid-1960s, over 80% of the public felt too many immigrants had been admitted into the country. 61% during this period believed that the country had been harmed by non-white immigration, with 14% believing it had helped. 76% approved of the government's efforts to restrict immigration in 1962, 72% approved again in March 1968. In November 1968, 82 per cent believed there should be further controls on immigration. In another poll in 1968, 95% of the public agreed with efforts to control immigration. In January 1969, 76% believed there should be restrictions on Asians in Kenya from entering the country, while 17% disagreed. In March 1971, 59% agreed with the government's immigration bill, with 17% disagreeing and 25% don't know. 57% in July 1972 agreed with restricting the settlement of Ugandan Asians into the country, with 32% disagreeing. In 1978, 86% thought too many immigrants had been let into the country. In 1984 over 60% polled wanted less Asian and Black immigration, with similar results when polled in the 1990s in 1994. In a 2003 MORI poll, 76% of people were opposed to the abolition of immigration controls.

In 2008, 57% of adults believed that more people should be leaving Britain than entering, with 28% believing the number should be kept at roughly equal amounts. In 2025, 45% supported "Admitting no more new migrants, and requiring large numbers of migrants who came to the UK in recent years to leave", with 44% opposed. 64% opposed "Immigration levels remaining as they are", with 22% supporting. YouGov polling from September 2025 found 50% viewed immigration to have a negative impact, 22% an equal (negative and positive) impact, and 22% views immigration to have a positive impact. During the 1960s, the majority of the public agreed with voluntary repatriation. In March 1968, 59% agreed with voluntary repatriation. At Enoch Powell's speech in April 1968, 64% agreed with voluntary repatriation, and in November this was polled at 74% in agreement. 58% agreed in September 1972 with voluntary repatriation with 40% disagreeing. 43% in 1974 and 37% in 1979 were in favour of forced repatriation.

==== Differences in political party ====
Public salience on immigration, 1994 to 2019

59% of Conservative party delegates in 1979 agreed with voluntary repatriation. 56% believed in 1983 that Britain's immigration laws were "too lenient" and 14% were in favour of forced repatriation. In 2008, 45% of Labour supporters agreed with more people leaving the country rather than entering, with this being 66% among Conservative supporters.

=== Salience ===
Immigration has featured in every manifesto since 1964. In a NOP poll in February 1970, Immigration ranked as the 4th most important issue in the country and mentioned by 26%. Salience on the topic has increased and maintained itself since the late 1990s. YouGov polling showed 'Immigration & Asylum' overtook 'The economy' as 'The most important issues facing the country' in June 2025.

== See also ==
- 2015 European migrant crisis
- 2024 United Kingdom riots
- 2025 United Kingdom anti-immigration protests
- Calais Jungle
- Demographics of the United Kingdom
- Foreign-born population of the United Kingdom
- Historical immigration to Great Britain
- Migration Watch UK
