= British Nationality Act 1981 =

Act of the Parliament of the United Kingdom

British Nationality Act 1981 (Note: Section 53(1).)
- Act of Parliament
- Parliament of the United Kingdom
- Long title: An Act to make fresh provision about citizenship and nationality, and to amend the Immigration Act 1971 as regards the right of abode in the United Kingdom.
- Citation: 1981 c. 61
- Introduced by: William Whitelaw, Home Secretary
- Territorial extent: United Kingdom; Crown Dependencies; British Overseas Territories; Commonwealth of Nations; (Note: Section 53(4)–(6).)

Dates
- Royal assent: 30 October 1981
- Commencement: 30 October 1981 (section 49 and 53); 1 January 1983 (rest of act); (Note: Section 53(2)–(3). The British Nationality Act 1981 (Commencement) Order 1982.)
Other legislation
Amends	Amended legislation: Act of Settlement 1701; Burma Independence Act 1947; British Nationality Act 1948; Ireland Act 1949; Visiting Forces Act 1952; Ghana Independence Act 1957; Federation of Malaya Independence Act 1957; Adoption Act 1958; Cyprus Act 1960; Nigeria Independence Act 1960; Sierra Leone Independence Act 1961; Tanganyika Independence Act 1961; Civil Aviation (Euro-control) Act 1962; Commonwealth Immigrants Act 1962; South Africa Act 1962; Jamaica Independence Act 1962; Trinidad and Tobago Independence Act 1962; Uganda Independence Act 1962; Malaysia Act 1963; Kenya Independence Act 1963; Zanzibar Act 1963; International Headquarters and Defence Organisations Act 1964; Adoption Act 1964; Zambia Independence Act 1964; Diplomatic Privileges Act 1964; Malta Independence Act 1964; Gambia Independence Act 1964; Commonwealth Secretariat Act 1966; Guyana Independence Act 1966; Botswana Independence Act 1966; Lesotho Independence Act 1966; Singapore Act 1966; Barbados Independence Act 1966; West Indies Act 1967; Aden, Perim and Kuria Muria Islands Act 1967; Marine, &c., Broadcasting (Offences) Act 1967; Mauritius Independence Act 1968; Consular Relations Act 1968; Adoption Act 1968; Swaziland Independence Act 1968; Hovercraft Act 1968; Tanzania Act 1969; Family Law Reform Act 1969; Tonga Act 1970; Fiji Independence Act 1970; Tribunals and Inquiries Act 1971; Immigration Act 1971; Sri Lanka Republic Act 1972; Bahamas Independence Act 1973; Pakistan Act 1973; Bangladesh Act 1973; Malta Republic Act 1975; Children Act 1975; Seychelles Act 1976; Adoption Act 1976; Trinidad and Tobago Republic Act 1976; Solomon Islands Act 1978; Tuvalu Act 1978; Judicature (Northern Ireland) Act 1978; Adoption (Scotland) Act 1978; Interpretation Act 1978; State Immunity Act 1978; Kiribati Act 1979; Zimbabwe Act 1979; Papua New Guinea, Western Samoa and Nauru (Miscellaneous Provisions) Act 1980; New Hebrides Act 1980; Belize Act 1981
Repeals/revokes	British Nationality Act 1958; British Nationality Act 1964; British Nationality (No. 2) Act 1964; British Nationality Act 1965; Newfoundland (Consequential Provisions) Act 1950
Amended by	Amending legislation: Civil Aviation Act 1982; British Nationality (Falkland Islands) Act 1983; Income and Corporation Taxes Act 1988; Extradition Act 1989; British Overseas Territories Act 2002; Wireless Telegraphy Act 2006; Borders, Citizenship and Immigration Act 2009; Adoption (Intercountry Aspects) Act 1999; Nationality Immigration and Asylum Act 2002; Immigration (European Economic Area) Regulations 2006; Adoption and Children Act 2002; Human Fertilisation and Embryology (Parental Orders) Regulations 2018; Human Fertilisation and Embryology (Parental Orders) Regulations 2010; Treaty of Lisbon (Changes in Terminology) Order 2011; Civil Partnership Act 2004; Immigration, Asylum and Nationality Act 2006; Immigration Act 2014; Hong Kong (British Nationality) Order 1986; British Nationality (Hong Kong) Act 1997; Hong Kong (War Wives and Widows) Act 1996; Hong Kong (British Nationality) Order 1986; Immigration (Isle of Man) Order 2008; British Nationality (Hong Kong) Act 1990; Transfer of Functions of the Asylum and Immigration Tribunal Order 2010; Asylum and Immigration (Treatment of Claimants, etc.) Act 2004; Legislative Reform (Overseas Registration of Births and Deaths) Order 2014; British Nationality Act 1981 (Remedial) Order 2019; Criminal Justice Act 1982; Criminal Procedure (Scotland) Act 1975; Fines and Penalties (Northern Ireland) Order 1984; Government of Wales Act 2006 (Consequential Modifications, Transitional Provisions and Saving) Order 2009; Civil Partnership (Opposite-sex Couples) Regulations 2019; Human Fertilisation and Embryology Act 2008; British Nationality Act 1981 (Commencement) Order 1982; Statute Law (Repeals) Act 1995; Citizenship (Armed Forces) Act 2014; Mental Health Act 1983; Saint Christopher and Nevis Modification of Enactments Order 1983; British Nationality (Brunei) Order 1983; British Nationality (The Gambia) Order 2015; British Nationality (The Gambia) Order 2018; British Nationality (Maldives) Order 2017; British Nationality (Pakistan) Order 1989; British Nationality (Rwanda) Order 2010; British Nationality (South Africa) Order 1994; British Nationality (Namibia) Order 1990; Defamation Act 1996; Citizenship Oath and Pledge (Welsh Language) Order 2007; British Nationality Act 1981 (Amendment of Schedule 6) Order 2009; British Nationality Act 1981 (Amendment of Schedule 6) Order 2001; Electoral Administration Act 2006; Aviation Security Act 1982; Civil Aviation Act 1982; National Health Service (Consequential Provisions) Act 2006; Nationality and Borders Act 2022; British Nationality (Irish Citizens) Act 2024; Border Security, Asylum and Immigration Act 2025

Status: Amended

Text of statute as originally enacted

Revised text of statute as amended

Text of the British Nationality Act 1981 as in force today (including any amendments) within the United Kingdom, from legislation.gov.uk.

The British Nationality Act 1981 (c. 61) is an act of the Parliament of the United Kingdom concerning British nationality since 1 January 1983.

== History ==
In the mid-1970s the British Government decided to update the nationality code, which had been significantly amended since the British Nationality Act 1948 came into force on 1 January 1949. In 1977, a Green Paper was produced by the Labour government outlining options for reform of the nationality code. This was followed in 1980 by a White Paper by the Conservative government that closely followed the Labour proposals. William Whitelaw, the Home Secretary under Prime Minister Margaret Thatcher, was the chief author. The British Nationality Act 1981 received Royal Assent on 30 October 1981 and came into force on 1 January 1983. Both major parties were in agreement on the new law.

Subsequently, the British Nationality Act has been significantly amended, including:

- British Nationality (Falkland Islands) Act 1983
- Hong Kong Act 1985 and Hong Kong (British Nationality) Order 1986
- British Nationality (Hong Kong) Act 1990, which introduced the British Nationality Selection Scheme
- Hong Kong (War Wives and Widows) Act 1996
- British Nationality (Hong Kong) Act 1997
- Adoption (Intercountry Aspects) Act 1999
- British Overseas Territories Act 2002
- Nationality, Immigration and Asylum Act 2002
- Immigration, Asylum and Nationality Act 2006
- Borders, Citizenship and Immigration Act 2009
- Citizenship (Armed Forces) Act 2014
- Nationality and Borders Act 2022
- British Nationality (Regularisation of Past Practice) Act 2023
- British Nationality (Irish Citizens) Act 2024

== Objectives ==
Between 1962 and 1971, as a result of popular opposition to immigration by Commonwealth citizens from Asia and Africa, the United Kingdom gradually tightened controls on immigration by British subjects from other parts of the Commonwealth.

The Immigration Act 1971 introduced the concept of patriality, by which only British subjects with sufficiently strong links to the British Islands (i.e. the United Kingdom, the Channel Islands and the Isle of Man) had right of abode, the right to live and work in the United Kingdom and Islands.

Most of the British Nationality Act 1948 was replaced by the 1981 Act with effect from 1 January 1983. This added a requirement to hold right of abode at the commencement date to retain British citizenship.

== Provisions ==
=== Reclassification of United Kingdom and Colonies citizenship ===
The act reclassified Citizenship of the United Kingdom and Colonies (CUKC) into three categories:

- British citizenship
- British Dependent Territories citizenship (BDTC); and
- British Overseas citizenship.

In 1968, with the passage of the Commonwealth Immigrants Act 1968 to modify the wording of the Commonwealth Immigrants Act 1962, some CUKCs were stripped of the Right of Abode in the United Kingdom. The act sought to restore once again the link between citizenship and right of abode by providing that British citizenship—held by those with a close connection with either the United Kingdom or with the Crown Dependencies (that is to say, the Isle of Man and the Channel Islands), or both—would automatically carry a right of abode in the UK. The other categories of British nationality would not hold such status based on nationality, although in some cases would do so under the immigration laws.

Whilst in opposition in 1977, the Conservative Party asked Edward Gardner to chair a study group to provide advice on changes to the nationality laws. The resultant Green paper, "Who Do We Think We Are?", was published in 1980 and its threefold definition of nationality formed the basis for the Government's legislation. Originally the paper proposed just two categories of British nationality, British citizenship and British Overseas citizenship. However, the British Dependent Territory governments successfully lobbied for an additional category of nationality, which would cater for those with close connections to any of the British territories.

=== Modification of jus soli ===
The act also modified the application of jus soli (“right of soil”, that is, place of birth) as defining British nationality. Prior to the act coming into force, any person born in the United Kingdom or a colony (with limited exceptions such as children of diplomats and enemy aliens) was entitled to CUKC status. After the act came into force, it was necessary for at least one parent of a United Kingdom-born child to be a British citizen, a British Dependent Territories citizen or "settled" in the United Kingdom or a colony (a permanent resident).

Even following the coming into force of the act, the vast majority of children born in the United Kingdom or colonies still acquire British nationality at birth. Special provisions are made for non-British UK-born children to acquire British citizenship in certain circumstances.

=== Relation to Immigration Act 1971 ===
Under section 11(1) of the act, a CUKC must have had the right of abode under the Immigration Act 1971, as it existed on 31 December 1982, to automatically become a British citizen on 1 January 1983 under the standard CUKC transition at commencement route of the act.

Section 39 of the act then went on to modify the right of abode section of the 1971 measure, eliminating confusing wording as to whether right of abode could be obtained through a grandparent who was a CUKC from outside the UK.

Some people born in the UK after 1983 may have been incorrectly told they were not eligible for a British passport, if their mother had been born in a Commonwealth country (e.g. Canada, or Australia) to a British-born grandparent, but later returned to the UK. In this case, the parent would have retained right of abode from the grandparent, meaning they were already settled at the time of the child's birth (irrespective of whether they themselves were British nationals).

=== Other changes ===
The act made a variety of other changes to the law:

- Mothers as well as fathers were allowed to pass on British nationality to their (UK born) children. However, until 2006, British parents of children born outside the UK or in the UK to a non-British mother (Note: if the mother did not have settled status) had to be married.
- The term Commonwealth citizen was used to replace British subject. Under the act, the term British subject was restricted to certain persons holding British nationality through connections with British India or the Republic of Ireland before 1949.
- Right of Abode could no longer be acquired by non-British citizens. A limited number of Commonwealth citizens holding Right of Abode were allowed to retain it (for example, those born before 1983 to a British parent in a Commonwealth country which had not left, or had membership suspended since then).
- The rights of Commonwealth and Irish citizens to become British citizens by registration were removed and instead they were to be expected to apply for naturalisation if they wanted to acquire British citizenship. Irish citizens, however, who were, or claim British subject nationality retain their right to acquire British citizenship nationality through registration.
- Special provision was made for persons from Gibraltar to acquire British citizenship. Since 2002, this mainly relates to EU nationals who have acquired Overseas Territory Citizen status to live in Gibraltar.
- Foreign spouses were treated equally under the law. Wives of British men could no longer acquire British nationality purely by marriage and husbands of British women were afforded the right to acquire British nationality on equal terms.
- British Crown Colonies were renamed British Dependent Territories (subsequently amended to British Overseas Territories)
- The Channel Islands and the Isle of Man, references to which had been construed as references to colonies under the British Nationality Act 1948, were now to be construed as being part of the United Kingdom for nationality purposes.

In some cases, transitional arrangements were made that preserved certain aspects of the old legislation. Most of these expired on 31 December 1987, five years after the act came into force.

== Subsequent developments ==
After the Falklands War, full British citizenship was granted to the Falkland Islanders whose parents were not born in the United Kingdom by the British Nationality (Falkland Islands) Act 1983. Gibraltarians were also permitted to retain full British citizenship.

Following the Chagos Archipelago handover agreement, the British government is also due to introduce legislation to implement the agreement, including amending the British Nationality Act 1981 to reflect that the British Indian Ocean Territory is no longer an overseas territory following Parliament's ratification of the treaty.

Irish citizens are once again able to register as British Citizens after the enactment of the British Nationality (Irish Citizens) Act in July 2025.

== Criticism ==
Critics argued that one of the main political motivations behind the new law was to deny most Hong Kong-born ethnic Chinese the right of residency in the United Kingdom in the years preceding the Sino-British Joint Declaration in 1984, and later the handover of Hong Kong (then the largest British colony by population) to the People's Republic of China in 1997.

However, CUKCs from Hong Kong had lost their right of abode in the United Kingdom in 1968, unless they were already resident in the United Kingdom before the Commonwealth Immigrants Act. This decision would eventually be reversed in 2021.

Special provisions made in the act (for those who do not have another nationality and for those who lived a long time in the United Kingdom) means there is little pressure for any change to the current law. Similar legislation was later enacted in Australia (1986), the Republic of Ireland (2004) and New Zealand (2005).

== See also ==
- Denaturalization laws
- British nationality law
- History of British nationality law
- Zola Budd
