= Citizenship (Armed Forces) Act 2014 =

Act of the Parliament of the United Kingdom

Citizenship (Armed Forces) Act 2014 (Note: Section 2(1).)
- Act of Parliament
- Parliament of the United Kingdom
- Long title: An Act to make provision in connection with applications for naturalisation as a British citizen made by members or former members of the armed forces.
- Citation: 2014 c. 8
- Introduced by: Jonathan Lord MP (Commons); Lord Trefgarne (Lords)
- Territorial extent: England and Wales; Scotland; Northern Ireland; Channel Islands; Isle of Man; British Overseas Territories

Dates
- Royal assent: 13 March 2014
- Commencement: 13 May 2014
Other legislation
Amends	British Nationality Act 1981; Borders, Citizenship and Immigration Act 2009
Amended by	Nationality and Borders Act 2022

Status: Amended

History of passage through Parliament

Text of statute as originally enacted

Revised text of statute as amended

The Citizenship (Armed Forces) Act 2014 (c. 8) is an act of the Parliament of the United Kingdom that received royal assent on 13 March 2014 after being introduced on 19 June 2013. The act amended the British Nationality Act 1981 in such a way as to not disadvantage foreign and Commonwealth members of the British Armed Forces when applying for naturalisation as British citizens.
