= Nationality and Borders Act 2022 =

British immigration law

Nationality and Borders Act 2022 (Note: Section 88.)
- Act of Parliament
- Parliament of the United Kingdom
- Long title: An Act to make provision about nationality, asylum and immigration; to make provision about victims of slavery or human trafficking; to provide a power for Tribunals to charge participants where their behaviour has wasted the Tribunal’s resources; and for connected purposes.
- Citation: 2022 c. 36
- Introduced by: Priti Patel (Commons); Baroness Williams of Trafford (Lords)
- Territorial extent: England and Wales; Scotland; Northern Ireland; Crown Dependencies; British Overseas Territories; (Note: Section 86.)

Dates
- Royal assent: 28 April 2022
- Commencement: Various (Note: Section 87.)
Other legislation
Amends	Immigration Act 1971; British Nationality Act 1981; Special Immigration Appeals Commission Act 1997; Immigration and Asylum Act 1999; Terrorism Act 2000; Nationality, Immigration and Asylum Act 2002; Criminal Justice Act 2003; Asylum and Immigration (Treatment of Claimants, etc.) Act 2004; Immigration, Asylum and Nationality Act 2006; Tribunals, Courts and Enforcement Act 2007; UK Borders Act 2007; Criminal Justice and Immigration Act 2008; Borders, Citizenship and Immigration Act 2009; Legal Aid, Sentencing and Punishment of Offenders Act 2012; Civil Legal Aid (Merits Criteria) Regulations 2013; Civil Legal Aid (Financial Resources and Payment for Services) Regulations 2013; Citizenship (Armed Forces) Act 2014; Modern Slavery Act 2015; Immigration Act 2016; European Union (Withdrawal) Act 2018
Amended by	Illegal Migration Act 2023; National Security Act 2023 (Consequential Amendments of Primary Legislation) Regulations 2023; Retained EU Law (Revocation and Reform) Act 2023 (Consequential Amendment) Regulations 2023
Relates to	Immigration (Guernsey) Order 2025

Status: Amended

History of passage through Parliament

Text of statute as originally enacted

Revised text of statute as amended

The Nationality and Borders Act 2022 (c. 36) is an act of the Parliament of the United Kingdom proposed in July 2021 relating to immigration, asylum and the UK's modern slavery response. The Act also deals with British overseas territories citizenship and registration of stateless citizens. Amongst other elements, it proposes to introduce "designated places" or "offshore" asylum hubs for application of refugee and migrant asylum claims, potentially in another European country or an African country. Part 5 of the Act grants the Government new powers to limit who is considered a victim of modern slavery, with clauses limiting support in cases where survivors have not complied with State-set deadlines to disclose their abuse. Under Part 5, decision makers would also be asked to consider the survivors' criminal history before deeming them eligible for support.

== Bill contents ==
The bill deals with British Overseas Territories Citizenship, citizenship of children of fathers who are not the husband of their mothers, discretionary adult registration routes, naturalisation for Windrush victims, registration of stateless children amongst other things. The proposed bill effectively criminalizes asylum seekers, who come on "unsanctioned" or "irregular" routes to disqualify them from consideration as refugees. It can also remove British citizenship from dual nationals without notice. It suggests an application process for asylum seekers returning to the fast-tracking of claims, which courts have ruled unlawful in the past.

Part 5 of the Bill is concerned with support provision for modern slavery survivors, introducing an obligation for decision makers to take into account a victims' criminal history, and the time it takes them to provide evidence, before the victim is provided with safe housing, counselling, or a caseworker.

=== Electronic Travel Authorisation ===
The bill proposes a system for pre-registration of most non-UK or Irish citizens travelling into the UK, including across the land border in Northern Ireland. The scheme started in late 2023 and is intended to be fully in place by the end of 2024.

== Background ==
In March 2021, the government introduced a "New Plan for Immigration Policy Statement", also known as the New Plan. The consultation closed on 6 May 2021, with charities expressing the concern that this was insufficient time to gather the views of marginalised communities. An open letter by Refugee Action, supported by more than 100 non-profit organisations, argued: "The documents are only available in English and Welsh... Not one question in the official consultation document asks people about their personal experiences of fleeing persecution."

The final Bill text was introduced to the British House of Commons end of June 2021 by Home Secretary Priti Patel. The results of the 'New Plan for Immigration' consultation were not published at this time.

In November 2021, an amendment to the bill was introduced which, if passed, would allow people to be deprived of British citizenship without being given notice. At the time the Home Office stated its position on citizenship: "British citizenship is a privilege, not a right". As of 27 January 2022, it is in committee stage, with four sittings scheduled until February 10, 2022.

== Part 5 ==
Part 5 of the Nationality and Borders Bill is a cluster of proposed exemptions from modern slavery support. The measures have been designed to tackle 'abuse of the system' which has yet to be substantiated with publicly available data.

=== Exemptions from slavery support ===
Under clause 62, a 'public order' exemption will give the Government powers to ban survivors from support if they have a conviction of 12 months or more. Many non-violent crimes carry 12-month convictions, including activity routinely enforced by traffickers (such as marijuana cultivation or petty theft). The support exemption would also apply to children with custodial sentences.

Exemption from support, on the basis of offending, raised concerns due to the overlap between forced criminality and modern slavery. In the UK, a majority of reported survivors (49%) are forced to commit criminal activity as a result of their exploitation.

Under clauses 60–61, guidance would be issued by the Secretary of State to prevent survivors from accessing a second recovery period, which charities such as the Anti Trafficking Labour Exploitation Unit warned could penalise particularly vulnerable victims who are targeted for repeat exploitation: "It is unclear what situation this clause is designed to address".

=== Trauma deadlines ===
Under clauses 57–58, the Secretary of State would be granted powers to issue potential victims with a 'deadline' by which point all evidence in their case must be shared with the relevant authority. Decision makers will be asked to consider compliance with the deadline as part of their decision as to whether or not somebody has been trafficked. The proposal has been condemned by civil society and the Independent Anti-Slavery Commissioner, Dame Sara Thornton, as disadvantaging those whose memory recall is affected by severe trauma. Survivor groups have outlined the role that clauses 57-58 could play in disincentivising survivors from reporting.

=== Downgrading of support ===
Under clause 59, the threshold that survivors must meet, in order to access the most urgent forms of support and subsistence, will be raised. Under the current system, survivors have access to support, such as a caseworker or translator, before being subjected to the toughest stage of decision making. In November 2021, more than 110 non-profit organisations condemned the 'tightening up' of support, in a letter to the Home Secretary led by the Human Trafficking Foundation.

== Reception ==
In June 2021, the charity Joint Council for the Welfare of Immigrants labelled the proposals as "inhumane and farcical".

In December 2021, the 'Scrap Part 5' campaign was launched by After Exploitation in conjunction with more than 40 non-profit organisations and law firms with specialism in human trafficking. The campaign appeals to Members of Parliament to share concerns with colleagues in the Lords, in order to see Part 5 removed from the Bill at Report stage. In February 2022, Lush cosmetics committed to promoting the Scrap Part 5 campaign in each of its UK shopfronts.

== See also ==
- Police, Crime, Sentencing and Courts Act 2022
