= British Nationality (Falkland Islands) Act 1983 =

Act of the Parliament of the United Kingdom

British Nationality (Falkland Islands) Act 1983 (Note: Section 5(1).)
- Act of Parliament
- Parliament of the United Kingdom
- Long title: An Act to provide for the acquisition of British citizenship by persons having connections with the Falkland Islands.
- Citation: 1983 c. 6
- Territorial extent: United Kingdomthe Crown dependencies; British Dependent Territories; (Note: Section 5(4)–(5).)

Dates
- Royal assent: 28 March 1983
- Commencement: 1 January 1983 (Note: Section 5(2).)
Other legislation
Amends	British Nationality Act 1981
Amended by	Statute Law (Repeals) Act 1995; British Overseas Territories Act 2002; Nationality, Immigration and Asylum Act 2002; Nationality, Immigration and Asylum Act 2002 (Consequential and Incidental Provisions) Order 2003

Status: Amended

Text of statute as originally enacted

Revised text of statute as amended

Text of the British Nationality (Falkland Islands) Act 1983 as in force today (including any amendments) within the United Kingdom, from legislation.gov.uk.

The British Nationality (Falkland Islands) Act 1983 (c. 6) is an act of the Parliament of the United Kingdom on 28 March 1983. The purpose of the act was to grant British citizenship to residents of the Falkland Islands, a British Overseas Territory in the South Atlantic.

Under the British Nationality Act 1981, residents of the Falkland Islands were classed as British Dependent Territories citizen (BDTCs) unless they also had a connection with the United Kingdom itself (such as through having a UK-born parent or grandparent). This meant that Falklands-born British Dependent Territories citizens were restricted in their right to enter and stay in the UK.

The new act conferred full British citizenship on the residents of the Falkland Islands, giving them more preferential status than that of other BDTCs, including BDTCs of Gibraltar (who, at the time, had to voluntarily apply for British citizenship). The act had retrospective effect from 1 January 1983, the date on which the 1981 Act had come into effect.

The act was passed mainly in response to the Falklands War on 1982, which was fought between the United Kingdom and Argentina over the sovereignty of the islands. The United Kingdom maintained that it would stand by the principle of self-determination of allowing the Falkland Islanders to decide their own destiny. It had been argued that the British Nationality Act 1981 had indicated British reluctance to hold the islands, as the residents were not legally full British citizens, and after the war ended in victory for the British, the act was passed to clarify the United Kingdom's commitment to the islands.

The act has been largely superseded by the British Overseas Territories Act 2002, which came into force on 21 May 2002 and granted full British citizenship to BDTCs of most remaining British overseas territories. However, the 1983 act still governs nationality status for islanders born before May 2002.

== See also ==
- Belonger status
- British nationality law
- History of British nationality law
- British Overseas Territories Citizen
