= Commonwealth Immigrants Act 1962 =

Act of the Parliament of the United Kingdom

Commonwealth Immigrants Act 1962 (Note: Section 21(1).)
- Act of Parliament
- Parliament of the United Kingdom
- Long title: An Act to make temporary provision for controlling the immigration into the United Kingdom of Commonwealth citizens; to authorise the deportation from the United Kingdom of certain Commonwealth citizens convicted of offences and recommended by the court for deportation; to amend the qualifications required of Commonwealth citizens applying for citizenship under the British Nationality Act, 1948; to make corresponding provisions in respect of British protected persons and citizens of the Republic of Ireland; and for purposes connected with the matters aforesaid.
- Citation: 10 & 11 Eliz. 2. c. 21
- Territorial extent: United Kingdom; Channel Islands; Isle of Man; (Note: Section 18(1).)

Dates
- Royal assent: 18 April 1962
- Commencement: 1 July 1962 (Note: Section 21(5). The Commonwealth Immigrants Act 1962 (Commencement) Order 1962 (SI 1962/863).)
- Expired: 31 December 1963 (part I) (Note: Section 5(1).)
- Repealed: 1 January 1983
Other legislation
Amends	Matrimonial Causes Act (Northern Ireland) 1939; British Nationality Act 1948; Matrimonial Causes Act 1950
Amended by	Matrimonial Causes Act 1965; Law Reform (Miscellaneous Provisions) (Scotland) Act 1966
Repealed by	Immigration Act 1971; Domicile and Matrimonial Proceedings Act 1973; British Nationality Act 1981
Relates to	Commonwealth Settlement Act 1962; Immigration Appeals Act 1969

Status: Repealed

Text of statute as originally enacted

The Commonwealth Immigrants Act 1962 (10 & 11 Eliz. 2. c. 21) was an act of the Parliament of the United Kingdom. The act entailed stringent restrictions on the entry of Commonwealth citizens into the United Kingdom. Only those with work permits (which were typically only for high-skilled workers, such as doctors) were permitted entry.

== Background ==
Before the act was passed, citizens of Commonwealth countries had extensive rights to migrate to the UK. For instance, in the sparsely populated frontier area of Sha Tin in Hong Kong, 85–90 percent of the able-bodied males left for the United Kingdom between 1955 and 1962 to work in British factories, foundries, railways, buses, hotels, and restaurants.

There was widespread opposition to mass migration in Britain from a variety of political groups, including the Conservative Monday Club, whose Members of Parliament were very active and vocal in their opposition thereto. In response to a perceived heavy influx of immigrants, the Conservative Party government tightened the regulations, permitting only those with government-issued employment vouchers, limited in number, to settle. The leader of the opposition in Parliament at the time, Hugh Gaitskell of the Labour Party, called the act "cruel and brutal anti-colour legislation".

== Provisions ==
The act specified that all Commonwealth citizens, including citizens of the UK and Colonies (CUKCs), without a relevant connection to the UK were subject to immigration control. A person was exempt from immigration control if the person was a Commonwealth citizen born in the UK; a Commonwealth citizen holding a passport issued by the UK government in either the UK or Republic of Ireland; a CUKC holding a passport issued by the UK government (not including colonial governments) anywhere; and their family members. Exemptions also applied to Commonwealth citizens who were ordinarily resident in the UK at any point from 1960 to 1962, as well as wives and children under 16 accompanying a family member resident in the UK.

The act went into effect on 1 July 1962.

Claudia Jones, a Trinidad-born Communist activist, asserted in 1962 that the act "established a second class citizenship status for West Indians and other Afro-Asian peoples in Britain." In 1961, she predicted that if it passed, the act "could be the death knell of the Commonwealth." Ambalavaner Sivanandan, an anti-racist activist, argued that the act served to 'enshrine state racism in law', while Labour politician Barbara Castle labelled it 'a violation of the very idea of the Commonwealth.'

== Aftermath ==
The act cut 'racialised colony and Commonwealth entrants' from an estimated 136,400 in 1961 to 57,046 in 1963.

The act was amended by the Commonwealth Immigrants Act 1968 and was superseded by another new act, the Immigration Act 1971.
