= Commonwealth Immigrants Act 1968 =

Act of the Parliament of the United Kingdom

Commonwealth Immigrants Act 1968 (Note: Section 7(1).)
- Act of Parliament
- Parliament of the United Kingdom
- Long title: An Act to amend sections 1 and 2 of the Commonwealth Immigrants Act 1962, and Schedule 1 to that Act, and to make further provision as to Commonwealth citizens landing in the United Kingdom, the Channel Islands or the Isle of Man; and for purposes connected with the matters aforesaid
- Citation: 1968 c. 9
- Territorial extent: United Kingdom

Dates
- Royal assent: 1 March 1968
- Commencement: 1 March 1968 (except sections 3 and 5); 1 June 1968 (sections 3 and 5); (Note: Section 7(2).)
- Repealed: 1 January 1973

Other legislation
- Repealed by: Immigration Act 1971
- Relates to: Commonwealth Immigrants Act 1962

Status: Repealed

Text of statute as originally enacted

The Commonwealth Immigrants Act 1968 (c. 9) was an act of the Parliament of the United Kingdom.

== The act ==
The act amended the Commonwealth Immigrants Act 1962 (10 & 11 Eliz. 2. c. 21), which had stripped most citizens of Commonwealth countries of the rights of entry, abode and employment in the United Kingdom, further reducing the rights of citizens of the Commonwealth of Nations countries (as of 2024, comprising approximately 2.5 billion people) to migrate to the UK. More importantly, it extended the restrictions of the earlier act to apply to British citizens (termed Citizens of the United Kingdom and Colonies) so that the Act restricted the future right of entry into that part of the territory of the British Realm that lay within the British Isles (i.e., the United Kingdom), previously enjoyed by all Citizens of the United Kingdom and Colonies, to those born there or who had at least one parent or grandparent born there.

== Impact ==
It was introduced amid concerns that up to 200,000 Kenyan Asians, fleeing that country's "Africanization" policy, would take up their right to reside in the UK. (Ethnically Indian Africans in British African colonies had been permitted to retain British citizenship to avoid them becoming stateless, should they be denied the citizenship of their newly-independent nations. Newly independent Uganda too went on to expel ethnically Indian Africans). The bill went through parliament in three days, supported by the leadership of both the governing Labour and main opposition Conservative parties, though opposed by some Labour backbenchers, a few Conservatives such as Iain Macleod and Michael Heseltine, and the small parliamentary Liberal Party.

== Aftermath ==
In the wake of these subsequent reforms of the law on immigration from the Commonwealth to Britain, it became clear that the view of HM Government about immigration was changing. As the states in the British Commonwealth achieved independence, and the idea of a British Empire ceased to be a reality, the Government decided that a more restrictive approach to immigration was necessary. However, hundreds of thousands of African, Asian, and Caribbean expectant immigrants arrived by other methods, including through Europe and by methods that did not involve them having immigration visas. The 1968 Act was superseded by the Immigration Act 1971.

When cabinet papers were released under the 30-year rule, they showed that the legislation was intentionally aimed at "coloured immigrants", and that the cabinet had received legal advice that the bill would breach international law. Home Secretary James Callaghan had made the proposal for emergency legislation at a special cabinet committee on 13 February 1968. The minutes noted the Bill "might be presented as the government giving way to racial prejudice".
