= Immigration Act 1971 =

Act of the Parliament of the United Kingdom

Immigration Act 1971 (Note: Section 37(1).)
- Act of Parliament
- Parliament of the United Kingdom
- Long title: An Act to amend and replace the present immigration laws, to make certain related changes in the citizenship law and enable help to be given to those wishing to return abroad, and for purposes connected therewith.
- Citation: 1971 c. 77
- Territorial extent: United Kingdom; Guernsey; Jersey; (Note: Section 37(2).)

Dates
- Royal assent: 28 October 1971
- Commencement: 1 January 1973 (Note: Section 31. The Immigration Act 1971 (Commencement) Order 1972 (SI 1972/1514).)
Other legislation
Amends	Aliens Restriction (Amendment) Act 1919; British Nationality Act 1948; British Nationality Act 1958; Commonwealth Immigrants Act 1962; Diplomatic Privileges Act 1964; British Nationality Act 1965; West Indies Act 1967; Criminal Justice Act 1967; Criminal Appeal Act 1968; Hovercraft Act 1968
Repeals/revokes	Aliens Restriction Act 1914; Commonwealth Immigrants Act 1968; Immigration Appeals Act 1969; Expiring Laws Continuance Act 1970
Amended by	Criminal Justice Act 1972; National Health Service (Scotland) Act 1972; Transfer of Functions (Local Government, etc.) Order (Northern Ireland) 1973; Criminal Procedure (Scotland) Act 1975; House of Commons Disqualification Act 1975; Northern Ireland Assembly Disqualification Act 1975; Adoption Act 1976; Magistrates' Courts Act 1980; Criminal Justice (Scotland) Act 1980; British Nationality Act 1981; Criminal Justice Act 1982; Mental Health Act 1983; Mental Health (Scotland) Act 1984; Statute Law (Repeals) Act 1986; Transfer of Functions (Immigration Appeals) Order 1987; Immigration Act 1988; Channel Tunnel (Fire Services, Immigration and Prevention of Terrorism) Order 1990; Asylum and Immigration Appeals Act 1993; Statute Law (Repeals) Act 1993; Channel Tunnel (International Arrangements) Order 1993; Statute Law (Repeals) Act 1995; Asylum and Immigration Act 1996; Special Immigration Appeals Commission Act 1997; Immigration and Asylum Act 1999; Adoption (Intercountry Aspects) Act 1999; Anti-terrorism, Crime and Security Act 2001; Nationality, Immigration and Asylum Act 2002; Adoption and Children Act 2002; Courts Act 2003; Criminal Justice Act 2003; Health Protection Agency Act 2004; Asylum and Immigration (Treatment of Claimants, etc.) Act 2004; Serious Organised Crime and Police Act 2005; Immigration, Asylum and Nationality Act 2006; UK Borders Act 2007; Police and Criminal Evidence (Amendment) (Northern Ireland) Order 2007; Immigration (Registration Card) Order 2008; Borders, Citizenship and Immigration Act 2009; Identity Documents Act 2010; Adoption and Children (Scotland) Act 2007 (Consequential Modifications) Order 2011; Legal Aid, Sentencing and Punishment of Offenders Act 2012; Immigration Act 2014; Counter-Terrorism and Security Act 2015; Modern Slavery Act 2015; Justice Act (Northern Ireland) 2015; Human Trafficking and Exploitation (Criminal Justice and Support for Victims) Act (Northern Ireland) 2015; Immigration Act 2016; Human Trafficking and Exploitation (Scotland) Act 2015 (Consequential Provisions and Modifications) Order 2016; Criminal Justice (Scotland) Act 2016 (Consequential and Supplementary Modifications) Regulations 2017; Sanctions and Anti-Money Laundering Act 2018; Immigration, Nationality and Asylum (EU Exit) Regulations 2019; European Union (Withdrawal Agreement) Act 2020; Immigration and Social Security Co-ordination (EU Withdrawal) Act 2020; Immigration and Social Security Co-ordination (EU Withdrawal) Act 2020 (Consequential, Saving, Transitional and Transitory Provisions) (EU Exit) Regulations 2020; Citizens’ Rights (Restrictions of Rights of Entry and Residence) (EU Exit) Regulations 2020; Immigration (Citizens' Rights Appeals) (EU Exit) Regulations 2020; Nationality and Borders Act 2022; Health and Social Care Act (Northern Ireland) 2022 (Consequential Amendments) Order 2022; Illegal Migration Act 2023; Judicial Review and Courts Act 2022 (Magistrates’ Court Sentencing Powers) Regulations 2023; Border Security, Asylum and Immigration Act 2025
Relates to	Immigration (Control of Entry Through Republic of Ireland) Order 1972; Immigration (Guernsey) Order 1993; Immigration (Jersey) Order 1993; Prevention of Terrorism (Temporary Provisions) Act 1989; Immigration and Asylum (Jersey) Order 2012; Counter-Terrorism and Border Security Act 2019

Status: Amended

Text of statute as originally enacted

Revised text of statute as amended

Text of the Immigration Act 1971 as in force today (including any amendments) within the United Kingdom, from legislation.gov.uk.

The Immigration Act 1971 (c. 77) is an act of the Parliament of the United Kingdom concerning immigration and nearly entirely remaking the field of British immigration law. The Act, as with the Commonwealth Immigrants Act 1962, and that of 1968, restricts immigration, especially primary immigration into the UK. It introduced the concept of patriality or right of abode. It was also partly passed to legally clarify the rights of Commonwealth citizens within the United Kingdom in preparation for membership of the European Communities (EC) in which the United Kingdom would become a member state from 1 January 1973. It was coincidentally the same day which the act came into full legal force which gave not only new automatic rights to EC member state citizens but would also give them priority over non-EC citizens (including overseas Commonwealth citizens) under the obligations of the Treaty of Rome, of which the UK become a signatory though the Treaty of Accession, signed on 22 January 1972. In relation to deportation notices, the act is referenced at sections 11 and 23 of the Terrorism Act 2000.

== Background ==
Harold Wilson's Labour government proposed the Commonwealth Immigrants Act 1968 in response to the possibility of 200,000 Asian immigrants leaving Kenya in 1967 due to its attempts at 'Africanisation'. The act was passed in just three days, partly due to the support and fierce drive of then-Home Secretary, James Callaghan. This broke away from the non-discriminatory immigration policy that had preceded it. The UK Government saw a need to appease Canada, New Zealand, and Australia over the future negative impact on them when Britain would join the European Communities, a matter which would be hardest on people who had emigrated from Britain in the expectation of continued close ties.

== Summary ==
One result of the act was to stop the permanent migration of workers from the overseas members of the Commonwealth of Nations, unless they met certain tests. It elaborated the definition of "patrial" migrants, first introduced in the Commonwealth Immigrants Act 1968, as persons born in the United Kingdom and persons who had resided there for the previous five years or longer.

=== Right of abode ===
The Act limited the right to enter and live in the United Kingdom to certain subsets of Citizens of the United Kingdom and Colonies with ties to the UK itself.

That wording of the measure introduced minor confusion into the concept of the right of abode, when it limited right of abode through descent to a CUKC who had a parent who had CUKC status by "birth, adoption, naturalisation or .... registration in the United Kingdom or in any of the islands" or a grandparent CUKC who "at the time of that birth or adoption so had it".

Whether "so had it" referred to a grandparent who had CUKC status generally or CUKC status from the UK and islands specifically was decided by the courts to refer to the latter.

The right of abode on 31 December 1982 was necessary to become a British citizen on 1 January 1983 under the automatic transition at commencement of CUKC provisions of the British Nationality Act 1981, so failing to meet the interpretation of the right of abode test above resulted in no British citizenship through that route.

The British Nationality Act 1981 modified the right of abode section of the Immigration Act 1971 to remove the wording at issue, although the former version still had effect for determinations of British citizenship through right of abode for persons born before 1983, and potentially for their descendants.

== Immigration Rules ==
Section 1 of the act provides for "rules laid down by the Secretary of State as to the practice to be followed in the administration of this Act".

In 1972, the Heath administration introduced the first proposed Immigration Rules under the 1971 act. The rules proposal drew criticism from Conservative Party backbenchers, because it formally implemented a limit of six months of leave to enter as a visitor for white "Old Commonwealth" citizens who were "non-patrial" (did not have Right of Abode under the 1971 act, generally because they did not have a parent or grandparent from the UK). At the same time, the proposal opened the door to free movement of certain European workers from European Community member states. Seven backbenchers voted against the proposed Rules and 53 abstained, leading to defeat. Minutes from a Cabinet meeting the next day contain the conclusion that "anti-European sentiment" among backbenchers, who instead preferred "Old Commonwealth" migration to the UK, was at the core of the result. The proposal was revised, and the first Rules were passed in January 1973.

By August 2018, the Immigration Rules stood at almost 375,000 words – words that were often so precise and detailed that, in normal use, the service of a lawyer had become required to navigate them. That length represented nearly a doubling in just a decade. During the period of the introduction of the "hostile environment" policy under Prime Minister Theresa May, more than 1,300 changes were made to the Rules in 2012 alone. Former Lord Justice of Appeal Stephen Irwin referred to the complexity of the system as "something of a disgrace", and an effort to gradually overhaul the Rules into a more understandable system began to take place. The England and Wales Law Commission began to make recommendations for clearer rules to be adopted.

== Provisions ==
- Part I Regulation of Entry into and Stay in United Kingdom
- Part II Appeals
- Part III Criminal Proceedings
- Part 3A Maritime enforcement
- Part IV Supplementary
- Schedule 1
- Schedule 2 Administrative Provisions as to Control on Entry etc.
- Schedule 3 Supplementary Provisions as to Deportation
- Schedule 4 Integration with United Kingdom Law of Immigration Law of Islands
- Schedule 4A Enforcement powers in relation to ships
- Schedule 5 The Adjudicators and the Tribunal
- Schedule 6 Repeals

== See also ==
- United Kingdom labour law
- British nationality law
- History of British nationality law
- Office of the Immigration Services Commissioner
