= Life in the United Kingdom test =

British permanent residency and citizenship test

The Life in the United Kingdom test is a computer-based test constituting one of the requirements for anyone seeking Indefinite Leave to Remain in the UK or naturalisation as a British citizen. It is meant to prove that the applicant has a sufficient knowledge of British life. The test is a requirement under the Nationality, Immigration and Asylum Act 2002. It consists of 24 questions covering topics such as British values, history, traditions and everyday life. The test has been frequently criticised for containing factual errors, expecting candidates to know information that would not be expected of native-born citizens as well as being just a "bad pub quiz" and "unfit for purpose".

== Purpose ==
A pass in the test fulfils the requirements for "sufficient knowledge of life in the United Kingdom" which were introduced for naturalisation on 1 November 2005 and which were introduced for settlement on 2 April 2007.

Initially, attending the "ESOL (English for Speakers of Other Languages) with Citizenship" course was an alternative to passing the Life in the UK Test, but since 2013 applicants are required to both meet the knowledge of the language and pass the test to fulfil the requirements. Meeting the knowledge of English can be satisfied by having an English qualification at B1, B2, C1 or C2 level, or by completing a degree which is taught or researched in English. Legally, sufficient knowledge of Welsh or Scottish Gaelic can also be used to fulfil the language requirement, but the mechanism by which this can be achieved is not clear in legislation.

Conversely, Home Office guidance states that if anyone wishes to take the Life in the UK Test in these languages (for instance Gaelic‐speaking Canadians or Welsh‐speaking Argentinians), arrangements will be made for them to do so. One test each in Scottish Gaelic and in Welsh have been taken as of 2020.

Plans to introduce such a test were announced in September 2002 by the then Home Secretary, David Blunkett. He appointed a "Life in the United Kingdom Advisory Group", chaired by Sir Bernard Crick, to formulate the test's content. In 2003, the Group produced a report, "The New and the Old", with recommendations for the design and administration of the test. There was dissent among the committee members on certain issues, and many of the recommendations were not adopted by the Government. In 2005, plans to require foreign-born religious ministers to take the test earlier than other immigrants were abandoned by the then Immigration Minister, Tony McNulty.

== Content ==
The test lasts for 45 minutes, during which time the candidate is required to answer 24 multiple-choice questions. To pass the test, the candidate must receive a grade of 75% or higher, i.e. at least 18 correct answers to the 24 questions. Testing is not directly administered by UK Visas and Immigration (which replaced the UK Border Agency in 2013), but is carried out by Learndirect, a private company. As of 20 July 2021 the cost of the test is £50.

From November 2005 to March 2007, the questions for the test were based on chapters 2 to 4 of the book Life in the United Kingdom: A Journey to Citizenship. The handbook was revised in March 2007 and the test was changed to be based on chapters 2 to 6 of it. The additional chapters covered knowledge and understanding of employment matters and everyday needs such as housing, money, health and education. The third edition of the handbook, Life in the United Kingdom: A Guide for New Residents, was released in 2013 and prompted another change in the test format. The test covered the chapters "The Values and principles of the UK", "What is the UK?", "A long and illustrious history", "A modern, thriving society" and "The UK government, the law and your role".

At the time of the test's introduction the materials were primarily about England, but the second edition of the handbook contained more detail about aspects of life in the United Kingdom which differ in Wales, Northern Ireland and Scotland. Applicants taking the test receive a version tailored to where they live; for example, candidates in Scotland will be asked about the Scottish Parliament, but not about the Senedd.

== Pass rate ==
Of the 906,464 tests taken between 2005 and 2009, 263,641 were failed (a pass rate of 70.9%). The results of candidates from countries with a strong tradition of immigration to the UK were variable. The pass rates for people from Australia, Canada, New Zealand, and the United States were all above 95%. In contrast, the pass rates for people from Iraq, Bangladesh, Afghanistan and Turkey were below 50%. The largest single country of origin was India, with just over 100,000 tests taken and 79,229 passed (79.2%).

Furthermore, data available from the 2nd quarter of 2010 to the 3rd quarter of 2014 indicates that of the 748,613 Life in the UK tests taken during this period 185,863 were failed, which means a pass rate of 75.17%. These results initially look comparable to those from previous years. However, the percentage pass rates for the previous version of the test had been rising steadily until the introduction of the new version of the test in March 2013. With the introduction of testing on the new study material from March 2013 pass rates fell to an average of 70%. Analysis of pass rates available for the first 11 months of the new test (from April 2013 to February 2014) show significant variances in pass rate by nationality of origin of those taking the test. For example: Laos 33%, Afghanistan 40%, Syria 67%, Nigeria 69%, India 74%, Canada 95%. The pass rate for those EU citizens taking the test in this period averaged 86% (Austria 71%, Belgium 75%, Bulgaria 84%, Croatia 92%, Cyprus 83%, Czech Republic 93%, Denmark 95%, Estonia 87%, Finland 86%, France 87%, Germany 91%, Greece 91%, Hungary 90%, Ireland 95%, Italy 92%, Latvia 80%, Lithuania 81%, Luxembourg 100%, Malta 100%, Netherlands 81%, Poland 87%, Portugal 80%, Romania 79%, Slovakia 88%, Slovenia 100%, Spain 89%, Sweden 86%).

Upon completion of the test, candidates are not informed of their exact marks. Successful candidates are informed that they have passed and will be given a Pass Notification Letter that they will have to sign, while unsuccessful candidates learn the topics that they should study further. The test may be taken an unlimited number of times until a candidate achieves a pass. Since its inception, there have been numerous instances of fraud and cheating on the test.

== Criticism ==
Prior to its launch, the test produced considerable speculation in the British media about possible questions.

Upon its publication, the associated handbook was widely criticised. Particular criticism was reserved for the section on the UK's history, which was described by the Guardian as a "turgid, abysmal piece of writing," filled with "factual errors, sweeping generalisations [and] gross misrepresentations." The UK Border Agency acknowledged that the first edition of the handbook "did not fulfil [its] role particularly well."

In 2008, Lord Goldsmith stated in a report on citizenship that the test "is not seen typically as a stimulus for learning, though that was one of its stated aims."

In 2011, the government announced its intention to include questions on the UK's history and remove questions on the EU from the test.

In 2012, an article in the New Statesman described the test as mocking Britishness since there was no general agreement amongst the population on what was or was not relevant to culture and history. Every member of the New Statesman editorial team asked by the author to complete the test failed.

In 2013, Thom Brooks' report The Life in the United Kingdom Citizenship Test: Is It Unfit for Purpose? argued that there were serious problems with the test, finding it to be impractical, inconsistent, containing too much trivia and having a gender imbalance.

=== Minority languages ===
The lack of provision for citizenship services in the Irish language has been met with criticism from the Committee of Experts of the European Charter for Regional or Minority Languages, which the UK has ratified for the Cornish language, the Irish language, Manx Gaelic, the Scots & Ulster Scots dialects, Scottish Gaelic and the Welsh language. In a 2014 report detailing the application of the Charter in the UK, the Committee stated that they were given no justification for the inequality in the treatment of Irish speakers in contrast to that of English, Scottish Gaelic and Welsh speakers, and that efforts to rectify the inequality were non-existent.

== See also ==
- British nationality law
- Immigration to the United Kingdom
