= British Nationality Act 1948 =

Act of the Parliament of the United Kingdom

British Nationality Act 1948 (Note: Section 34(1).)
- Act of Parliament
- Parliament of the United Kingdom
- Long title: An Act to make provision for British nationality and for citizenship of the United Kingdom and Colonies and for purposes connected with the matters aforesaid.
- Citation: 11 & 12 Geo. 6. c. 56
- Territorial extent: United Kingdom; British Empire

Dates
- Royal assent: 30 July 1948
- Commencement: 1 January 1949 (Note: Section 34(2).)
Other legislation
Amends	Piracy Act 1698; Act of Settlement 1701; Piracy Act 1744; Legitimacy Declaration Act 1858; Legitimacy Declaration Act (Ireland) 1868; Juries Act 1870; Merchant Shipping Act 1894; Supreme Court of Judicature (Consolidation) Act 1925
Repeals/revokes	Princess Sophia Naturalization Act 1705; Naturalization Act 1872; British Nationality and Status of Aliens Act 1918; British Nationality and Status of Aliens Act 1922; British Nationality and Status of Aliens Act 1933; British Nationality and Status of Aliens Act 1943
Amended by	Newfoundland (Consequential Provisions) Act 1950; Federation of Malaya Independence Act 1957; British Nationality Act 1958; Commonwealth Immigrants Act 1962; British Nationality (No. 2) Act 1964; Singapore Act 1966; Family Law Reform Act 1969; Immigration Act 1971; Interpretation Act 1978; British Nationality Act 1981; Merchant Shipping Act 1995
Relates to	British Nationality Act 1964; British Nationality Act 1965

Status: Partially repealed

Text of statute as originally enacted

Revised text of statute as amended

Text of the British Nationality Act 1948 as in force today (including any amendments) within the United Kingdom, from legislation.gov.uk.

The British Nationality Act 1948 (11 & 12 Geo. 6. c. 56) is an act of the Parliament of the United Kingdom on British nationality law which defined British nationality by creating the status of "Citizen of the United Kingdom and Colonies" (CUKC) as the sole national citizenship of the United Kingdom and all of its colonies.

The act, which came into effect on 1 January 1949, was passed in consequence of the 1947 Commonwealth conference on nationality and citizenship, which had agreed that each of the Commonwealth member states would legislate for its own citizenship, distinct from the shared status of "Commonwealth citizen" (formerly known as "British subject").

The CUKC consolidated British citizenship by putting Britain's colonial subjects on equal footing with those living in the British Isles, and was likely an attempt to avoid decolonisation. Similar legislation was passed in most of the other Commonwealth countries. The act was largely the result of a bipartisan ideological commitment to "a definition of citizenship including Britons and colonial subjects under the same nationality" and at a time "before large-scale migration was considered possible".

It formed the basis of the United Kingdom's nationality law until the British Nationality Act 1981, which came into force in 1983. Most of its provisions have been repealed or otherwise superseded by subsequent legislation, though parts remain in force.

== Background ==
Broadly speaking, nationals of the United Kingdom, the Dominions, and the various British colonies had always shared a common citizenship status of "British subject". However, in 1946 the Canadian parliament passed the Canadian Citizenship Act, which established a separate Canadian citizenship. In response, a Commonwealth conference met in London in 1947, where it was agreed that each of the Commonwealth member states would be free to legislate for its own citizenship, while still retaining elements of a common Commonwealth citizenship.

The resulting legislation passed by the United Kingdom for itself and its colonies was the British Nationality Act 1948, which was introduced by a Labour government. It marked the first time that married British women gained independent nationality, regardless of the citizenship of their spouses. Legislation passed in the other Commonwealth countries included Australia's Nationality and Citizenship Act 1948, New Zealand's British Nationality and New Zealand Citizenship Act 1948, and Southern Rhodesia's Southern Rhodesian Citizenship and British Nationality Act, 1949.

== Provisions of the act ==
The act created the new status of "citizen of the United Kingdom and Colonies" (CUKC) for people born or naturalised in either the United Kingdom or one of its colonies. Provision was also made in certain circumstances for citizenship to be acquired by descent from a CUKC, or by registration.

Despite the fact that the Channel Islands and the Isle of Man were neither part of the United Kingdom proper nor were colonies of it, article 33 of the act provides that when the act mentions colonies, it must be construed as including references to these Islands. Islanders were allowed, upon personal wish and not as a compulsory denomination, to be presented as "citizens of the United Kingdom, Islands and Colonies". This does not constitute a separate category of citizens but is merely a formal denomination.

The fourth schedule of the act repealed almost all of its predecessor legislation, the British Nationality and Status of Aliens Act, 1914.

=== Citizenship by descent from British mothers ===
Although the 1948 act involved a significant shift in underlying policy preferences from the 1914 act, the 1948 act retained the former act's limitation that only a father, not a mother, could automatically transmit British nationality by descent to a child at birth. This would not be changed, prospectively, until the 1981 act came into force on 1 January 1983.

The option for persons, who were thus deprived of citizenship at birth under the 1948 act, to be registered as citizens was introduced in piecemeal fashion:

- registration between 16 September 1964 and 31 December 1982, pursuant to amendments to the 1948 act by the British Nationality (No. 2) Act 1964 (in response to the Convention on the Reduction of Statelessness), for those affected if they were, and had always been, stateless;
- registration between 7 February 1979 and 31 December 1982, under a policy change by Home Secretary Merlyn Rees, for those affected and under 18 on the date of application;
- registration between 30 April 2003 and present, pursuant to the amendments to the 1981 act by the Nationality, Immigration and Asylum Act 2002 (adding section 4C to the 1981 act), for those affected who were born between 8 February 1961 (i.e. who were under 18 on the date of the Rees policy announcement) and 31 December 1982; and
- registration between 13 January 2010 and present, pursuant to the amendments to the 1981 act by the Borders, Citizenship and Immigration Act 2009 (amending section 4C), for those affected who were born between 1 January 1949 and 6 February 1961 (and a select broader cohort deprived by the 1948 act but who were not previously eligible for registration).

== Reform of the act, and subsequent Acts ==
Between 1962 and 1971, as a result of popular opposition to immigration by Commonwealth citizens from Asia and Africa, the United Kingdom gradually tightened controls on immigration by British subjects from other parts of the Commonwealth.

The Immigration Act 1971 introduced the concept of patriality, by which only British subjects with sufficiently strong links to the British Islands (i.e. the United Kingdom, the Channel Islands and the Isle of Man) had right of abode, the right to live and work in the United Kingdom and Islands.

Most of the 1948 Act was replaced by the British Nationality Act 1981 with effect from 1 January 1983. This added a requirement to hold right of abode at the commencement date to retain British citizenship.

== The act today ==
The only significant provision of the act to survive today is section 3, which concerns the extra-territorial jurisdiction of the criminal courts over crimes committed by British subjects overseas. Generally, British criminal law does not apply to things done overseas, but there are some exceptions for acts done abroad by British subjects, such as murder. Section 3 restricted the scope of this jurisdiction to CUKCs (except in respect of crimes that would be against UK law even if committed by aliens). This was necessary so that, for example, a Canadian citizen who committed murder in Canada could not be prosecuted for it in a British court instead of in Canada.

As modified by section 51 of the British Nationality Act 1981, section 3 now restricts this jurisdiction to British citizens, British Overseas Territories citizens, British Overseas citizens and British Nationals (Overseas). Note, however, that section 3 is subject to any subsequent legislation to different effect, such as section 72 of the Sexual Offences Act 2003.

Furthermore, in spite of the fact that most of this Act has been repealed by the British Nationality Act 1981, for people born before 1983 the acquisition of new categories of British nationality created by the 1981 Act is often made dependent on one's nationality status prior to the effective date of the 1981 Act. This therefore means that many of the original provisions of the British Nationality Act 1948 are still relevant today.

== See also ==
- British nationality law
- History of British nationality law
- Immigration Act
