= British subject =

Legal term that has evolved over time

The term "British subject" has several different meanings depending on the period. Before 1949, it referred to almost all people born in the British Empire (including the United Kingdom, Dominions, and colonies, but excluding protectorates and protected states). Between 1949 and 1983, the term was synonymous with Commonwealth citizen. Currently, it refers to people possessing a class of British nationality largely granted under limited circumstances to those connected with Ireland or British India born before 1949. Individuals with this nationality are British nationals and Commonwealth citizens, but not British citizens.

The status under the current definition does not automatically grant the holder right of abode in the United Kingdom but the vast majority of British subjects do have this entitlement. As of 2025, about 17,900 British subjects hold valid British passports with this status and enjoy consular protection when travelling abroad; about 2,000 do not have right of abode in the UK.

Nationals of this class without right of abode are subject to immigration controls when entering the UK. If they hold no other citizenship, British subjects without right of abode in the UK are effectively stateless, as they are not guaranteed the right to enter the country in which they are nationals.

== Background ==
=== Development from feudal allegiance ===
Before the concept of nationality was codified in legislation, inhabitants of English communities owed allegiance to their feudal lords, who were themselves vassals of the monarch. This system of loyalty, indirectly owed to the monarch personally, developed into a general establishment of subjecthood to the Crown. Calvin's Case in 1608 established the principle of jus soli, that all those who were born within Crown dominions were natural-born subjects. After the Acts of Union 1707, English and Scottish subjects became British subjects. Natural-born subjects were considered to owe perpetual allegiance to the Crown, and could not voluntarily renounce British subject status until 1870, when it was first permitted.

Prior to 1708, foreigners could be naturalised only through Acts of Parliament. Although procedures were created after this point for aliens to become subjects, personalised naturalising legislation continued to be enacted until 1975. Additionally, the monarch could personally make any individual a subject by royal prerogative. By this method, a foreigner became a denizen – although they were no longer considered an alien, they could not pass subject status to their children by descent and were barred from Crown service and public office. This mechanism was no longer used after 1873.

Until the mid-19th century, it was unclear whether nationality regulations in Great Britain (the United Kingdom from 1801) were applicable elsewhere in the Empire. Individual colonies had each developed their own procedures and requirements for naturalisation, granting subject status at the discretion of those local governments. In 1847, Parliament formalised a clear distinction between subjects who were naturalised in the UK and those who became British subjects in other territories. Individuals naturalised in the UK were deemed to have received the status by imperial naturalisation, which was valid throughout the Empire. Those naturalised in a colony were said to have gone through local naturalisation and were given subject status valid only within the relevant territory. However, when travelling outside of the Empire, British subjects who were locally naturalised in a colony were still entitled to imperial protection.

British subject status was codified in statute law for the first time by the British Nationality and Status of Aliens Act 1914, which formalised the status as a common nationality among the United Kingdom, its colonies, and the self-governing Dominions. Dominions that adopted this Act as part of their own nationality laws (Australia, Canada, Ireland, Newfoundland, New Zealand, and South Africa) were authorised to grant subject status to aliens by imperial naturalisation.

During this time, British subject status was the principal form of British nationality. There were certain territories that came under British protection or administration but were not properly possessions of the Crown. These included protectorates, protected states, League of Nations mandates, and United Nations trust territories. They were deemed to be foreign lands, so birth in one of these areas did not confer the status of British subject. Instead, most people associated with these territories were treated as British protected persons.

=== Transition to Commonwealth citizenship ===
Following the First World War, the Dominions developed distinct national identities. Britain formally recognised this at the 1926 Imperial Conference, jointly issuing the Balfour Declaration with all the Dominion heads of government, which stated that the United Kingdom and Dominions were autonomous and equal to each other within the British Commonwealth of Nations. Legislative independence of the Dominions was given legal effect after passage and ratification of the Statute of Westminster 1931. Diverging developments in Dominion nationality laws, as well as growing assertions of local national identity separate from that of Britain and the Empire, culminated with the creation of Canadian citizenship in 1946. Combined with the approaching independence of India and Pakistan in 1947, nationality law reform was necessary at this point to address ideas that were incompatible with the previous system.

The British Nationality Act 1948 redefined British subject as any citizen of the United Kingdom, its colonies, or other Commonwealth countries. Commonwealth citizen was first defined in this Act to have the same meaning. This alternative term was necessary to retain a number of newly independent countries in the Commonwealth that wished to become republics rather than preserve the monarch as head of state. The change in naming also indicated a shift in the base theory to this aspect of British nationality; allegiance to the Crown was no longer a requirement to possess British subject status and the common status would be maintained by voluntary agreement among the various members of the Commonwealth.

British subject/Commonwealth citizen status co-existed with the citizenships of each Commonwealth country. A person born in Australia would be both an Australian citizen and a British subject. British subjects under the previous meaning who held that status on 1 January 1949 because of a connection with the United Kingdom or a remaining colony became Citizens of the United Kingdom and Colonies (CUKC). CUKC status was the principal form of British nationality during this period of time.

There was also a category of people called British subjects without citizenship (BSWC). Irish citizens who fulfilled certain requirements could file formal claims with the Home Secretary to remain British subjects under this definition. Additionally, those who did not qualify for CUKC status or citizenship in other Commonwealth countries, or were connected with a country that had not yet defined citizenship laws, would transitionally remain British subjects in this group.

All British subjects initially held an automatic right to settle in the United Kingdom, though non-white immigration into the United Kingdom was systemically discouraged. This entitlement was part of a wider initiative to preserve close relationships with certain Dominions and colonies (Australia, Canada, New Zealand, South Africa, and Southern Rhodesia) and to moderate nationalist attitudes within the Commonwealth. It was thought that only a limited number of non-white colonial migrants would ever seek to settle in the UK. However, strong economic conditions in Britain after the Second World War attracted an unprecedented wave of colonial migration. In response to growing anti-immigration sentiment, Parliament imposed immigration controls on subjects originating from outside the British Islands with the Commonwealth Immigrants Act 1962. The Immigration Act 1971 relaxed controls on patrials, subjects whose parents or grandparents were born in the United Kingdom, and gave effective preferential treatment to Commonwealth citizens from white-majority countries.

Outside of the United Kingdom, British subjects already did not have an automatic right to settle. Australia, Canada, New Zealand, and South Africa had immigration restrictions in place for British subjects from outside their jurisdictions targeted at non-white migrants since the late 19th century. After 1949, non-local British subjects under the new definition who were resident in these independent Commonwealth countries continued to retain certain privileges. This included eligibility to vote in elections, for preferred paths to citizenship, and for welfare benefits. British subjects were eligible to vote in New Zealand until 1975 and Australia until 1984 (though subjects on the electoral roll in that year are still eligible). In Canada, voting eligibility was revoked at the federal level in 1975, but not fully phased out in provinces until 2006.

Because each country now defined British subject in separate pieces of legislation and these definitions were not always updated or kept at parity, individuals could have been British subjects in one country at a given time but not another. For example, a South African citizen in 1967 would have been considered a British subject in Canada, but not the United Kingdom or South Africa. The country was included in the list of Commonwealth nations in Canadian law, despite South Africa having left the Commonwealth in 1961 and not rejoining it until 1994.

=== Redefinition as residual nationality class ===
By the 1980s, most colonies of the British Empire had become independent. Parliament updated nationality law to reflect the more modest geographical boundaries of the United Kingdom. The British Nationality Act 1981 recategorised CUKCs into different nationality groups based on patriality and birthplace. CUKCs with the right of abode in the United Kingdom or those closely connected with the UK, Channel Islands, or Isle of Man became British citizens while those connected with a remaining colony became British Dependent Territories citizens (later renamed British Overseas Territories citizens). Those who could not be reclassified into either of these statuses and who were no longer associated with a British territory became British Overseas citizens.

While all nationals under those categories continue to be Commonwealth citizens, the definition of British subject was limited to its present meaning. It currently only includes the category of people previously called British subjects without citizenship as well as women who married such persons and registered for the status. The term is no longer synonymous with Commonwealth citizen. British citizens are not British subjects as defined by the 1981 Act.

In other Commonwealth countries that still retained it, British subject status under the previous definition was progressively abolished. The status remained in law in South Africa until 1961, Canada until 1977, New Zealand until 1977, and Australia until 1987.

Though the British government has never conceded to suggestions that its policies and legislation concerning nationality were discriminatory or racist, Parliament has since revised nationality law to correct remaining cases of statelessness caused by deprivation of the right to settle in the UK after 1962. The Nationality, Immigration and Asylum Act 2002 granted British subjects who do not hold and have not lost an alternative nationality the right to register as British citizens.

== Acquisition and loss ==
Naturalisation as a British subject is not possible. It is expected that British subjects will obtain citizenship in the country they reside in and that the number of active status holders will eventually dwindle until there are none. It is currently only possible to transfer British subject status by descent if an individual born to a British subject parent would otherwise be stateless. The status was granted in 1949 to British subjects who did not become CUKCs or citizens of any other Commonwealth country or the Republic of Ireland. Irish citizens born before 1949 may make formal claims at any time to retain status as British subjects based on: Crown service in the UK, passports or certificates of entitlement describing holders as British subjects, or proof of other associations with the UK or any former British territory. Women married to British subjects were also able to register for the status before 1983. Virtually all other individuals with this status hold it by virtue of their own, or their father's, birth in former British India.

British subjects automatically lose the status if they acquire any other nationality, including other British nationality classes, unless they possess the status through a connection with Ireland. It can also be voluntarily relinquished by a declaration made to the Home Secretary, provided that an individual already possesses or intends to acquire another nationality. British subjects may be stripped of the status if it was fraudulently acquired. There is no path to restore British subject status once lost.

== Rights and privileges ==
British subjects who do not have right of abode in the United Kingdom are exempted from obtaining a visa or entry certificate when visiting the UK for less than six months. When travelling in other countries, they may seek British consular protection. British subjects are not considered foreign nationals when residing in the UK and are entitled to certain rights as Commonwealth citizens. These include exemption from registration with local police, voting eligibility in UK elections, and the ability to enlist in the British Armed Forces. British subjects are also eligible to serve in all Civil Service posts, be granted British honours, receive peerages, and sit in the House of Lords. If given indefinite leave to remain (ILR), they are eligible to stand for election to the House of Commons and local government. British subjects only have right of abode in the UK if they were born to at least one British subject parent who themself was born in the UK or, if they are female, were married to a person with right of abode before 1983. The vast majority of people who still retain British subject status have UK right of abode. As of 2025, about 17,900 people hold valid British passports with the status, and about 2,000 do not have right of abode.

All British subjects may become British citizens by registration, rather than naturalisation, after residing in the United Kingdom for more than five years and possessing either right of abode or ILR for more than one year. Registration in this way confers citizenship otherwise than by descent, meaning that children born outside of the UK to those successfully registered will be British citizens by descent. British subjects with right of abode may also register for citizenship without residence requirements by virtue of their birth to a parent born in the UK. Applicants who successfully register in this way become British citizens by descent and cannot pass citizenship to their children born outside of the UK. Individuals who become British citizens would automatically lose British subject status if they are not connected with Ireland. Otherwise, British subjects may also be British citizens simultaneously. British subjects who do not hold and have not lost any other nationality on or after 4 July 2002 are entitled to register as British citizens.

In Australia, "British subjects" (Note: As defined in the Commonwealth Electoral Act 1918, so now comprising the 48 Commonwealth citizenships that devolved from that status, such as Canadian, British, Malaysian and New Zealand citizenships, i.e. Commonwealth citizen. It is not to the UK legal concept of "British subject".) who were enrolled to vote before 26 January 1984 retain that right in elections and referendums despite the introduction of Australian citizenship requirements since then. Additionally, voting remains compulsory even if their enrolment had lapsed. As of 2023 there were over 100,000 enrolled to vote with the status of "British subject".

== Restrictions ==
In a case before Court of Justice of the European Union, it was argued by one of the parties that British subjects who hold no other nationality are de facto stateless because they do not have a right to enter the country that claims them as nationals. The Nationality, Immigration and Asylum Act 2002 allowed these individuals to register as British citizens, after which statelessness was generally resolved for people who were solely British subjects.

=== United Kingdom ===
British subjects without right of abode are subject to immigration controls when entering the United Kingdom. They are required to pay an immigration health surcharge to access National Health Service benefits when residing in the UK for longer than six months and do not qualify for most welfare programmes.

=== European Union ===
Before the United Kingdom withdrew from the European Union on 31 January 2020, full British citizens and British subjects with right of abode in the UK were European Union citizens. British subjects without right of abode in the UK were not EU citizens and did not enjoy freedom of movement in other EU countries. They were, and continue to be, exempted from obtaining visas when visiting the Schengen Area.
