= Borders, Citizenship and Immigration Act 2009 =

Act of the Parliament of the United Kingdom

Borders, Citizenship and Immigration Act 2009 (Note: Section 59.)
- Act of Parliament
- Parliament of the United Kingdom
- Long title: An Act to provide for customs functions to be exercisable by the Secretary of State, the Director of Border Revenue and officials designated by them; to make provision about the use and disclosure of customs information; to make provision for and in connection with the exercise of customs functions and functions relating to immigration, asylum or nationality; to make provision about citizenship and other nationality matters; to make further provision about immigration and asylum; and for connected purposes.
- Citation: 2009 c. 11
- Introduced by: Jacqui Smith MP (Commons); Lord West of Spithead (Lords)
- Territorial extent: England and Wales; Scotland; Ireland; (Note: Section 57.)

Dates
- Royal assent: 21 July 2009
- Commencement: Various (Note: Section 58.)
Other legislation
Amends	Immigration Act 1971; Judicature (Northern Ireland) Act 1978; Immigration and Asylum Act 1999; Immigration, Asylum and Nationality Act 2006; Tribunals, Courts and Enforcement Act 2007
Amended by	Treaty of Lisbon (Changes in Terminology) Order 2011; Finance Act 2012; Energy Act 2013; Police and Fire Reform (Scotland) Act 2012 (Consequential Provisions and Modifications) Order 2013; Citizenship (Armed Forces) Act 2014; Immigration Act 2014; Public Bodies (Merger of the Director of Public Prosecutions and the Director of Revenue and Customs Prosecutions) Order 2014; Investigatory Powers Act 2016; Money Laundering, Terrorist Financing and Transfer of Funds (Information on the Payer) Regulations 2017; Data Protection Act 2018; Taxation (Cross-border Trade) Act 2018; Immigration, Nationality and Asylum (EU Exit) Regulations 2019; Taxation (Post-transition Period) Act 2020; Nationality and Borders Act 2022; Criminal Justice Act 2003 (Commencement No. 33) and Sentencing Act 2020 (Commencement No. 2) Regulations 2022; Retained EU Law (Revocation and Reform) Act 2023 (Consequential Amendment) Regulations 2023; Judicial Review and Courts Act 2022 (Magistrates’ Court Sentencing Powers) Regulations 2023; Police and Criminal Evidence (Northern Ireland) Order 1989 (Application to Immigration Officers and Designated Customs Officials in Northern Ireland) and Consequential Amendments Regulations 2026

Status: Amended

History of passage through Parliament

Text of statute as originally enacted

Revised text of statute as amended

The Borders, Citizenship and Immigration Act 2009 (c. 11) is an act of the Parliament of the United Kingdom.

Prior to the act, residents who had spent five years living in the United Kingdom were able to apply for Indefinite Leave to Remain. Under the act, five years of residence leads to "probationary citizenship", which can lead to full citizenship after earning a certain number of "points", such as volunteering or "civic activism."

The act gives customs and immigration powers to staff of the UK Border Agency to deal with the smuggling of drugs, tobacco and weapons.

The act imposes a duty on the Secretary of State to safeguard and promote the welfare of children in the UK.

== Commencement ==
See section 58 of the act and the Borders, Citizenship and Immigration Act 2009 (Commencement No. 1) Order 2009 (SI 2009/2731 (C. 119)).
