= Canadians of convenience =

Canadian citizens living permanently outside Canada

"Canadians of convenience" is a pejorative referring to individuals with Canadian citizenship who live permanently outside of Canada without "substantive ties" to Canada. Some definitions use the term to refer to people who immigrate to Canada, meet the residency requirement to become a naturalized citizen, and then return to live in their original home country while maintaining their Canadian citizenship. The term implies that these citizens only acquire or maintain their citizenship for personal gain or to otherwise benefit from Canada. For example, so that they may call on the Canadian government for protection in the event of an emergency, or to be able to travel internationally with a Canadian passport.

The term was popularized in 2006 by Canadian politician Garth Turner in response to the evacuation of Canadian citizens from Lebanon during the 2006 Lebanon War. Statistics and analyses are unavailable on the distinction between evacuees who were long-term residents of Lebanon and those who were not and on how many of the long-term residents had returned to Lebanon immediately after acquiring their Canadian citizenship.

== History ==
=== Coining ===
Although the term was used earlier by others (such as Peter Worthington of the Toronto Sun), it was made most prominent during the conflict in Lebanon through posts by Garth Turner, then-Conservative MP for Halton, on his official blog. Turner questioned the fairness of paying CA$75,000 for each Lebanese evacuee, saying, among other things, "that's a hell of a lot of money to donate to people who do not live here, don't pay taxes here, and may never come here again in their lives." (The actual cost for each evacuee would be approximately $6,300; or $94 million for 15,000 people.)

The National Post asserted later in 2006 that, of the 15,000 evacuated, about 7,000 may have returned to Lebanon within a month of being evacuated.

=== Response ===
Some criticized Turner for suggesting that there are two classes of Canadian citizens.

Other editorials supported the use of the phrase "Canadians of convenience," arguing that many immigrants meet their minimum residence requirement to gain Canadian citizenship (which, since 1977, can essentially never be revoked), leave the country, and only call upon their Canadian citizenship again when in need of Canada's healthcare (which is publicly funded) or emergency evacuation from a war zone. According to The Economist: "Of the 5.5 million Canadians born abroad, 560,000 declared in the most recent census that they hold passports from another country."

== Government policy ==
Canada permits multiple citizenship. The official policy of the Canadian government is that a dual citizen is the responsibility of the foreign government when living in that foreign country. However, in practice, Canada generally does not distinguish between Canadians with multiple citizenships and those with singular citizenships, as was the case during the 2006 evacuation from Lebanon. Prime Minister Stephen Harper said in 2006 that he planned to review the matter.

For citizens of countries that do not allow multiple citizenship (such as India, China, or Singapore), those who become Canadian citizens often lose their original citizenship if the original country learns of the Canadian citizenship, after which the individual is generally required to renounce their Canadian citizenship in order to be naturalised in that country.

=== Amendments to Citizenship Act ===
Public displeasure over Canadian citizens evacuated from Lebanon during the 2006 Israel-Lebanon conflict spurred Bill C-37, to amend the Citizenship Act. Until that point, it was possible for Canadian citizens to pass on their citizenship to endless generations born outside Canada.

A new law came into effect on 17 April 2009, instituting the "first generation limitation," among other things. To restrict the scope of those eligible for Canadian citizenship for the future, citizenship by descent under the new law would be limited—with a few exceptions— to one generation born outside Canada.

On 10 June 2010 in the House of Commons, then-Minister of Citizenship, Immigration and Multiculturalism Jason Kenney said:

Citizenship is about more, far more than a right to carry a passport or to vote. It defines who we are as Canadians, including our mutual responsibilities to one another and a shared commitment to the values that are rooted in our history like freedom, unity and loyalty. That's why we must protect the values of Canadian citizenship and must take steps against those who would cheapen it.… We will strengthen the new limitation on the ability to acquire citizenship for the second generation born abroad.

The new law would only confer Canadian citizenship to those who were born to a Canadian parent who, him/herself, was either born in Canada or became a Canadian citizen through naturalization—i.e., by immigrating to Canada as a permanent resident and subsequently being granted citizenship.

An unintended consequence of the new rules has been the statelessness of children of Canadian expats, if the parents were also born outside Canada and gave birth in a country which does not practice unrestricted jus soli.

=== 2010s revocation of Canadian citizenship ===
On 19 July 2011, through Immigration Minister Jason Kenney, the Canadian Government announced its intention to revoke the citizenship of 1,800 people whom it believed obtained their status through fraudulent means. Targets of the move were predicted to hail predominantly from the Middle East, Persian Gulf, and China.

On 9 September 2012, the government raised this number to 3,100 and began sending letters detailing the revocation and appeal process. The following year's Immigration Minister, Chris Alexander, announced that 27 of the investigations had led to revoked citizenships. This represents the largest-ever revocation of Canadian citizenships. In comparison, fewer than 70 citizenships were revoked between the passing of the Citizenship Act in 1947 and 2011.

== See also ==
- Immigration to Canada
- Economic impact of immigration to Canada
- Oath of Citizenship (Canada)
- Free-rider problem
- Multiple citizenship
- Expatriate
- Right of Return
