= History of Canadian nationality law =

History of citizenship in Canada

The history of Canadian nationality law dates back over three centuries, and has evolved considerably over that time.

During the early colonial period, residents of the French colonies were French subjects, governed by French nationality law, while residents of British colonies were British subjects, governed by British law. Prior to Confederation in 1867, the residents of the various provinces of British North America were British subjects, governed primarily by British law.

After Confederation, as Canada evolved to full nationhood, it gradually enacted laws relating to rights of domicile and entry to Canada, although Canadians continued to be British subjects under British law.

In 1946, the federal Parliament enacted the Canadian Citizenship Act, 1946, which created fully independent Canadian citizenship, separate from British law and status as British subjects. That Act came into force on January 1, 1947, and remained in force for thirty years. It conferred citizenship in different ways, by birth in Canada, birth to a Canadian parent, and by naturalisation. Since 1977, Canadian nationality has been regulated by the Citizenship Act, enacted in 1976 and brought into force in 1977.

The Canadian Citizenship Act, 1946 imposed restrictions on multiple citizenship. The current Canadian Citizenship Act does not restrict multiple citizenship.

== Background ==
Canada became a French possession in 1663 and Louis XIV established that the laws and ordinances of France governed the territory. The Ancien Régime of France developed a system of feudal allegiance in which subjects were bound together by a scheme of protection and service tied to land ownership. Possession of land was typically tied to military and court service and omitted women because they could not perform those obligations. Thus, French nationality also derived from place of birth in French territory, until the nineteenth century, but under feudal law married women were subjugated to the authority of their husbands under coverture.

In 1763, at the end of the Seven Years' War under the terms of the Treaty of Paris, Canada was transferred to British control and converted to the laws of Britain. For a decade, English Common Law defined civil status in the territory. In Britain, allegiance, in which subjects pledged to support a monarch, was the precursor to the modern concept of nationality. The crown recognised from 1350 that all persons born within the territories of the British Empire were British subjects. Those born outside the realm — except children of those serving in an official post abroad, children of the monarch, and children born on a British sailing vessel — were considered by common law to be foreigners. Marriage did not affect the status of a subject of the realm, except that under common law, single women, including divorcées, were not allowed to be parents thus their children could not derive nationality maternally and were stateless unless legitimated by their father.

Nationality acts passed in Britain did not extend beyond the bounds of the United Kingdom of Great Britain and Ireland. Other than common law, there was no standard statutory law which applied for subjects throughout the realm, meaning different jurisdictions created their own legislation for local conditions, which often conflicted with the laws in other jurisdictions in the empire. Thus, a person who was naturalised in Canada, for example, would be considered a foreigner, rather than a British national, in Australia or South Africa. The Quebec Act 1774 restored French civil law in the territory of Quebec. The Constitution of 1791 divided Canada into two provinces and reaffirmed that Quebec, known as Lower Canada, was to retain French law as it existed up to 1763, while English law would be applicable in Upper Canada.

In 1849, Upper Canada passed a statute to bring its law into line with the British Naturalization Act 1844, requiring foreign women to automatically derive their nationality from their spouse. In 1866, the Civil Code of Lower Canada was drafted to modernize and codify the legal system in place for Lower Canada, creating a coherent compilation of the various laws in effect in the territory in both English and French. Under the terms of the Code, foreign women automatically acquired the nationality of their spouse upon marriage. Married women were legally incapacitated and subject to their husband's authority. They were also required to share his domicile, which under French law is tied to the place from which one derives their civil rights.

== Imperial and federal legislation, 1868–1914 ==
Upon passage of the British North America Act, 1867, the Parliament of Canada was given authority over "Naturalization and Aliens", by virtue of section 91(25).

Aliens and Naturalization Act
- Long title: An Act respecting Aliens and Naturalization
- Citation: S.C. 1868, c. 66
- Assented to: 22 May 1868

Repealed by
- Naturalization and Aliens Act, 1881
- Status: Repealed

The Aliens and Naturalization Act, 1868 was the first federal Act to be passed, and it provided that persons who had been previously naturalized in any part of the Dominion possessed the same status as anyone naturalized under that Act. In addition:

- Aliens could apply for naturalization after three years' residence in Canada.
- Alien-born women became naturalized by marriage to a natural-born subject or to a husband naturalized under the Act.
- The laws in Nova Scotia and the former Province of Canada that allowed aliens to hold property were kept in force.

The 1868 Act was replaced by the Naturalization and Aliens Act, 1881, which came into force on 4 July 1883. It made the rules allowing aliens to hold property uniform throughout the Dominion, and otherwise standardized the law along the same lines as the Naturalization Act 1870 of the United Kingdom. It also provided that Canadian women automatically derived their nationality upon marriage from their husbands.

From the late nineteenth century, English or Anglo-Canadians viewed their nation as a white, British society; whereas, those in Quebec identified as nationals of Canada, with unique ties to French culture and Catholicism. The policies adopted for immigrants, and indigenous peoples, were aimed to include those who could quickly assimilate into the mainstream culture and exclude those who could not. In 1885, the government passed the Chinese Immigration Act, requiring payment of a $50 head tax for all Chinese immigrants. In 1907, an agreement was reached with Japan to restrict emigration to 400 persons per year and only allow contract labourers who had been government-approved, domestic workers for Japanese families, and persons who had been previous residents to enter Canada. With increasing Indian/South Asian (primarily Punjabi Sikh) immigration to Canada between 1897 and 1907, the Continuous journey regulation was passed in 1908 to prevent Asian immigrants from entering Canada unless they arrived from their birth country; since there was no direct route to Canada from India, the law effectively barred Indian immigration.

From 1869 to 1985, First Nations women in Canada who were Status Indians under the Indian Act were required to follow the status of their husband. This meant primarily that if they married a person who was not a Status Indian, they lost their Indian status. Likewise, being a Status Indian person was described in law until 1951, as a male person who had native blood with a tribal affiliation. His children or legal wife derived their Indian status from their father or husband.

== Canadian citizens and Canadian nationals, 1910–1947 ==
Immigration Act, 1910
- Long title: An Act respecting Immigration
- Citation: S.C. 1910, c. 27
- Assented to: 4 May 1910
- Status: Repealed

The status of "Canadian citizen" was first created under the Immigration Act, 1910, which included anyone who was:

1. a person born in Canada who had not become an alien;
2. a British subject possessing Canadian domicile; and
3. a person naturalized under the laws of Canada who had not subsequently become an alien or lost Canadian domicile.

Aliens, as well as all other British subjects, who wished to immigrate to Canada required permission to land. "Domicile" was declared to have been acquired by a person having his domicile in Canada for three years after having been landed therein, excluding any time spent in "any penitentiary, jail, reformatory, prison, or asylum for the insane in Canada."

Although the terms "Canadian citizen" and indeed "Canadian citizenship" were used in this Act, they did not create the legal status of Canadian citizen in a nationality sense. People who had the status of "Canadian citizen" were merely free from immigration controls.

Naturalization Act, 1914
- Long title: An Act respecting British Nationality, Naturalization and Aliens
- Citation: S.C. 1914, c. 44
- Assented to: 12 June 1914

Repealed by
- Canadian Nationals Act, 1921
- Status: Repealed

In 1911, at the Imperial Conference a decision was made to draft a common nationality code defining British nationals for use across the empire. The status of all British subjects in the Empire (whether by birth or naturalization) was standardized by the British Nationality and Status of Aliens Act 1914, which was adopted in Canada by the Naturalization Act, 1914. The uniform law, which went into effect on 1 January 1915, required a married woman to derive her nationality from her spouse, meaning if he was British, she was also, and if he was foreign, so was she. It stipulated that upon loss of nationality of a husband, a wife could declare that she wished to remain British and provided that if a marriage had terminated, through death or divorce, a British-born national who had lost her status through marriage could reacquire British nationality through naturalisation without meeting a residency requirement. The statute reiterated common law provisions for natural-born persons born within the realm on or after the effective date. By using the word person, the statute nullified legitimacy requirements for jus soli nationals. For those born abroad on or after the effective date, legitimacy was still required, and could only be derived by a child from a British father (one generation), who was natural-born or naturalised. Naturalisations required five years residence or service to the crown.

By 1918, the rise of women's suffrage motivated new federal interest in the question of women's nationality, but the country's legislative ability to change its nationality laws was limited by the common code for Dominions of Britain that required legal changes to be unanimous among all member countries. In 1919, women were successful in lobbying for foreign women to be able to naturalise independently of their spouse in Canada, but by law they were still required to have the same nationality as their husband in the empire.

Canadian Nationals Act, 1921
- Long title: An Act to define Canadian Nationals and to provide for the Renunciation of Canadian Nationality
- Citation: S.C. 1921, c. 4
- Assented to: 3 May 1921
- Status: Repealed

A separate status of "Canadian national" was created under the Canadian Nationals Act, 1921, which was defined as being any British subject who was a Canadian citizen as defined above, the wife of any such citizen, and any person born outside Canada whose father was a Canadian national at the time of that person's birth.

Canada later passed the Chinese Immigration Act, 1923 on June 30, 1923, which barred Chinese immigration except for a very restricted group of diplomats, merchants, missionaries, students and returning residents. In 1928, the Japanese government agreed to amend their emigration agreement, limiting immigration to Canada to 150 persons annually. After the World Conference on the Codification of International Law held in The Hague in 1930, Canada became the first Commonwealth country to modify its laws to conform with the provisions to prevent statelessness in the Convention on Certain Questions Relating to the Conflict of Nationality Laws. In 1931, under the government of R. B. Bennett the Nationality Act was reformed to prevent women from losing their nationality through marriage if they would be rendered stateless. The amendment also introduced the concept of consent, meaning that alien women did not automatically derive the nationality of a spouse, but could obtain his nationality if they requested it within six months of his change of status.

Once ratified, the 1931 Statute of Westminster gave the Dominions the ability to govern independently on behalf of their constituents, rather than implementing governance on behalf of the British crown. This allowed Commonwealth members to define members of their own communities separately from that which defined British subjects, opening the door to nationality in member states of the realm. Because of this Canadians, and others living in countries that became known as Commonwealth realms, were known as subjects of the Crown. However in legal documents the term "British subject" continued to be used.

Prior to 1947, Canada issued two types of passports:

1. those to British subjects by birth (coloured blue), and
2. those to naturalized British subjects or citizens (coloured red).

=== Eligibility of married women ===
There were complex rules for determining whether married women qualified as British subjects. Until 14 January 1932, the rule was that the wife of a British subject was deemed to be a British subject as well, and the wife of an alien was deemed to be an alien. After that date, and until 31 December 1946, the rules were generally as follows:

- At time of marriage:
  - If husband was a British subject → then wife automatically became a British subject on marriage.
  - If husband was an alien → then wife only ceased to be a British subject if she automatically acquired her husband's alien nationality upon marriage.
- During the marriage:
  - If husband naturalized as a British subject → then wife must apply to become a British subject and obtain a Series H certificate.
  - If husband naturalized in a foreign country → then wife's status changed only if she was automatically included in her husband's alien naturalization. However, she could apply to retain British subject status and be issued a Series I certificate.

=== World War II-era war brides ===
By marrying a Canadian soldier, a woman, if not already British, acquired the status of British subject and Canadian national. If she then landed in Canada, she became a British subject of Canadian domicile.

In addition, Order in Council P.C. 7318 of 21 September 1944 stated:

2. Every dependent applying for admission to Canada shall be permitted to enter Canada and upon such admission be deemed to have landed within the meaning of the said Act; and where the member of the Canadian Armed Forces is either a Canadian citizen or has Canadian domicile, the dependent shall, upon being landed, be deemed to have acquired the same status for the purposes of the said Act.

This was later replaced by P.C. 858 of February 9, 1945, which declared:

2. Every dependent applying for admission to Canada shall be permitted to enter Canada and upon such admission shall be deemed to have landed within the meaning of Canadian immigration law.

3. Every dependent who is permitted to enter Canada pursuant to section two of this Order shall for the purpose of Canadian immigration law be deemed to be a Canadian citizen if the member of the forces upon whom he is dependent is a Canadian citizen and shall be deemed to have Canadian domicile if the said member has Canadian domicile.

On May 15, 1947, P.C. 858 was replaced with an amendment to the Immigration Act, which provided that, subject to medical examination, war brides and children of Canadian servicemen, who were still in Europe, were automatically entitled to admission and landing in Canada.

== Canadian Citizenship Act, 1946 ==
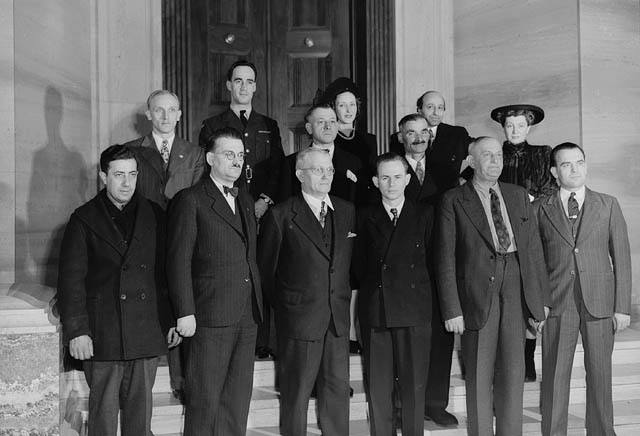
First Canadian Citizenship ceremony on January 3, 1947 in Ottawa.

Canadian citizenship, as a status separate from British nationality, was created by the Canadian Citizenship Act, 1946 (popularly known as the 1947 Act), which came into effect on 1 January 1947. The Act meant that nationals in Canada were finally described as Canadian, rather than British, and it also granted married women greater choice over their own nationality status. The law redefined the order of nationality, stipulating that Canadians were nationals of Canada first and only secondarily nationals of Britain. This served as a catalyst to restructure the nationality laws throughout Britain. Under its terms, anyone born in Canada would now automatically be granted Canadian nationality, and marriage to a non-Canadian spouse would no longer strip a Canadian woman of her nationality. The Act permitted Canadian men to have Canadian nationality granted to children born outside the country, but Canadian women could only apply to do the same if their children had been born out of wedlock. Canadian citizenship was generally conferred immediately on the following persons:

- a person who was born in Canada (or on a Canadian ship) on or before January 1, 1947, and had not become an alien before January 1, 1947;
- a person other than a natural-born Canadian citizen:
  - who was granted, or whose name was included in, a certificate of naturalization under any act of the Parliament of Canada and had not become an alien at the commencement of the Act, or
  - who was a British subject who had acquired Canadian domicile (i.e. five years' residence in Canada as a landed immigrant) before 1947;
- a British subject who lived in Canada for 20 years immediately before 1947 and was not, on 1 January 1947, under order of deportation;
- women who were married to a Canadian before 1947 and who entered Canada as a landed immigrant before 1947;
- children born outside Canada to a Canadian father (or mother, if born out of wedlock) before 1947.

In the latter two cases, a "Canadian" was a British subject who would have been considered a Canadian citizen if the 1947 Act had come into force immediately before the marriage or birth (as the case may be). Where the child born outside Canada was not a minor (i.e. was not under 21 years in age) at the time the Act came into force, proof of landed immigrant status was required to confirm Canadian citizenship.

=== Acquisition and loss of citizenship ===
In addition to those people who became Canadian citizens upon the coming into force of the Act, citizenship afterwards was generally acquired as follows:

- birth in Canada
- naturalization in Canada after five years' residence as a landed immigrant
- grant of citizenship to a foreign woman married to a Canadian man after one year's residence as a landed immigrant
- grant of citizenship to women who lost British subject status prior to 1947 upon marriage to a foreign man or his subsequent naturalization
- registration of a child born outside Canada to a Canadian "responsible parent" (being the father, if the child was born in wedlock, or the mother, if the child was born out of wedlock and was residing with the mother, if the father was deceased or if custody of the child had been awarded to the mother by court order)

Loss of Canadian citizenship generally occurred in the following cases:

- naturalization outside Canada
- in the case of a minor, naturalization of a parent
- service in foreign armed forces
- naturalized Canadians who lived outside Canada for 10 years and did not file a declaration of retention
- where a Canadian had acquired that status by descent from a Canadian parent, and who was either not lawfully admitted to Canada for permanent residence on the commencement of the Act or was born outside Canada afterwards, loss of citizenship could occur on the person's 22nd birthday unless the person had filed a declaration of retention between their 21st and 22nd birthday and renounced any previous nationality they possessed.

Although Canada restricted dual citizenship between 1947 and 1977, there were some situations where Canadians could nevertheless legally possess another citizenship. For example, migrants becoming Canadian citizens were not asked to formally prove that they had ceased to hold the nationality of their former country. Similarly children born in Canada to non-Canadian parents were not under any obligation to renounce a foreign citizenship they had acquired by descent. Holding a foreign passport did not in itself cause loss of Canadian citizenship.

=== Impact ===
The Canadian Citizenship Act replaced the following phrases throughout all federal legislation:

- "natural-born British subject" became "natural-born Canadian citizen"
- "naturalized British subject" became "Canadian citizen other than a natural-born Canadian citizen"
- "Canadian national" became "Canadian citizen"

The Citizenship Act of 1946 did not contain provisions to automatically repatriate Canadian women who had lost their nationality before 1 January 1947. This meant that between two and three thousand women, who married allies of Britain during the Second World War, in Canada or overseas, were still deprived of their original nationality. To recover their nationality, women were required to obtain permanent residency through family sponsorship, meet medical and suitability requirements, and apply to be naturalised after living in Canada for a year. They were also required to take an oath of allegiance if they were approved. The Citizenship Act of 1946 also made no mention of First Nations people.

An Act passed later in 1946 amended the Immigration Act, in order to specify that a "Canadian citizen" was one as defined in The Canadian Citizenship Act.

These amendments would lead to later jurisprudence that addressed a transition that was problematic in certain cases. Although the 1946 Act did not deprive any Canadian national of such status, being a Canadian national did not automatically confer Canadian citizenship, as the Act represented a complete code for defining such status. The Act together with later retroactive amendments in 1953, had significant effects upon children of war brides. As Canadian soldiers fathered some 30,000 war children in Europe (including 22,000 in Britain and 6,000–7,000 in the Netherlands), of which a great number were born out of wedlock, the Act's provisions had differing impacts depending on how they were born:

Status of children born to war brides outside Canada under The Canadian Citizenship Act (1946), as at January 1, 1947 (Note: who were minors on the day the Act came into force)
How citizenship is acquired	Status	Citizen?	Subject to automatic revocation?
Natural-born (Note: An Act to amend The Canadian Citizenship Act, S.C. 1952–53, c. 23, s. 2)	Born in wedlock	Yes (Note: where the father was a natural-born Canadian citizen, a British subject with Canadian domicile, had acquired citizenship by naturalization, or had had his domicile in Canada for the 20 years immediately before January 1, 1947)	No
Natural-born	Born out of wedlock	Yes (Note: where the mother was a natural-born Canadian citizen, a British subject with Canadian domicile, had acquired citizenship by naturalization, or had had her domicile in Canada for the 20 years immediately before January 1, 1947)	citizenship could be revoked on the 24th birthday, except where Canadian domicile had been established by the 21st birthday, or a declaration of retention of citizenship was filed during the three years prior to the 24th birthday; where the citizen (and spouse, where applicable) has resided outside of Canada for ten consecutive years, except when in military service or other specified reasons (Note: in the public service; being a representative of a Canadian company or international organization; or who is away because of ill health or disability (S.C. 1952–53, c. 23, s. 8))
Other than natural-born (Note: S.C. 1952–53, c. 23, s. 5)	Born out of wedlock	Yes (Note: before 1947, deemed to be a British subject with Canadian domicile upon landing (P.C. 858, confirmed in Taylor (FCA), at par. 74), and thus becoming a Canadian citizen on the date the Act came into force (provided that domicile still existed); after that date, only where the Minister grants a special certificate to the child, lawfully admitted to Canada for permanent residence, whose responsible parent has already been granted a certificate of citizenship (S.C. 1946, c. 15, s. 10(3)))	citizenship could be revoked on the 24th birthday, except where Canadian domicile had been established by the 21st birthday, or a declaration of retention of citizenship was filed during the three years prior to the 24th birthday; where the citizen (and spouse, where applicable) has resided outside of Canada for ten consecutive years, except when in military service or other specified reasons
1. who were minors on the day the Act came into force 2. An Act to amend The Canadian Citizenship Act, S.C. 1952–53, c. 23, s. 2; 3. where the father was a natural-born Canadian citizen, a British subject with Canadian domicile, had acquired citizenship by naturalization, or had had his domicile in Canada for the 20 years immediately before January 1, 1947; 4. where the mother was a natural-born Canadian citizen, a British subject with Canadian domicile, had acquired citizenship by naturalization, or had had her domicile in Canada for the 20 years immediately before January 1, 1947; 5. in the public service; being a representative of a Canadian company or international organization; or who is away because of ill health or disability (S.C. 1952–53, c. 23, s. 8); 6. S.C. 1952–53, c. 23, s. 5; 7. before 1947, deemed to be a British subject with Canadian domicile upon landing (P.C. 858, confirmed in Taylor (FCA), at par. 74), and thus becoming a Canadian citizen on the date the Act came into force (provided that domicile still existed); after that date, only where the Minister grants a special certificate to the child, lawfully admitted to Canada for permanent residence, whose responsible parent has already been granted a certificate of citizenship (S.C. 1946, c. 15, s. 10(3))

In 1947, the Chinese Exclusion Act ended, but was replaced by an act which limited immigration to the spouses and minor unmarried children of Chinese and other Asian persons who already had Canadian nationality. In 1950, an amendment to the Citizenship Act removed the one-year residency requirement for repatriation of married women, but still required them to apply for naturalisation. It also allowed foreign husbands of Canadian nationals and minor children to be admitted for immigration.

=== Extensions of citizenship ===
- The Dominion of Newfoundland joined Confederation on 31 March 1949, and British subjects in Newfoundland acquired Canadian citizenship on broadly similar terms to those applying in the rest of Canada since 1947.
- In 1956, Parliament amended the Citizenship Act to retroactively grant citizenship to a small group of First Nations and Inuit who had entered Canada from Alaska at some point before 1947 but had not made formal application to enter Canada. The amendment provided that anyone who was defined as "Indians" (First Nations) or "Eskimos" (Inuit), and who were not natural-born citizens, but were domiciled in Canada on 1 January 1947, and had been resident in Canada for ten years as at 1 January 1956, were granted citizenship retroactive to January 1, 1947.

=== 1967 amendment ===
The rule relating to loss of citizenship by naturalized Canadians living outside Canada for more than ten years was repealed on 7 July 1967, with provision made for such loss to be reversed through a petition for resumption of citizenship. Immigration restrictions based on race and national origin were removed from Canadian legislation in 1967.

== Citizenship Act, 1976 ==
Citizenship Act
- Long title: An Act respecting citizenship
- Citation: R.S.C., 1985, c. C-29
- Commenced: 15 February 1977

Repeals
- Canadian Citizenship Act, 1946

Amended by
- An Act to amend the Citizenship Act (S.C. 2008, c. 14); Strengthening Canadian Citizenship Act (S.C. 2014, c. 22)
- Status: Amended

Citizenship law was reformed by the Citizenship Act, 1976 (popularly known as the 1977 Act), which came into force on 15 February 1977. Under its provisions, children who were legitimate or adopted were allowed for the first time to derive nationality from their Canadian mother. Canada removed restrictions on dual citizenship, and many of the provisions to acquire or lose Canadian citizenship that existed under the 1947 Act were repealed.

Under the new Act, Canadian citizenship is acquired by:

- birth in Canada (except where neither parent is a citizen or permanent resident and either parent is a representative of a foreign government, their employee, or anyone granted diplomatic privileges or immunities)
- birth outside Canada to a Canadian parent
- grant after three years' residence in Canada
- notification in the case of a woman who lost British subject status by marriage before 1947
- delayed registration of a foreign birth under the Act before 15 February 1977 (This provision was repealed on 14 August 2004.)

Canadian citizens are in general no longer subject to involuntary loss of citizenship, barring revocation on the grounds of:

- false representation,
- fraud, or
- knowingly concealing material circumstances.

Section 8 of the Act provides that Canadians born outside Canada, to a Canadian parent who also acquired Canadian citizenship by birth outside Canada to a Canadian parent, will lose Canadian citizenship at age 28 unless they have established specific ties to Canada and applied to retain Canadian citizenship. Children born outside Canada to naturalized Canadian citizens are not subject to the section 8 provisions, nor is anyone born before 15 February 1977.

=== Amendments ===
==== 2009 ====
On 17 April 2008, An Act to amend the Citizenship Act received Royal assent, coming into force one year later.

Among the changes made:

- There is no longer a requirement to apply to maintain citizenship.
- Individuals can now only become Canadian citizens by descent if one of their parents was either a native-born citizen of Canada or a foreign-born but naturalized citizen of Canada. This effectively limits citizenship by descent to one generation born outside Canada. Such an individual might even be stateless if he or she has no claim to any other citizenship. (Note: This situation has already occurred at least twice. In one situation, Rachel Chandler was born in China to a father who is a Canadian citizen born in Libya and a mother who is a Chinese citizen. Due to the nationality laws of Canada and China, she was not eligible for citizenship of either country, but, as her paternal grandfather was Irish-born, she acquired Irish citizenship. Another situation occurred to Chloé Goldring who was born in Belgium to a Canadian father born in Bermuda and an Algerian mother. Due to the nationality laws of Belgium, Canada and Algeria, she was not eligible for citizenship of any of those countries and was born stateless. Chloé Goldring was subsequently granted Canadian citizenship.)
- The second generation born abroad can only gain Canadian citizenship by immigrating to Canada – this can be done by their Canadian citizen parents sponsoring them as dependent children, which is a category with fewer requirements and would take less time than most other immigration application categories.
- Foreign-born citizens being adopted in a foreign country by Canadian citizens can now acquire Canadian citizenship immediately upon completion of the adoption, without first entering Canada as a permanent resident, as was the case under the previous rules.

Provision was also made for the reinstatement of Canadian citizenship to those:

- who became citizens when the first citizenship act took effect on 1 January 1947 (including people born in Canada prior to 1947 and war brides) and who then lost their citizenship;
- who were born in Canada or had become a Canadian citizen on or after 1 January 1947, and had then lost citizenship; or
- who were born abroad to a Canadian citizen parent on or after 1 January 1947, if not already a citizen, but only if they were the first generation born abroad.

==== 2014 ====
The Strengthening Canadian Citizenship Act received royal assent on 19 June 2014. Several provisions had retroactive effect to 17 April 2009, in order to correct certain situations that arose from the 2009 amendments, with the remainder coming into effect on 1 August 2014, 28 May 2015, and 11 June 2015.

Among the Act's significant changes:

- Citizenship was granted retroactively to those individuals who were born or naturalized in Canada as well as to those who were British subjects residing in Canada prior to 1947 (or prior to April 1949, in the case of Newfoundland) who were not eligible for Canadian citizenship when the first Canadian Citizenship Act took effect.
- The required residence prior to application for citizenship was lengthened to four years (1,460 days) out of the previous six years, with 183 days minimum of physical presence in four out of six years. Residency is defined as physical presence.
- Adult applicants must file Canadian income tax returns, as required under the Income Tax Act, to be eligible for citizenship.
- Time spent in Canada before being granted Permanent Resident status does not apply towards the residency period
- A fast-track mechanism for citizenship was established for permanent residents serving with—and individuals on exchange with—the Canadian Armed Forces to honour their service to Canada.
- Knowledge and language requirements were unchanged, except that the knowledge test must be taken in English or French.
- Authority was provided for revoking or denying citizenship in specified circumstances.
- Provision was made for the regulation of consultants, as well as for certain anti-fraud measures.

==== 2017 ====
On February 25, 2016, as a consequence of the Liberal victory in the 2015 election, An Act to amend the Citizenship Act and to make consequential amendments to another Act was passed on June 19, 2017. Most provisions took effect upon Royal Assent, with the remainder coming into force on October 11, 2017 January 24, 2018 and December 5, 2018.

The Act provided for the following changes:

- The period required for physical presence in Canada was reduced from 1,460 days over six years to a total of 1,095 days over the five years immediately prior to submitting an application for citizenship.
- The requirement that a person intend to reside in Canada if granted citizenship was repealed.
- The adult maximum age limit applicable for the requirements to demonstrate adequate knowledge of one of the official languages is now applicable to those under 55 years of age, rather than by those under 65.
- The requirement to file income tax returns was clarified, so that persons must provide such returns for three years within the five-year period before applying for citizenship.
- "Statelessness" was added to the available grounds for the Minister to exercise his or her discretion in granting citizenship to any person "to alleviate cases of special and unusual hardship or to reward services of an exceptional value to Canada."
- The prohibition on receiving a grant of citizenship, or taking the citizenship oath, while serving a term of imprisonment was broadened to include being held under any form of incarceration.
- The power to revoke citizenship on grounds of national security was repealed.
- The provision specifying that a person whose citizenship is revoked reverts to being a foreign national was amended to provide that the person's status reverts to that of a permanent resident.
- The Minister was granted the power to seize or detain any document submitted for the purposes of the Act if there are reasonable grounds to believe the document was fraudulently or improperly obtained or used.
- Transitional provisions provided for certain of the 2014 amendments to be deemed to have never had effect.

==== 2025 ====
In 2023, the Ontario Superior Court of Justice found the first-generation limit to citizenship by descent unconstitutional. The rule was deemed to have violated Charter rights of citizens born abroad, as it did not grant the same rights to citizens based on where they had been born. The Liberal government decided to not challenge the ruling, and was required by the court to grant citizenship to those impacted by the first-generation limit. Initially requiring the Government to pass remedial legislation by June 20, 2024, the court granted multiple extensions, with the final deadline being January 20, 2026. The Parliament of Canada passed An Act to amend the Citizenship Act (2025), which received Royal Assent on November 20, 2025, and came into force on December 15, 2025. Implementing regulations also took effect on that date.

The key changes were as follows:

1. Citizenship by descent is extended to all people born before December 15, 2025, beyond the first generation. For those who had not already acquired citizenship under other provisions of the Act, there is the option of renouncing the automatic acquisition of citizenship.
2. People adopted abroad before December 15, 2025, by a Canadian parent born or adopted abroad can apply for Canadian citizenship.
3. People born or adopted abroad on or after December 15, 2025, to a Canadian parent also born or adopted abroad must demonstrate that their Canadian parent has spent three years in Canada when applying for proof of Canadian citizenship, or applying for Canadian citizenship for an adopted child. "Three years" is considered to be 1,095 days of cumulative physical presence in Canada before the applicant’s birth or adoption.

The expansion of eligibility for citizenship for those born before December 15, 2025, is expected to have several knock-on effects:

1. The total number eligible is not fully known, although the majority would most likely be from the United States.
2. Many high-profile figures could apply, including Hillary Clinton, Madonna, Angelina Jolie and Viggo Mortensen.
3. There could be a wave of applications to renounce newly granted citizenship from nationals of countries that do not recognize dual citizenship, such as China, India, Japan and Saudi Arabia.

== Judicial review of Citizenship Act provisions ==
=== Definition of "residence requirement" ===
There have been several court decisions dealing with the subject of Canadian citizenship. In particular, the interpretation of the 3-year (1,095-day) residence requirement enacted by the 1977 Citizenship Act, which does not define the term "residence" and, further, prohibits an appeal of a Federal Court decision in a citizenship matter to the Federal Court of Appeal or the Supreme Court, has "led to a great deal of mischief and agony" and generated considerable judicial controversy.

Over the years two principal schools of thought for residence have emerged from the Federal Court.

Early on, Associate Chief Justice Arthur L. Thurlow in Papadogiorgakis (Re), [1978] 2 F.C. 208, opined that residency entails more than a mere counting of days. He held that residency is a matter of the degree to which a person, in mind or fact, settles into or maintains or centralizes their ordinary mode of living, including social relations, interests, and conveniences. The question becomes whether an applicant's linkages suggest that Canada is their home, regardless of any absences from the country.

In Re Koo, Justice Barbara Reed further elaborated that in residency cases the question before the Court is whether Canada is the country in which an applicant has centralized their mode of existence. Resolving such a question involves consideration of several factors:

1. Was the individual physically present in Canada for a long period before recent absences which occurred immediately before the application for citizenship?
2. Where are the applicant's immediate family and dependents (and extended family) residents?
3. Does the pattern of physical presence in Canada indicate a returning home or merely visiting the country?
4. What is the extent of the physical absences—if an applicant is only a few days short of the 1095-day total it is easier to find deemed residence than if those absences are extensive?
5. Is the physical absence caused by a clearly temporary situation such as employment as a missionary abroad, following a course of study abroad as a student, accepting temporary employment abroad, accompanying a spouse who has accepted temporary employment abroad?
6. What is the quality of the connection with Canada: is it more substantial than that which exists with any other country?

The general principle is that the quality of residence in Canada must be more substantial than elsewhere.

In contrast, a line of jurisprudence flowing from the decision in Re Pourghasemi (1993), 62 F.T.R. 122, 19 Imm. L.R. (2d) 259, emphasized how important it is for a potential new citizen to be immersed in Canadian society and that a person cannot reside in a place where the person is not physically present. Thus, a potential citizen must establish that they have been physically present in Canada for the requisite period of time.

In the words of Justice Francis Muldoon:

It is clear that the purpose of paragraph 5(1)(c) is to ensure that everyone who is granted precious Canadian citizenship has become, or at least has been compulsorily presented with the everyday opportunity to become "Canadianized." This happens by "rubbing elbows" with Canadians in shopping malls, corner stores, libraries, concert halls, auto repair shops, pubs, cabarets, elevators, churches, synagogues, mosques, and temples – in a world wherever one can meet and converse with Canadians – during the prescribed three years. One can observe Canadian society for all its virtues, decadence, values, dangers, and freedoms, just as it is. That is little enough time in which to become Canadianized. If a citizenship candidate misses that qualifying experience, then Canadian citizenship can be conferred, in effect, on a person who is still a foreigner in experience, social adaptation, and often in thought and outlook... So those who would throw in their lot with Canadians by becoming citizens must first throw in their lot with Canadians by residing among Canadians, in Canada, during three of the preceding four years, to Canadianize themselves. It is not something one can do while abroad, for Canadian life and society exist only in Canada and nowhere else.

The co-existence of such disparate, yet equally valid approaches has led some judges to comment that:

- the "[citizenship] law is in a sorry state";
- "there cannot be two correct interpretations of a statute";
- "it does not engender confidence in the system for conferring citizenship if an applicant is, in the course of a single application, subjected to different legal tests because of the differing legal views of the Citizenship Court";
- there is a "scandalous incertitude in the law"; and that
- "there is no doubt that a review of the citizenship decisions of this Court, on that issue, demonstrates that the process of gaining citizenship in such circumstances is akin to a lottery".

In 2010, it seemed that a relative judicial consensus for decision-making in residence cases might emerge. In several Federal Court decisions it was held that the citizenship judge must apply a hybrid two-test approach by firstly ascertaining whether, on the balance of probabilities, the applicant has accumulated 1,095 days of physical presence. If so, the residency requirement is considered to have been met. If not, then the judge must additionally assess the application under the "centralized mode of existence" approach, guided by the non-exhaustive factors set out in Koo (Re).

However, most recently, this compromise formula was rejected by Federal Court judges, with some judges commenting on the need for legislation to resolve the issue.

=== Other significant cases ===
Case	Source	Description
Glynos v. Canada,* 1992		The Federal Court of Appeal ruled that the child of a Canadian mother had the right to be granted Canadian citizenship, despite one of the parents responsible (i.e. the father) having been naturalized as a U.S. citizen before 15 February 1977 and thus renouncing his Canadian citizenship.
Benner v. Canada (Secretary of State), 1997		The Supreme Court ruled that children born of Canadian mothers abroad prior to 15 February 1977 were to be treated the same as those of Canadian fathers (i.e., granted citizenship upon application without the requirements of a security check or Oath of Citizenship).
Canada (Attorney General) v. McKenna, 1998		The Federal Court of Appeal ruled that the Minister must establish a bona fide justification pursuant to s. 15(g) of the Canadian Human Rights Act regarding the discriminatory practice on adoptive parentage. More specifically, a child born abroad to Canadian citizens would obtain "automatic" citizenship whereas a child adopted abroad must gain admission to Canada as permanent residents, as mandated by paragraph 5(2)(a) of the Citizenship Act, which incorporates, by reference, the requirements imposed by the Immigration Act pertaining to permanent resident status. However, this case also declared that the Canadian Human Rights Tribunal had (a) overreached itself in declaring that the granting of citizenship was a service customarily available to the general public; and (b) breached the rules of natural justice by failing to notify the Minister that the provisions of the Citizenship Act were being questioned. After the amendment in 2007, most adopted persons now automatically acquire citizenship after the finalization of the adoption, even if the adoption itself took place before the amendment, as the previous ruling is no longer relevant.
Taylor v. Canada,* 2007		In September 2006, the Federal Court had ruled that an individual born abroad and out of wedlock to a Canadian serviceman father and a non-Canadian mother acquired citizenship upon arrival in Canada after World War II without having subsequently lost their citizenship whilst living abroad. In November 2007, this was reversed by the Federal Court of Appeal, holding that the pursuant (Taylor) had lost his Canadian citizenship under s. 20 of the 1947 Act (i.e., absence from Canada for 10 consecutive years), and therefore the court could not grant his request. However, he was now able to request a grant of citizenship under s. 5(4) of the current Act (i.e., special cases). Citizenship was subsequently granted to Taylor in December 2007.
Canada** v. Dufour, 2014		The Federal Court of Appeal ruled that the citizenship officer cannot unreasonably deny a person's citizenship application made under paragraph 5.1(3) if the Quebec government had fully validated the person's adoption. Moreover, in order to render a Quebec adoption as an adoption of convenience, the officer must prove, with tangible evidence, that the Quebec legal system was defrauded by the citizenship applicant. The respondent, Burou Jeanty Dufour, a Haitian citizen who was adopted by a Quebec man, was deemed as an adoptee by convenience. Dufour was thus denied citizenship under paragraph 5.1(3)(b) after a citizenship officer found that (a) his adoption was not approved by the appropriate department within the Haitian government; and (b) Dufour arrived in Canada on a visitor's visa instead of a permanent resident visa, even when his adoption was later approved by a Quebec court. The Court of Appeal believed that the officer had failed to validate the genuineness of the adoption by failing to correspond with the relevant Quebec authorities. Hence, there was no evidence to prove that the adoption was indeed an adoption of convenience.
Canada** v. Kandola, 2014		The Federal Court of Appeal clarified that for a child to be considered a Canadian citizen by descent, a genetic link must be proven to the Canadian parent through a DNA test. In this case, a person who was born to a Canadian citizen father outside of Canada with assisted human reproduction (AHR) technology, but with no genetic links to the father, was declared not to be a Canadian citizen by descent.
Hassouna v. Canada,** 2017		The Federal Court of Canada ruled in a judicial review that s. 10(1), 10(3), and 10(4) of the Act—all regarding revocation of citizenship—violated s. 2(e) of the Canadian Bill of Rights in a way that "[deprived] a person of the right to a fair hearing by the principles of fundamental justice for the determination of his rights and obligations," because those who had their citizenship revoked under these subsections did not have a right to present their cases to the court. All eight applicants' revocation notices were quashed, and the three subsections of the Act are deemed inoperable as of 10 July 2017 after the suspension of the ruling has expired until their formal repeal on 11 January 2018, when revocation is now a matter of the Federal Court, whereafter the Minister can no longer make unilateral decisions.
Vavilov v. Canada,** 2017		The Federal Court of Appeal and, later, the Supreme Court of Canada (SCC) ruled that children born in Canada to a parent who is employed by a foreign government, but is not recognized by Global Affairs Canada as an employee of a foreign government, are Canadian citizens by birth and are not subject to the exceptions under s. 3(2). This would be because only employees of foreign governments with "diplomatic privileges and immunities certified by the Minister of Foreign Affairs" are exempted from the jus soli rule. The appellant, Vavilov, a man who was born in Canada to Russian sleeper agents, was previously declared not to be a Canadian citizen by the Federal Court, as his parents, who were arrested in a 2010 crackdown of Russian agents in the US, were employees of a foreign government at the time of his birth. Moreover, none of his parents were ever Canadian citizens since they only assumed the identities of two deceased Canadians. On 10 May 2018, the federal government's leave to appeal was granted by the SCC, who would examine whether the man and his elder brother, who won a similar case in April that year, would fall under s. 3(2) of the Act. On 19 December 2019, the SCC ruled in Alex and Timothy Vavilov's favour and affirmed their status as Canadian citizens.
Halepota v. Canada,** 2018		The Federal Court ruled that exceptional service to the United Nations (UN) and its agencies is considered as "service of exceptional value to Canada" just as well, due to Canada's UN membership. In this case, a senior-level IRCC decision-maker determined that the appellant, Halepota, a permanent resident and a senior director of the U.N. High Commissioner for Refugees (UNHCR), was ineligible for naturalization under s. 5(4) as she had made no notable contribution to Canada "to grant Canadian citizenship." Though her work was "commendable" and "aligns with Canada’s humanitarian assistance mandate," it was noted that the majority of her work with the UNHCR was done outside of Canada. However, the judge ruled that, due to Canada's commitment to the mandate and goals of the UN, exceptional services to the UN must be considered as exceptional service to Canada for citizenship applications. As a result, the court quashed the decision-maker's decision, and the application was sent to another decision-maker for consideration for the ruling.
Bjorkquist et al. v. Attorney General of Canada, 2023		The Ontario Superior Court of Justice ruled that the first-generation limit on citizenship by descent, created in 2009, to be unconstitutional. The judge noted that the limit created a "a lesser class of citizenship because, unlike Canadian-born citizens, they are unable to pass on Canadian citizenship by descent to their children born abroad", and thus citizens born abroad were deprived of their charter rights. The judge ruled that the government must amend the Citizenship Act to grant citizenship to those impacted by the limit.
*Canada (Minister of Citizenship and Immigration); **Canada (Citizenship and Immigration)

== Canadians, British nationality, and immigration law (1947–1981) ==
The Canadian Citizenship Act, 1976 replaced the term "British subject" with "Commonwealth citizen" in 1977, but the UK did not follow suit until 1 January 1983, when the British Nationality Act 1981 went into effect.

While Canada created Canadian citizenship on 1 January 1947, the British Nationality and Status of Aliens Act 1914 continued to confer British subject status (the only nationality and citizenship status of the United Kingdom and its colonies and dominions before 1949) on Canadians until the British Nationality Act 1948 came into effect on 31 December 1948. That, together with succeeding Acts, changed the nature of Canadian citizenship status as it could apply within the UK:

Class	Act				
Class	British Nationality and Status of Aliens Act 1914	British Nationality Act 1948	Commonwealth Immigrants Act 1962	Immigration Act 1971	British Nationality Act 1981
Canadian citizens under the Canadian Citizenship Act, 1946	Continued to be regarded as British subjects during 1947–1948	If not entitled to become a Citizen of the United Kingdom and Colonies as at 31 December 1948, are still entitled to be British subjects not subject to UK immigration control	non-CUKCs subject to immigration control, if neither born in the UK nor a holder of a UK passport; immigration control later extended by the Commonwealth Immigrants Act 1968 to CUKCs without a UK-born parent or grandparent	the freedom to enter the UK without immigration control is defined as the right of abode, which is restricted to Commonwealth citizens who were "born to or legally adopted by a parent who at the time of the birth or adoption had citizenship of the United Kingdom and Colonies by his birth in the United Kingdom or in any of the Islands", or who were wives (or had been wives) of a CUKC or similarly situated Commonwealth citizen	British subject and Commonwealth citizen are declared to be separate and distinct classes, and British subjects are declared to be Commonwealth citizens; Commonwealth citizens lose the right of abode if they cease to have such citizenship; wives, as a result of marriages occurring after the coming into force of the Act, are no longer able to acquire the right of abode by the fact of such marriage
women from outside the Commonwealth who married Canadian citizens who did not naturalize as Canadian citizens before 1 January 1949.	Continued to be regarded as British subjects during 1947–1948	If not entitled to become CUKCs, then they became "British subjects without citizenship"	non-CUKCs subject to immigration control, if neither born in the UK nor a holder of a UK passport; immigration control later extended by the Commonwealth Immigrants Act 1968 to CUKCs without a UK-born parent or grandparent	the freedom to enter the UK without immigration control is defined as the right of abode, which is restricted to Commonwealth citizens who were "born to or legally adopted by a parent who at the time of the birth or adoption had citizenship of the United Kingdom and Colonies by his birth in the United Kingdom or in any of the Islands", or who were wives (or had been wives) of a CUKC or similarly situated Commonwealth citizen	British subject and Commonwealth citizen are declared to be separate and distinct classes, and British subjects are declared to be Commonwealth citizens; Commonwealth citizens lose the right of abode if they cease to have such citizenship; wives, as a result of marriages occurring after the coming into force of the Act, are no longer able to acquire the right of abode by the fact of such marriage
children born outside Canada to Canadian fathers who were not registered as Canadian citizens before 1 January 1949.	Continued to be regarded as British subjects during 1947–1948	If not entitled to become CUKCs, then they became "British subjects without citizenship"	non-CUKCs subject to immigration control, if neither born in the UK nor a holder of a UK passport; immigration control later extended by the Commonwealth Immigrants Act 1968 to CUKCs without a UK-born parent or grandparent	the freedom to enter the UK without immigration control is defined as the right of abode, which is restricted to Commonwealth citizens who were "born to or legally adopted by a parent who at the time of the birth or adoption had citizenship of the United Kingdom and Colonies by his birth in the United Kingdom or in any of the Islands", or who were wives (or had been wives) of a CUKC or similarly situated Commonwealth citizen	British subject and Commonwealth citizen are declared to be separate and distinct classes, and British subjects are declared to be Commonwealth citizens; Commonwealth citizens lose the right of abode if they cease to have such citizenship; wives, as a result of marriages occurring after the coming into force of the Act, are no longer able to acquire the right of abode by the fact of such marriage
children born outside Canada to Canadian fathers where the child was born before 1926 (hence aged over 21 on 1 January 1947) and had not been admitted to Canada as a landed immigrant before 1947.	Continued to be regarded as British subjects during 1947–1948	If not entitled to become CUKCs, then they became "British subjects without citizenship"	non-CUKCs subject to immigration control, if neither born in the UK nor a holder of a UK passport; immigration control later extended by the Commonwealth Immigrants Act 1968 to CUKCs without a UK-born parent or grandparent	the freedom to enter the UK without immigration control is defined as the right of abode, which is restricted to Commonwealth citizens who were "born to or legally adopted by a parent who at the time of the birth or adoption had citizenship of the United Kingdom and Colonies by his birth in the United Kingdom or in any of the Islands", or who were wives (or had been wives) of a CUKC or similarly situated Commonwealth citizen	British subject and Commonwealth citizen are declared to be separate and distinct classes, and British subjects are declared to be Commonwealth citizens; Commonwealth citizens lose the right of abode if they cease to have such citizenship; wives, as a result of marriages occurring after the coming into force of the Act, are no longer able to acquire the right of abode by the fact of such marriage

== Timeline ==
Aliens and Naturalization Act
Naturalization and Aliens Act, 1881
Immigration Act, 1910
Naturalization Act, 1914
Canadian Nationals Act, 1921
Canadian Citizenship Act (1946)
Citizenship Act (1976)
│
1867
│
1899
│
1931
│
1963
│
1995
│
2027
Timeline of Canadian nationality law

== See also ==
- Canadian immigration law
- Canadian nationality law
- Immigration to Canada
- Canadians of convenience
- Lost Canadians
