= International reactions to the 2006 Lebanon War =

Reactions to the 2006 Lebanon War came from states on all continents, supranational bodies, individuals and international NGOs, as well as political lobbyists in the United States.

== Supranational bodies ==
=== Arab League ===
The Arab League, in the words of Saudi Arabia's foreign minister, Prince Saud Al-Faisal, has called Hezbollah's attacks on Israel "unexpected, inappropriate, and irresponsible acts." With the League fearing a "widening of tension and possible Israeli strike against Syria," Syrian Vice President Farouk al-Sharaa blamed Israel for the escalating violence in Lebanon and the Palestinian territories, stating: "It’s up to the resistance – both the Lebanese and the Palestinian – to decide what they are doing and why are they fighting."

Following a meeting of Arab League foreign ministers in Cairo on 16 July, Secretary-General Amr Moussa declared that the "Middle East peace process has failed. The whole process should now be sent back to the Security Council for a complete overhaul."

=== European Union ===
Finland, which held the European Union's rotating presidency, issued the following statement:

The European Union is greatly concerned about the disproportionate use of force by Israel in Lebanon in response to attacks by Hezbollah on Israel. The presidency deplores the loss of civilian lives and the destruction of civilian infrastructure. The imposition of an air and sea blockade on Lebanon cannot be justified.

On 28 July 2006, a senior EU delegation threw its support behind the 7-point plan of Lebanese Prime Minister Fouad Siniora. Finnish Foreign Minister Erkki Tuomioja, representing the EU presidency, said Siniora's plan was a "good basis to reach an agreement," and that he was "struck by the unity of the Lebanese government."

On 8 August 2006, the EU issued a memo in which it outlined its response to the conflict.

=== United Nations ===
Geir Pedersen, the top UN official in Lebanon, said "Hezbollah’s action escalates the already tense situation along the Blue Line and is an act of very dangerous proportions," in a statement. Jan Egeland, a top United Nations humanitarian official, said that the Israeli response is in violation of international law. He was equally critical of Hezbollah and Hamas for abducting Israeli soldiers, saying that those who had seized Israeli soldiers and fired rockets into Israel from southern Lebanon bore their share of the blame. Egeland also criticized Hezbollah for using the civilian population as cover, telling the BBC:

I also clearly see that Hezbollah is trying to blend into the civilian population in too many places and they bear also a heavy responsibility for this. They do not seem to care that they really inflict a lot of suffering on their own population.

UN Secretary General Kofi Annan demanded that Hezbollah immediately free the two captured Israeli soldiers, and sent a three-man party to the Middle East to urge countries to show restraint. On 17 July 2006, Annan and UK Prime Minister Tony Blair called for an international force to be sent to Lebanon to stop the attacks on Israel by Hezbollah. Blair said that the force could "stop the bombardment coming over into Israel and therefore gives Israel a reason to stop its attacks on Hezbollah." On 19 July, Annan went on to condemn Israel's use of force: "I condemn without reservations the attack in southern Lebanon, and demand that Israeli troops be released immediately." The next day, Annan demanded both sides stop all violence immediately, condemning Hezbollah for sparking the conflict but also attacking Israel for its "excessive use of force."

According to Annan, the "three vital reasons" for "immediate cessation of hostilities" were:

1. "prevent further loss of innocent life and the infliction of further suffering;"
2. "to allow full humanitarian access to those in need;" and
3. "give diplomacy the chance to work out a practical package of actions that would provide a lasting solution to the current crisis."

On 26 July, the United States blocked the UN Security Council from issuing a statement that would have condemned Israel's bombing of a UN post on the Lebanon border that killed four military observers overnight.

On 29 July, Under-Secretary-General for Humanitarian Affairs and Emergency Relief Coordinator Jan Egeland appealed for a 72-hour truce to allow for humanitarian relief of the civilian population in Lebanon. This was later disputed by the Israelis, who said that all relief efforts were already ongoing. On 30 July, following the bombing of Qana by Israeli Air Force (IAF), Annan condemned the attack and urged the UN Security Council to also condemn it:

We must condemn this action in the strongest possible terms, and I appeal to you [the Security Council] to do likewise.... The tragic events in Qana remind us that, ten years ago over 100 people who had taken refuge in this same village suffered a similar fate. We must deliver the region from this seemingly endless cycle of violence.

=== Others ===
- At its Annual Ministerial Meeting in Kuala Lumpur, ASEAN delegates condemned the violence and destruction in the Middle East, urging all parties to practice utmost constrain in avoiding civilian casualties.
- The Non-Aligned Movement has condemned what they claimed to be disproportionate Israeli attacks on Gaza and Lebanon and called for an international force to be deployed to prevent the violence from spiralling into a regional conflict.
- The Organisation of Islamic Cooperation called for the convening of the U.N. General Assembly in "emergency special session," under the terms of the "Uniting for Peace" resolution, if the Security Council failed to act immediately in the crisis.

== Middle East ==
=== Egypt ===
President Mubarak of Egypt made a number of comments on the violence, condemning the Israeli military attack in Lebanon, while also indirectly criticizing Hezbollah for harming Arab interests. Mubarak, along with King Abdullah II of Jordan, criticized Hezbollah's actions as being harmful, saying that the actions may have "the region being dragged into 'adventurism' that does not serve Arab interests." Mubarak was criticized for his statement on a 9 July television broadcast by Al Arabiya: "Definitely Iran has influence on Shi'ites. Shi'ites are 65 percent of the Iraqis.... Most of the Shi'ites are loyal to Iran, and not to the countries they are living in."

In a newspaper interview with Egypt's Al Gomhuria on 26 July, Mubarak said:

Those who urge Egypt to go to war to defend Lebanon or Hizbullah are not aware that the time of exterior adventures is over. This was possible at a time when the Egyptian population was only 24 million, but it is not possible now with 75 million citizens in need of development, services, job opportunities and residential projects.

The next day, an interview with TIME magazine quoted Mubarak as saying that Israeli conduct in Lebanon "went way too far" and has "triggered an increasing rage within the Arabs, Moslems and worldwide." The President is also reported to have told TIME:

Military operations will not solve Israel's problems with Hizbullah. An immediate cease-fire is the utmost priority. Cessation of hostilities would create the environment conducive to addressing such problems in a candid manner. The bloodshed and the heavy toll of Israel's operations must be brought to an end.

On July 13, Foreign Minister Aboul Gheit stated: "Targeting civilians under the pretext of fighting terrorism is unacceptable and unjustified. Israeli practices violate international law. We condemn any military action that targets civilians. We consider it a terrorist act, regardless of who the civilians are or its source." Almost a week later, Gheit went on to say that "[a] cease-fire is imperative and we have to keep working to reach that objective. It is imperative. We have to bring it to an end as soon as possible."

=== Iran ===
On 13 July, Foreign ministry spokesman Hamid-Reza Asefi condemned Israel's response: "The Zionist regime is desperate because of the resistance put up by regional Muslim nations and is now resorting to blind tactics against the innocent people of Lebanon with full US backing." Iran also added that an Israeli attack against Syria would be considered an attack against the entire Muslim world, which would bring about a "fierce response." Three days later, Iranian President Mahmoud Ahmadinejad was quoted as saying that the "Zionists think that they are victims of Hitler, but they act like Hitler and behave worse than Genghis Khan."

On 27 July, Ahmadinejad stated that:

Not only has the occupying regime [Israel] attacked and destroyed Lebanon under the support of certain countries, it has victimized several hundred women and children while thousands of people have been displaced escaping Israeli bombardment.

In an August 2006 speech during an emergency meeting of Muslim leaders in Malaysia, Ahmadinejad also called for an immediate cease-fire to end the fighting between Israel and the Iranian-backed group Hezbollah.

During a visit to Beirut on 2 August, Iranian Foreign Minister Manouchehr Mottaki, referring to the 'Rome convention' of late July, said: "We consider those, who helped in preventing the Rome convention from condemning and stopping the attack, as partners to the Zionist entity in its savage crimes committed against innocent women and children in Lebanon."

=== Iraq ===
On 14 July, Iraqi Parliament Speaker Mahmoud Al-Mashhadani condemned Israeli attacks on Lebanon and called on both the UN Security Council and the international community to act, warning against the outcome for the region. Al-Mashhadani reportedly indicated that the "attacks reflected Israel's disrespect of the international community and international agreements."

Hoshyar Zebari, the Iraqi Foreign Minister in the US-backed government, also represented Iraq at a closed session meeting in Cairo with Arab League Foreign Ministers on 15 July. The meeting was convened to discuss the possibility of a resolution on the conflict.

Iraqi Prime Minister Nouri al-Maliki is reported to have condemned Israel during the conflict, saying: "We call on the world to take quick stands to stop the Israeli aggression" and "[Israel's] excessive use of force is to be condemned."

=== Saudi Arabia ===
A Saudi official, quoted by the Saudi Press Agency on 13 July, was critical of Hezbollah guerrillas—without naming them—of "uncalculated adventures" that precipitated the latest Middle East crisis:

A difference should be drawn between legitimate resistance and rash adventures carried out by elements inside the state and those behind them without consultation or coordination with Arab countries.... The Kingdom sees that it is time for those elements alone to shoulder the full responsibility for this irresponsible behavior and that the burden of ending the crisis they have created falls on them alone.

=== Syria ===
Vice President Farouk al-Sharaa said that Israel is responsible for the conflict, due to the Israeli occupation of the West Bank. The Syrian Baath Party has also expressed its solidarity and support with Hezbollah. Syria's military had been put on high alert. Syria's president Bashar al-Assad had also released a statement, saying:

The occupying enemy hasn't forgotten the humiliating defeat and its submissive exit from south Lebanon under the strikes bold resistance.… Syria, which stood by its brother (Lebanon) and sacrificed martyrs to defend Lebanon's freedom as we did for Syria's sovereignty, remains as always adamant in standing by our Arab people who's fighting in Lebanon and Palestine, and by the bold national resistance who struck the enemy. All threats voiced by powers in the world who support the enemy won't deter us from continuing to support our brothers…because we believe that falling for the sake of heaven (martyrdom) is the only way to freedom and victory. We have to make all effort in training to save every drop of blood when the hour comes. The fighting continues so long our land is occupied and our rights are denied. Victory will be achieved God willing.… [T]he Israeli enemy continues its extermination war against our proud peoples in Lebanon and Palestine. Our brothers in Lebanon are being subjected to aggression by the Israeli war machine from the air, the sea and the ground.… The aggression, killing and destruction committed by the Israelis in Lebanon are part of an operation that was planned and organized by the large forces dominating the international community.

=== Others ===
- Jordan: A statement from the Jordanian Government said: "Jordan stands against whoever exposes the Palestinian people and their cause, Lebanon and its sovereignty to unexpected dangers. Israel's use of force against unarmed civilians and the outcome in terms of the human loss and destruction of civil institutions." Jordan has also denounced Hezbollah's actions believing them to be harmful to Arab interests in the region.
- Kuwait: After receiving Lebanese Member of Parliament and Head of Future Block Saad Rafiq Al-Hariri, Prime Minister Sheikh Nasser Al-Mohammed Al-Ahmed Al-Sabah expressed solidarity with Lebanon, and condemned what it cited as "Israeli aggression on the Lebanese people."
- Palestinian Authority: Palestinian Authority chairman Mahmoud Abbas described Israel's incursion as the start of an escalation to a large-scale Middle East war. He urged World Powers "to stop this serious deterioration."
- Yemen: The ruling party, General People's Congress strongly condemned the actions of which it considered to be aggressions against the Palestinians and the Lebanese and called for the international community to intervene. Other political parties have also condemned the Israelis, and announced their support for the Palestinian and Lebanese people "in their fight for their right of survival and defeating occupier." They also called for the closing of Israeli embassies in Arab countries.

== Asia ==
=== Armenia ===
Foreign minister Vardan Oskanyan issued a statement:

Armenia is extremely concerned about the military actions in Lebanon and their escalation, as well as the great loss of civilian life.… Armenia condemns any violence whether it be abduction or use of force.… We particularly denounce the use of such disproportionate force intended solely to collectively punish civilians and damage infrastructure. This kind of reaction by Israel is particularly difficult to understand given the fact that the Lebanese government has clearly distanced itself from the abduction incident. We hope that there will be restraint in the region and also hope there will be an immediate ceasefire so that the issues can be addressed by peaceful means.

=== China ===
Foreign minister Li Zhaoxing urged all parties concerned to keep restraint to avoid further deterioration of the situation, expressing his close attention to and deep concern over the conflict. After a Chinese U.N. observer was killed when a U.N. observation post in Lebanon was hit during an Israeli airstrike, China called for an Israeli apology and demanded that Israel stop bombing U.N. positions. China asked the U.N. Security Council to strongly condemn the Israeli bombing and the permanent representative of China in U.N. implied that U.S. resistance in allowing such condemnation would affect China's position in the nuclear program of Iran.

The Security Bureau of Hong Kong reminded Hong Kong residents in Lebanon and Israel to keep abreast of latest developments and pay attention to personal safety.

=== India ===
The Ministry of External Affairs expressed concern over the growing tensions in Lebanon and urged all parties to end the violence in favor of peaceful negotiation, issuing the following statement: "We are seriously concerned about the escalating tension in West Asia as a result of developments on the Israel-Lebanese border since yesterday which have the potential to inflame the region further and widen the conflict."

On 27 July 2006, India made a statement condemning Israel’s "disproportionate and excessive use of force" in Lebanon, but simultaneously criticized Hezbollah for kidnapping two Israeli soldiers. In a statement to Parliament, Junior Foreign Minister Anand Sharma demanded an immediate cessation to hostilities, saying Lebanon had become a "victim by default."

=== Indonesia ===
President Susilo Bambang Yudhoyono stated that "Indonesia has repeatedly called on Israel to stop its military action.... [T]he United Nations has to take action to prevent the conflict from escalating." Earlier, Foreign Minister Hassan Wirajuda said, "We condemn the military actions that have killed many innocent civilians." Indonesia also warned the United States that supporting Israel in the conflict may lead to a rise in Islamic fundamentalism, making it more difficult for Muslim states to fight radical Islam. Indonesian foreign minister Hassan Wirajuda likewise expressed fears that even moderate muslims may become radical.

=== Japan ===
Prime Minister Junichiro Koizumi urged restraint, stating: "I understand the anger of the Israelis, but I hope you will not seek an eye for an eye and keep in mind the importance of peace." On 31 July, as Japan condemned the Israeli air strike in Qana and called for a ceasefire, Koizumi went on to say that "it is truly deplorable that innocent people are falling victim day after day."

Likewise, Chief Cabinet secretary Shinzo Abe said:

It is extremely regrettable that this kind of incident occurred amid international calls on Israel to exercise self-restraint. We call on the parties concerned to make a cease-fire, while seeking sincere and utmost efforts by all countries concerned to resolve the problem in order to prevent civilian casualties and not to further worsen the situation.

=== Kazakhstan ===
Kazakh officials have called upon the UN Security Council to adopt a consolidated resolution on the escalation of conflict in Lebanon. Press Secretary of the Kazakh Foreign Ministry Ilyas Omarov stated:

Kazakhstan calls the conflicting parties to an immediate ceasefire and considers it necessary that the UN Security Council adopt a consolidated resolution on the escalation of conflict in Lebanon.… We deeply regret about the continuing escalation of the conflict causing sufferings of the peaceful population of Lebanon, Palestine, and Israel. Kazakhstan believes that military actions should not cause casualties among peaceful population or demolition of social infrastructure, as well as a humanitarian crisis.… A decision of Israel to suspend the air strikes for 48 hours must become a first step on the way to cessation of military actions in the region.

=== Malaysia ===
Dato' Seri Syed Hamid Albar, Malaysia's Minister of Foreign Affairs, condemned "the unlawful airstrikes by Israel" and "the irresponsible use of force by Israel on Lebanon" causing "hardship and suffering to [Lebanon's] people." Malaysia urged Israel to "cease all military action," and called "upon the international community to intervene." On 20 July, Albar told the press that Malaysia was considering plan to deploy peacekeepers to Lebanon.

During an emergency meeting of Muslim leaders by the Organisation of the Islamic Conference on 3 July, chairman Dato' Seri Abdullah Ahmad Badawi called for the convening of the United Nations General Assembly in 'emergency special session', under the terms of the "Uniting for Peace" resolution, if the Security Council failed to act immediately in the crisis.

On 5 August, Malaysia rejected plans for a dialogue with Israel to resolve the crisis on grounds of no diplomatic ties between the two nations.

=== Pakistan ===
Pakistan's Foreign Ministry has expressed outrage over "Israeli aggression against Lebanon and Palestine," releasing the following statement:

This attack is a flagrant violation of Lebanese sovereignty and contravenes the norms and principles of the UN charter. The aerial bombardment of Beirut airport and the naval blockade of Lebanese waters announced by the Israeli government represents a dangerous escalation. We have also watched with deep concern the Israeli attacks on Gaza that have resulted in enormous losses in life and property.

The statement also said that "the latest Israeli aggression against Palestinian territories and Lebanon have undermined hopes and efforts for peace in the region," arguing that "the situation demands restraint and a return to diplomacy and negotiations."

On 16 July, Pakistan condemned the violence being committed by Israel against Lebanon and urged that attacks resulting in loss of life and property must be stopped immediately. Prime Minister Shaukat Aziz expressed these views while talking to his Lebanese counterpart Fouad Siniora: "Pakistan appeals to the world community, the permanent members of the Security Council, the UN and other international bodies to intervene," Aziz said, adding that Pakistan stood by the people of Lebanon and respected their sovereignty and territorial integrity.

=== Tajikistan ===
Tajikistan denounced Israel's attacks on Lebanon on 27 July, together with Iran and Afghanistan. Tajik President Emomali Rahmonov stated:

We are seriously concerned about the deteriorating security conditions in the Middle East, particularly more so due to Israel's attack against Lebanon that has claimed the lives of hundreds of innocent civilians so far.… We hereby ask for an immediate end to those attacks, and the solving of the dispute through negotiations.… According to latest reports, most of the victims of Israeli attacks are the Lebanese children, youngsters, women, and elderly folks.

=== Others ===
- Afghanistan: On 27 July, the US-backed government of Afghanistan, together with Iran and Tajikistan denounced Israel's attacks against Lebanon. Afghan President Hamid Karzai stated: "We feel sad about the death of dozens of civilians in Lebanon and ask for solving the crisis through diplomatic channels."
- Bangladesh: The Foreign Ministry of Bangladesh condemned the Israeli attacks and called them State Terrorism. Bangladeshi Foreign Minister Morshed Khan urged Western nations to "restrain Israel," and accused many Western countries of applying a double standard in favor of Israel when dealing with the Middle East. Bangladesh sent Infantry battalions to Lebanon to serve as UN peacekeepers in the immediate aftermath of the war. Troops from Bangladesh and Nepal were the first to arrive in Southern Lebanon. The Bangladesh Navy has one Mod. Type 053H class FF(G) and one Sea Dragon class OPV as part of the Maritime Task Force.
- Philippines: Filipino President Arroyo had urged stranded OFWs to leave Lebanon at once. Several lawmakers had also voiced support for a ceasefire between Hezbollah and Israeli forces, indicating a condemnation to Israel.
- Vietnam: The Foreign Ministry of Vietnam condemned Israel's air strike on Qana. Le Dung, a spokesman for the Ministry, further stated that "Vietnam calls upon all related sides to cease fire immediately and to demonstrate restraint to avoid causing harm to civilians."

== Europe and Oceania ==
=== Australia ===
Prime Minister John Howard has stated that he is "appalled at the loss of life on both sides." However, he blamed the conflict on Hezbollah's breaches of UN resolutions and international law.

== Americas ==
=== Brazil ===
The foreign ministry issued a statement saying that the Brazilian government was "dismayed" at the deaths of four Brazilians from the same family, including two children, killed by an Israeli attack while vacationing in Lebanon. Brazil condemned both sides escalating into a bigger conflict. In another statement confirming the death of another Brazilian child in a separate Israeli attack, it also called Israeli actions disproportionate. It urged South Lebanon to recognize Israel's boundaries. Additionally, Brazil called for dialogue between the parties so that a cease-fire can be achieved and the kidnapped Israeli soldiers can be released.

=== Canada ===
Prime Minister Stephen Harper said he did not favour sending Canadian troops to southern Lebanon as part of a multinational peacekeeping force, adding that countries in the area should be responsible for resolving the conflict.

At the outset of the conflict, Harper said "Israel has the right to defend itself," adding the opinion that "Israel's response under the circumstances has been measured." Harper's characterisation of Israel's response as "measured" created controversy in Canada. On 17 July 2006, the Prime Minister appeared to moderate these remarks, noting that the situation had deteriorated since his initial comments, but that it was difficult for Israel to fight "non-governmental forces" when they are embedded in the civilian population. He added that "the attack [on Israel] is the cause of this immediate conflict," and that "Israel must show restraint as part of the solution but it is essential that the attacks against Israel would stop and it is essential that Israeli soldiers be returned to Israel."

Regarding resolution to the conflict, Harper stated it is "essential that Hezbollah and Hamas release their Israeli prisoners and any countries in that area that have influence on these organizations should encourage an end to violence and recognize and encourage the recognition of Israel's right to exist." Speaking of the situation in both Lebanon and Gaza on 18 July, Harper told reporters, "We all want to encourage not just a ceasefire, but a resolution. And a resolution will only be achieved when everyone gets to the table and everyone admits that recognition of each other," referring to the refusal of Hezbollah and Hamas to recognize Israel's right to exist.

Harper laid the blame for the civilian deaths on both sides at the feet of Hezbollah:

Hezbollah's objective is violence.… Hezbollah believes that through violence it can create, it can bring about the destruction of Israel. Violence will not bring about the destruction of Israel…and inevitably the result of the violence will be the deaths primarily of innocent people.

Harper and his former Foreign Affairs Minister, Peter MacKay, reiterated their support for Israel's position, while urging restraint and calling for a ceasefire.

On 6 August 2006, Bloc Québécois leader Gilles Duceppe was accused of supporting Hezbollah by Israel's ambassador to Canada, Alan Baker, after Duceppe participated in a march in Montreal protesting the war in Lebanon.

The National Post asserted later in 2006 that, of the 15,000 Canadians evacuated, about 7,000 may have returned to Lebanon within a month of being evacuated, part of the public discussion of Canadians of convenience.

==== Public opinion ====
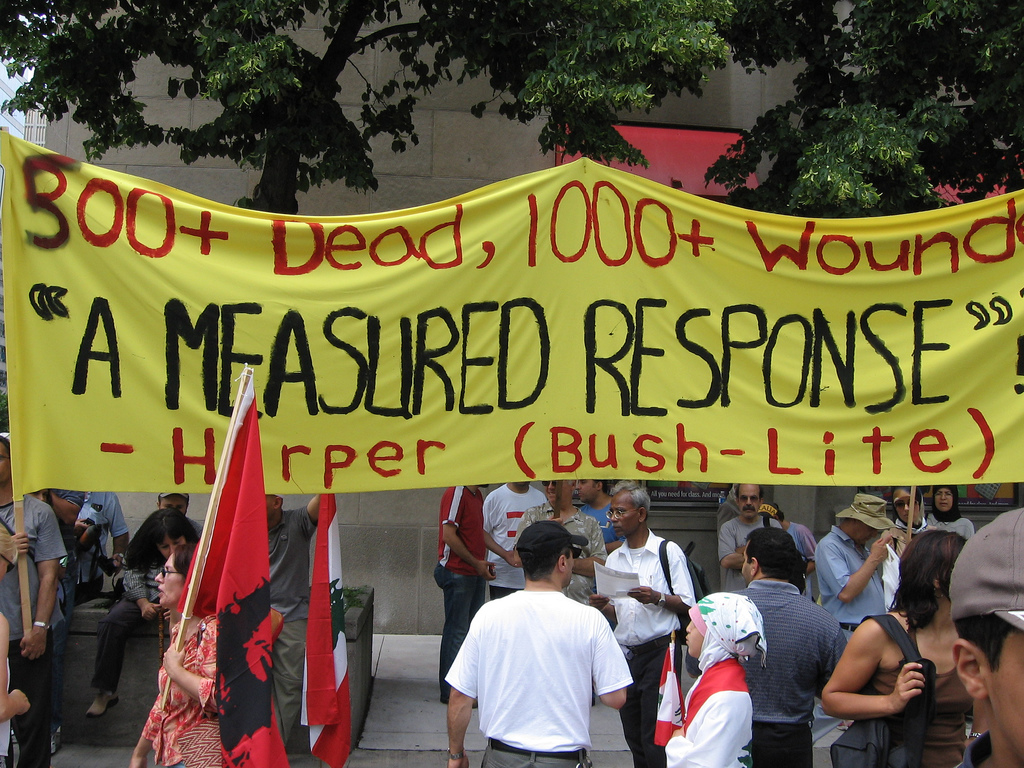
Harper's "measured response" quote is criticised on this banner from a 29 July protest in Toronto, Ontario.

Opinions on the conflict are mixed in Canada, as is reflected by the editorial content of the nation's media. Some outlets, such as the Toronto Star, have criticized Israel's response to Hezbollah's actions as disproportionate, while other publications such as the National Post, have come out in support of the scope of Israel's military action and the position the Canadian government has taken, and have criticized those who have called the evacuation of Canadians in the region too slow. Commentators in other outlets (e.g., The Globe and Mail and the CBC) have represented a variety of views.

Canada has a large Lebanese community. About 30,000 Canadians, mainly of Lebanese descent, were in Lebanon at the time hostilities broke out, and the Canadian government has been making efforts to evacuate those who wish to leave in an operation that has been criticized for being slow and inefficient. On 17 July, a group of protesters, primarily expatriate Lebanese, gathered in front of the Israeli consulate in Montreal and protested the continued bombing in Lebanon. Further protests took place on 22 July in localities across Canada.

A poll of Canadians published in the 25 July edition of the National Post shows that support among Canadians (bar Quebec) was greatly on the side of Israel, with 64% stating that "Israel's action was either somewhat or completely justified." In all provinces except Quebec, support was greater than 50%, with British Columbia, Saskatchewan, Manitoba, Alberta, and Ontario having the highest support for Israel (in that order). When asked which side of the conflict should make a major compromise in order to have a ceasefire, 63% of Canadians said it was "those who kidnapped the Israeli soldiers."

=== United States ===
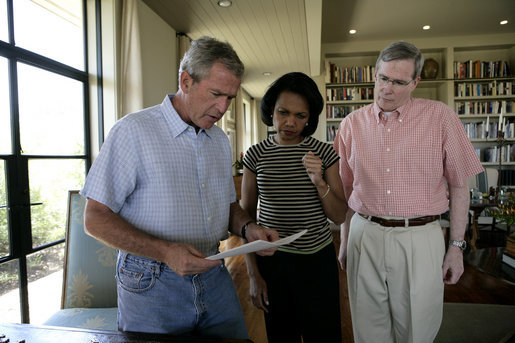
Bush, Rice and Stephen Hadley discuss the situation at Bush's ranch.

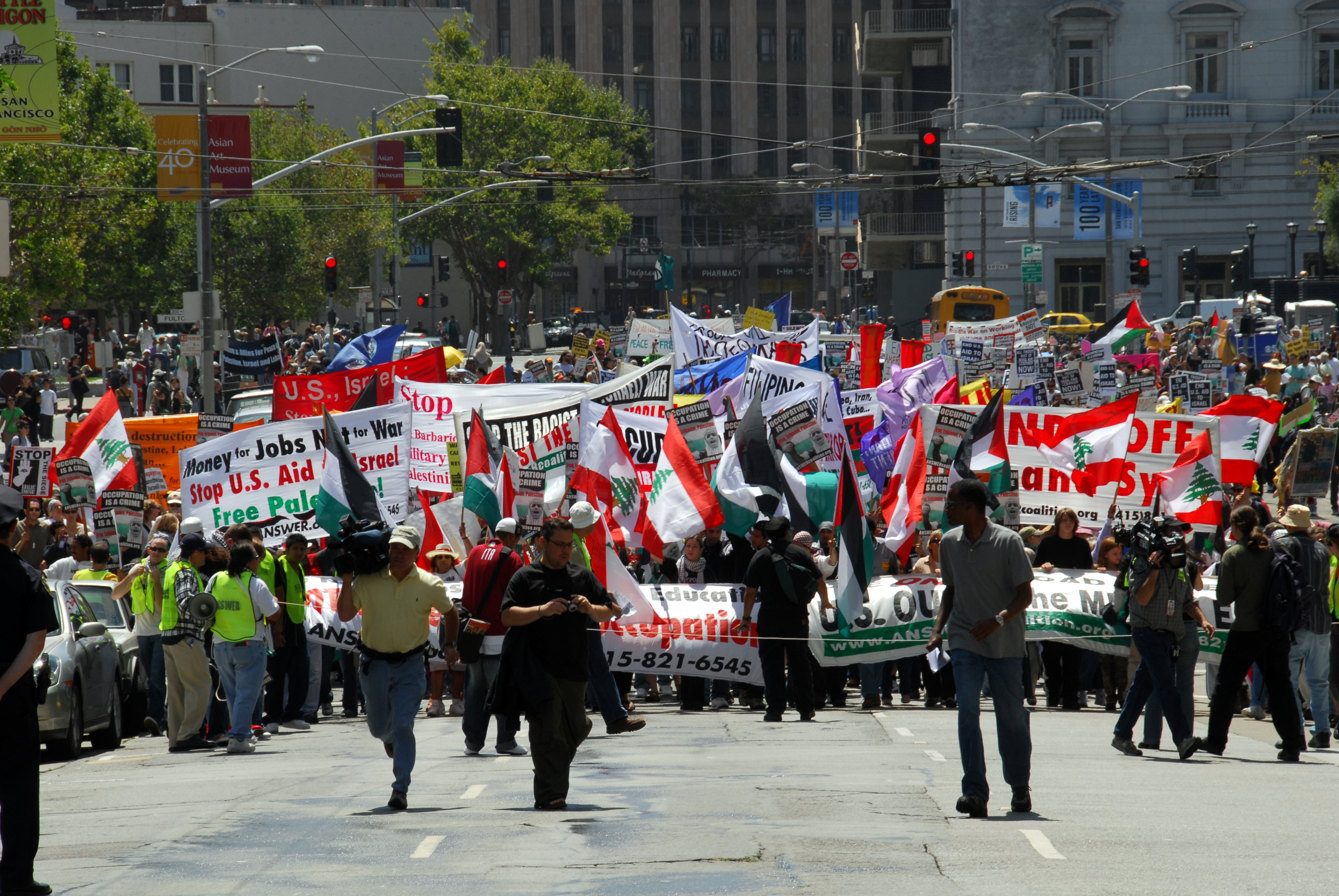
Protest against the war in San Francisco.

Following the Zar'it-Shtula incident, the United States government condemned what it called Hezbollah's "unprovoked act of terrorism," and called for the "immediate and unconditional release" of the soldiers.

The United States government has blamed Hezbollah and Syria for the crisis. Assistant Secretary of State for Near Eastern Affairs David Welch condemned what he called a "dangerous escalation" and calls for the release of the Israeli soldiers. Senate Majority Leader Bill Frist said, "We must hold the governments of Syria and Iran accountable for their continued support to Hezbollah. So long as these governments are failing to live up to their responsibilities, no one should question the right of the government of Israel to act in self-defense against terrorists operating from Lebanon." Frist also said that the Lebanese government should uphold its responsibility under a United Nations resolution to make sure its territory isn't being used for Hezbollah or other groups. President George W. Bush said "I want the world to address the root cause of the problem, and the root cause of the problem is Hezbollah."

Bush remarked on 13 July that Israel has the right to defend itself. He also said that the "democracy of Lebanon is an important part of laying a foundation of peace in that region," and that the "concern is that any activities by Israel to protect herself will weaken the (Siniora) government."

The Bush administration openly rejected what it considered to be meaningless calls for a ceasefire in escalating Mideast violence, as White House spokesman Tony Snow argued that President Bush "is not going to make military decisions for Israel." On 18 July 2006, according to the New York Times, US and Israeli officials agreed for the bombings to continue for another week. "Secretary of State Condoleezza Rice rejected an immediate ceasefire and said one could only occur once certain conditions are met." John Bolton, the U.S. Ambassador to the United Nations, rejected the call for a ceasefire, stating that it is simplistic to think that one can "just declare a ceasefire and act as if that is going to solve the problem." On 15 July 2006, according to U.S. unilateral opposition in the UN Security Council, "the United Nations Security Council again rejected pleas from Lebanon that it call for an immediate cease-fire between Israel and Lebanon. The Israeli newspaper Haaretz reported the U.S. was the sole member of the 15-nation UN body to oppose any council action at all at this time.

On 15 July, the United States sent a security team to Beirut in an effort to begin planning the evacuation of American citizens from Lebanon to Cyprus. The US was believed to be using the facilities at the British Sovereign Base Areas on Cyprus, which included RAF Akrotiri.

On 17 July, in a private conversation that was unintentionally picked up by a live microphone at the G8 conference, Bush told UK Prime Minister Tony Blair that "We’re not blaming Israel and we’re not blaming the Lebanese government." Bush asked "What about Kofi Annan? I don't like the sequence of it. His attitude is basically cease-fire and everything else happens," to which Blair responded, "I think the thing that is really difficult is you can't stop this unless you get this international presence agreed." Bush reasserted his view that the impetus needed to be placed on Hezbollah to end the conflict: "What they need to do is get Syria to get Hezbollah to stop doing this shit, and it's over."

At the G8 Summit, President Bush said that "the root of the problem is Hezbollah" and that the U.S. is "never going to tell a nation how to defend herself." On 15 July, Bush called upon Syria to exert its influence over Hezbollah militants to get them to "lay down their arms," adding that only Israel should try to limit civilian casualties as it steps up attacks on its neighbor. "The soldiers need to be returned.... It's really sad where people are willing to take innocent life in order to stop that progress (for peace). As a matter of fact, it's pathetic." As President Bush stated,

Everybody abhors the loss of innocent life. On the other hand, what we recognize is that the root cause of the problem is Hezbollah. And that problem must be addressed. And it can be addressed internationally by making it clear to Syria that they've got to stop their support to Hezbollah. Syria's trying to get back into Lebanon, it looks like to me.... Sometimes it requires tragic situations to help bring clarity in the international community. And it is now clear for all to see that there are terrorist elements who want to destroy our democratic friends and allies, and the world must work to prevent them from doing so.

Bolton said there was no moral equivalence between the civilian casualties from the Israeli raids in Lebanon and those killed in Israel from "malicious terrorist acts." Asked to comment on the deaths in an Israeli air strike of eight Canadian citizens in southern Lebanon, Bolton said that it is a matter of great concern to us...that these civilian deaths are occurring." He added that "it's a tragedy.... I think it would be a mistake to ascribe moral equivalence to civilians who die as the direct result of malicious terrorist acts," while he defended Israel's military action as "self-defense," which has had "the tragic and unfortunate consequence of civilian deaths."

As the campaign in Lebanon began, on 14 July, the US Congress was notified of a potential sale of $210 million worth of jet fuel to Israel. The Defense Security Cooperation Agency noted that the sale of the JP-8 fuel, should it be completed, will "enable Israel to maintain the operational capability of its aircraft inventory," and "The jet fuel will be consumed while the aircraft is in use to keep peace and security in the region." It was reported on 24 July that the United States was in the process of providing Israel with "bunker buster" bombs, which would allegedly be used to target the leader of Lebanon's Hezbollah guerrilla group and destroy its trenches. According to Reuters and the New York Times, the Bush administration authorized the expedited processing and shipment of precision-guided bombs (already allotted for sale in 2005) to Israel to support the Israeli campaign, but did not announce the increased haste publicly.

On 25 July, Hassan Nasrallah, Hezbollah's secretary general, said the Israeli onslaught was an attempt by the US and Israel to "impose a new Middle East" in which Lebanon would be under US hegemony.

On 30 July, immediately following the IAF bombing of Qana in which a large number of fatalities took place, Secretary of State Condoleezza Rice reportedly stated:

"We [the United States Government] want a ceasefire as soon as possible, I would have wanted a ceasefire yesterday if possible, but the parties have to agree to a ceasefire and there have to be certain conditions in place... Any ceasefire has to have circumstances that are going to be acceptable to the parties."

Rice's comments came after an earlier television address by the Lebanese Prime Minister in which he indicated that the meetings scheduled with Rice that day were cancelled due to the events at Qana.

In sharp contrast to public policy, however, 65% of Americans said that "the U.S. [should] stay out of the situation" between Israel and Hezbollah.

Congress

On 18 July, the US Senate passed S.Res. 534 98-0 by unanimous consent, "Condemning Hezbollah and Hamas and their state sponsors and supporting Israel's exercise of its right to self-defense." Resolution 534 calls for the release of Israeli soldiers who are being held captive by Hezbollah or Hamas; condemns the governments of Iran and Syria for their continued support for Hezbollah and Hamas; urges all sides to protect innocent civilian life and infrastructure; and strongly supports the use of all diplomatic means available to free the captured Israeli soldiers. However, Senator Chuck Hagel eventually came to demand that the U.S. impose a ceasefire.

On 20 July 2006, the US House of Representatives passed resolution 921 supporting Israel's right to defend itself and condemning attacks against the State of Israel. The final vote was 410 to 8 in favour of the resolution.

On 30 July, Congress sent a letter to the EU's Head of Foreign Policy Javier Solana, asking that the EU add Hezbollah to its list of illegal terrorist organisations. The letter was signed by 210 members of Congress.

"We were dismayed to hear your 19 July assertion that the EU lacked 'sufficient data' to add Hizbullah to its terrorist list."

Members of Congress had already called on the EU, via a 2005 resolution, to add Hezbollah to the list. The EU declined all requests.

=== Venezuela ===
Ali Rodriguez, Foreign Minister of Venezuela, condemned Israel activities in Lebanon.

On 3 August, Venezuelan president Hugo Chávez declared he has withdrawn his country's ambassador from Israel to show his indignation over the military offensive in Lebanon. He called the Israeli attacks in Lebanon "genocide". He also spoke after returning from an international tour that included Iran. While there, Chávez called the Israeli offensive in Lebanon a "fascist outrage."

On 9 August, it was known that Venezuela is likely to sever ties with Israel in protest at its war against Lebanon, according to statements by President Hugo Chávez. "They have also recalled their ambassador and our next step will most likely be to break off diplomatic relations. I have no interest in maintaining diplomatic relations, or offices, or businesses, or anything with a state like Israel.".

On 25 August, Reuters reported that Chávez had called for Israeli leaders to face a trial for genocide over killing in the Lebanon conflict. Speaking from Beijing, Chávez said the Jewish state had "done something similar or, perhaps worse, who knows, than what the Nazis did".

== Africa ==
=== Somalia ===
In Somalia, the Islamic Courts Union sent men to aid Hezbollah. ICU commander Aden Hashi Farah handpicked 720 veteran fighters. While most were veterans of the Somali Civil War, some had fought in Afghanistan. The fighters were sent to Lebanon, where they fought alongside Hezbollah. A significant number were killed, and some were wounded, and taken back to Somalia for medical treatment. After the war, 100 of them returned to Somalia, while others stayed for advanced military training. Each fighter received $2,000 for his service, while the families of the dead were awarded $30,000.

=== South Africa ===
Foreign minister Aziz Pahad said that the South African Government was "greatly concerned" about the increasing violence between Israel, Palestine and Lebanon, fearing that it would lead to a "catastrophe and a possible regional war" in the Middle East.

== NGOs ==
=== Amnesty International ===
A press release by Amnesty International on 13 July condemns attacks by both Israel and Hezbollah as "a blatant breach of international humanitarian law and amount to war crimes." A briefing presented facts "strongly suggesting" that Israel's "extensive destruction" and "widespread attacks against public civilian infrastructure" was "deliberate and an integral part of the military strategy, rather than collateral damage". This behaviour suggested "a policy of punishing both the Lebanese government and the civilian population" in an effort to turn them against Hezbollah. The report also states that Israel to preserve the principle of proportionality, even if the destroyed objects could serve a dual purpose. It called for an independent and impartial inquiry appointed by UN, to investigate alleged war crimes by both Hezbollah and Israel.

=== Human Rights Watch ===
A press release by Human Rights Watch issued on 3 August accuses Israeli forces of "hav[ing] systematically failed to distinguish between combatants and civilians in their military campaign against Hezbollah in Lebanon". In a 50-page report, the human rights organization analyzed almost two dozen cases of Israeli air and artillery attacks on civilian homes and vehicles. "The pattern of attacks shows the Israeli military’s disturbing disregard for the lives of Lebanese civilians," said Kenneth Roth, executive director of Human Rights Watch. "Our research shows that Israel’s claim that Hezbollah fighters are hiding among civilians does not explain, let alone justify, Israel’s indiscriminate warfare."

The "Indiscriminate Bombing in Lebanon [is] a War Crime"

=== International Red Cross ===
The International Committee of the Red Cross stated that they have "serious questions" regarding the actions of Israeli forces in Lebanon. ICRC director of operations Pierre Kraehenbuehl stated at a press conference in Geneva that "The high number of civilian casualties and the extent of damage to essential public infrastructure raise serious questions regarding respect for the principle of proportionality in the conduct of hostilities." The ICRC is responsible for protecting the Geneva Conventions, which discuss the rules of war. The IRCR stated that these rules not only apply to Israel, but also to Hezbollah militants

According to Democracy Now!, "The International Committee of the Red Cross also criticized Israel for killing so many civilians and for destroying much of Lebanon’s public infrastructure."

== Reactions by communities and citizens ==
=== Australia ===
On 22 July 2006, between 10,000 and 20,000 Sydney residents, mostly of Lebanese & Arab heritage, flocked onto George Street in the city's CBD.There was a huge police presence, including riot police, mounted police, dog squads and helicopters. Arab communities have not mobilised in this scale for years in this rally organised by 30 community organisations and the Stop The War Coalition. Similar protests were also held in other major cities across Australia. In Melbourne, there were 10,000, in Brisbane 500 and in Canberra 300. Slide show here of rallies

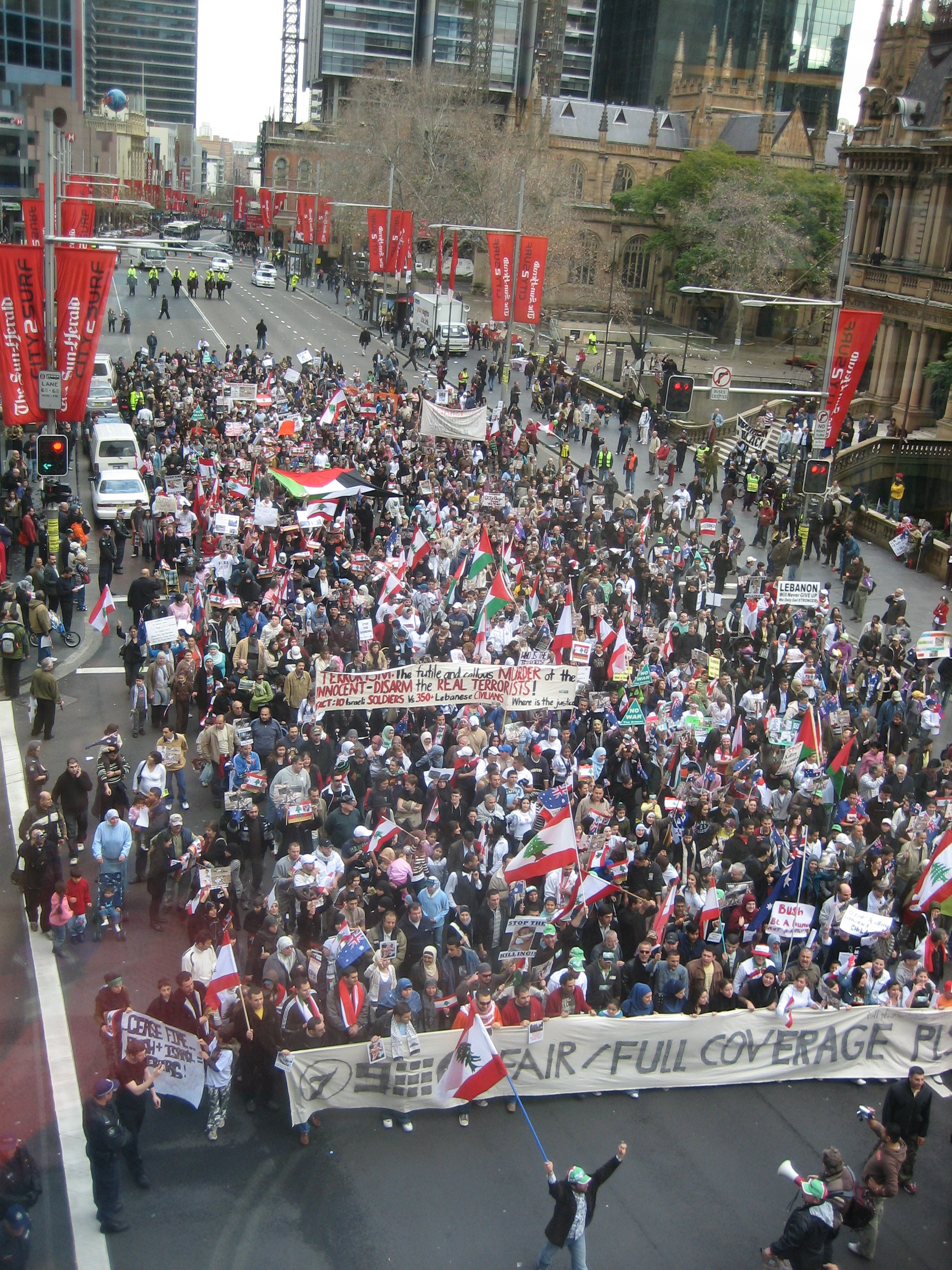
Lebanese protest in Sydney, 22 July 2006

On 19 July, about 2000 members of Sydney's Jewish community held peace vigil and service at the Sydney Great Synagogue.

On 29 July, between 200 and 400 protestors in support of Lebanon and Palestinians marched in Perth, Western Australia. The rally had been organised by the Perth Peace Group and Socialist Alliance with the aim of a peaceful protest. After marching through the Central Business District (CBD), the rally moved to the Sheraton hotel where John Howard was giving a keynote address to the Western Australia Liberals state conference. As Howard exited the building protesters gathered in numbers, and chanted "Shame" and "We want peace," with some protestors surging towards his car. Light scuffles broke out, followed by two arrests. A follow-up rally was held in solidarity outside of the East Perth police watch house, protesters dispersed shortly afterwards.

=== Azerbaijan ===
An anti-Israeli protest of 70 people was held in the Azerbaijani town of Nardaran. The protestors burnt flags of Israel and the United States, chanting slogans condemning Israel. The protests also targeted other states supporting Israel, and expressed support for Hezbollah. Local resident Haji Alikram Aliyev declared of the government, "They do not fear Allah but Jews. We cannot keep silence in this case or else it will be betrayal," he said. Haji Hajiaga Nuri, leader of the Azerbaijan Islamic Party declared "Azerbaijani parliament should follow the Turkish parliament and abolish the Israel-Azerbaijan friendship commission." A demonstration outside the Israeli Embassy was planned for 9 August.

=== Belgium ===
There has also been a demonstration in Brussels against Israel's military actions.

The families of the kidnapped Israelis met with European Union parliament members in Brussels to appeal for help in obtaining a sign of life from their loved ones. Thousands rallied in Brussels for Israel and demanding the release of the abducted soldiers.

=== Brazil ===
There are programmed (and one already have happened) two demonstrations in São Paulo against Israel.

=== Canada ===
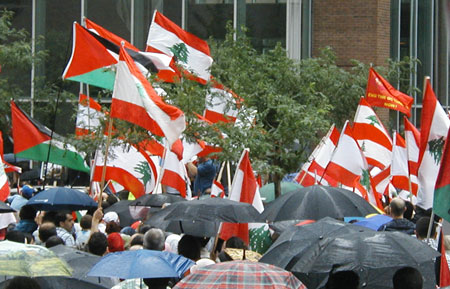
Protestors wave Lebanese flags in Montreal, Quebec, Canada.

In Montreal, Canadians protested against Israel and against Canadian Prime Minister Stephen Harper near the Israeli consulate, while supporters of Israel praised Harper.

In Montreal, 22 July 2006, an estimated 1,000 protesters marched along west Sainte-Catherine Street then south on Jeanne-Mance before rallying outside Complèxe Léo-Parizeau on boulevard René-Lévesque. Politicians participating included Maria Mourani and Francine Lalonde of the Bloc Québécois. La Presse gave the story front page coverage.

Montreal, 30 July 2006, an estimated 3,000 protesters gathered in Dorchester Square outside the Israeli Consulate at boulevard René-Lévesque and rue Peel. Demonstrators marched north on Peel, east on Sainte-Catherine, north on Mansfield, west on de Maisoneuve then south on Peel, returning to the starting point. What had been planned as a vigil became a much larger event with the news of the Qana attack the day before. Emotions were quite raw, and while the demonstration was peaceful, some protesters openly supported Hezbollah.

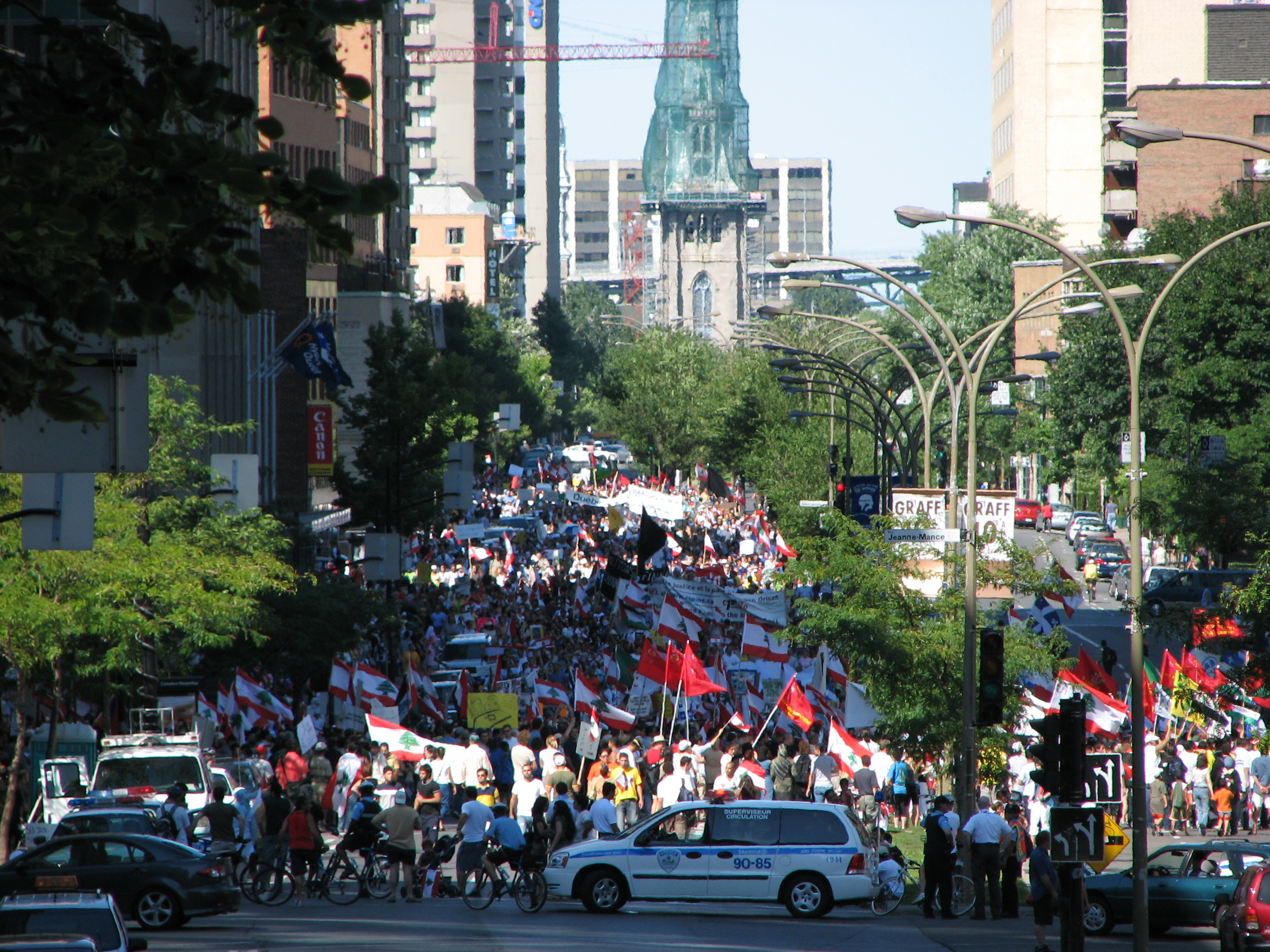
Protest in Montreal, Quebec, Canada 6 August 2006

Montreal, 6 August 2006 an estimated 15,000 protesters assembled at Parc Lafontaine at 13h00. At 14h00 they marched north on rue de la Roche, west on avenue du Mont Royal, south on rue Saint-Denis and finally west on boulevard René-Lévesque. March halted outside the federal government building, Complèxe Léo-Parizeau at approximately 16h00. Politicians participating in the protest included Gilles Duceppe, leader of Bloc Québécois, André Boisclair, leader of Parti Québécois, Liberal MP Denis Coderre and Quebec Green Party chief Scott McKay. A group of Neturei Karta Orthodox Jews, came from New York City to attend the protest. Protest was peaceful, police presence was almost exclusively for traffic control.

Despite the protests, a poll of Canadians published in the 25 July edition of the National Post shows that support among Canadians (bar Quebec) is greatly on the side of Israel; with 64% stating that "Israel's action was either somewhat or completely justified". In all provinces except Quebec support was greater than 50%, with British Columbia, Saskatchewan, Manitoba, Alberta and Ontario having the highest support for Israel (in that order). When asked which side of the conflict should make a major compromise in order to have a ceasefire, 63% of Canadians said it was "those who kidnapped the Israeli soldiers."

A Strategic Counsel poll for CTV and The Globe and Mail, published 1 August 2006, showed that the Harper government's open support of Israel is opposed by 45% of the Canadian public, while 32% support it. Again in Quebec opposition was strongest, 63% being opposed to the government's position, while 17% support it. On the question of Canadian neutrality, 77% of Canadians stated Canada should remain neutral, 16% stated Canada should support Israel and 1% stated Canada should support Hezbollah.

=== Denmark ===
On 21 July 2006, a pro-Israel demonstration was held on the central square of Copenhagen, with the theme "Secure borders for everybody". A Gallup poll on 5 August, showed an overwhelming Danish support for the Israeli side of the conflict, with 48% saying they had most sympathy for Israel while the "Shia Muslim militia" only found support by 7%

=== Egypt ===
On 28 July it was reported that around 1,000 demonstrators gathered in Cairo to protest. Waving copies of the Qur'an chanted the crowd was heard to chant: "O Sunni, O Shia, let's fight the Jews," and "the Jews and the Americans are killing our brothers in Lebanon." The protest had been organised by the Muslim Brotherhood.

=== Finland ===
On 20 August around 2,800 people rallied in the Finnish capital of Helsinki to show their support for Israel.

=== Germany ===
An anti-American/anti-Israel/anti-capitalist rally took place in Berlin.

A pro-Israel rally took place in Düsseldorf.

=== Iceland ===
Approximately 150 people gathered at Austurvöllur square outside the Alþingi to protest against Israeli action in Lebanon on 13 July.

=== India ===
While the overall attitude of Indian citizenry regarding the 2006 Israel-Lebanon conflict has been noncommital, there is a growing circle of Indian bloggers and opinion page writers who express support for Israel on this issue. They compare Israel's response with the Indian Government's response to the 11 July 2006 Mumbai train bombings and feel that the reaction has been too soft. Many wish for the same level response as Israel's retaliation towards Hezbollah. In particular, an Indian blogger writes:

"The unanimity, determination and the promptness involved in their arriving at the decision to root out Hizbollah ... deserves accolades!! [It is the] sharpest of contrasts to the callousness of Indian polity."

The post attracted pages of responses, including many comparing Indian politicians unfavorably to Israelis. Similarly, editorialists in The Pioneer, one of India's newspapers, argued that Delhi should follow Israel's example and attack Pakistan to show that it "cannot escape blame for its surrogates' actions", alluding to accusations made by the Indian Government and media of Pakistan's involvement in Terrorism in Kashmir.

=== Indonesia ===
On 16 July Thousands of protesters have rallied in Jakarta to condemn the Israeli attacks on the Palestinian territories and Lebanon. On 28 July thousands of demonstrators gathered in several cities with banners portraying Israeli Prime Minister Ehud Olmert and American President George W. Bush as "the real terrorists". During a protest outside the US embassy in Jakarta a speaker stated:

"It's ironic that America shouts about peace and democracy, and then supports Israel when it kills innocent Muslims. How can they stop terrorism against the west if they always make Muslims angry?"

=== Iraq ===
Thousands of Iraqis demonstrated in Baghdad on 14 July, praising the leader of Hezbollah and denouncing Israel and the United States for attacks against Lebanon. Some protesters said they were ready to fight the Israelis.

On 26 July, volunteers willing to fight alongside Hezbollah in Lebanon were recruited at a Shiite party headquarters in Basra. The party's Secretary General Yousif al Mousawi said about 200 people signed up within two hours. One recruit was quoted as saying: "We cannot stand by and watch our Hezbollah brothers fight alone.. If we are to die in Lebanon, then we will go to heaven. It is our duty as Muslims to fight."

On 4 August 200,000+ Iraqi Shiites filled the streets of the Shiite dominated Sadr City following calls to attend a rally in support of Hezbollah's resistance. The calls were made by cleric Muqtada al-Sadr. The crowd reportedly chanted: "Death to Israel, death to America!!"

=== Iran ===
On 18 July, thousands of Iranians poured into the streets of Tehran and staged a mass rally to condemn the attacks by Israel on Gaza and Lebanon.

=== Ireland ===
On 31 July, a Trócaire organised peace rally took place outside the United States embassy in Dublin. The rally attended by hundreds of people, including Lebanese citizens, demanded an end to the present conflict.

On 31 July, the Irish Film Institute canceled the sponsorship provided by the Embassy of Israel in Ireland for 'Walk on Water', one of the films being screened at the Dublin Gay and Lesbian Film Festival, due to the current Israeli activities in the Lebanon.

=== Israel ===
On 12 July 2006, just a few hours following the Israeli attack on Lebanon started, about 100-200 people in Tel Aviv protested in front of the Israeli Ministry of Defense against the attack. On 16 July, about 1,000 people demonstrated in Tel Aviv against the war. On 22 July 2,500 people, including both Jews and Arabs, gathered in Tel Aviv to demonstrate against the war. A demonstration was also held in Haifa on the same date but was called off after air raid sirens sounded. On 28 July, a "die-in" demonstration, with red paint being put on demonstrators' shirts and demonstrators lying on the ground to dramatise their point of view, took place in Tel Aviv.

On Saturday 5 August, nearly 10,000 (according to organizers) people demonstrated in Tel Aviv against the war in Lebanon. Participating organisations included Gush Shalom, the Women's Coalition for Peace, Ta'ayush, Anarchists Against the Wall, Yesh Gvul, the Israeli Palestinian Bereaved Families for Peace, and political parties Hadash, Balad and the United Arab List.

A poll taken 28 July by the Dahuf Institute for the newspaper Yedioth Ahronoth found that seven in ten (71%) supported using more military force in Lebanon. Asked what Israel’s next step should be, 48 percent said fight until Hezbollah is destroyed, 30 percent said drive the militia away from the border, and 21 percent said to negotiate with Hezbollah.

On 31 August, mass rally of tens of thousands of people in Rabin Square called for the release of the three kidnapped IDF soldiers.

=== Jordan ===
Various demonstrations were also held in Jordan, most were in front of the UN headquarters, embassies, and other influential organizations.

=== Kuwait ===
The day after Hezbollah's 12 July attack on Israel, Sheik Hamid al-Ali issued an informal statement titled "The Sharia position on what is going on." In it, the Kuwaiti based cleric condemned the imperial ambitions of Iran regarding Hezbollah's cross border raid.

Also on the National Flag grounds in Kuwait City hundreds gathered to express support to Hezbollah.

=== Malaysia ===
A large group of over 2,000 gathered in front of a mosque near the Petronas Twin Towers in Kuala Lumpur right after Friday prayers. The group later marched to several embassies to demand international community to intervene in the conflict and condemn Israeli aggression. A larger group also assembled in Kota Bharu to condemn the attack.

=== Netherlands ===
5,000 people demonstrated in Amsterdam against the Israeli military actions in Lebanon.

=== New Zealand ===
On Saturday 22 July, two hundred people demonstrated in Aotea Square in Auckland. One protester lowered the American flag and began waving a Palestinian flag. Police were prevented from arresting him after protestors intervened.

Over the weekend 4-7 August there were mobilisations across New Zealand calling for an end to Israeli aggression.

In Auckland around 300 people braved pouring rain to hold a lively march and rally to call for an end to US and Israeli imperialism in the Middle East. Demonstrators staged a die-in at the US consulate before burning US and Israeli flags.

In Auckland a protest was held outside a Ponsonby mosque demanding the deportation of Palestinian and Lebanese immigrants.

In Wellington a few hundred protestors marched down Lambton Quay to the Ministry of Foreign Affairs and Trade as part of a Wellington Palestine Group protest to demand that the government not allow Israel to reopen its embassy in New Zealand until such time as Israel has ceased from the war, demolished the security fence, withdrawn from territory and help Palestinian refugees.

In Dunedin an emergency demonstration against the war attracted 250-300 people who marched on the Octagon via Labour MP Pete Hodgson's office and called on the government not to resume any military joint-training exercises with the USA (something Foreign Affairs Minister Winston Peters was trying desperately to secure on his latest trip to Washington DC).

The National Distribution Union who represent packing and distribution workers in New Zealand has condemned the Israeli air strike on a Lebanese fruit-packing warehouse that killed 33 farm workers. A group called 'Aotearoa Jews for Justice' says they stand "in solidarity with the Lebanese and Palestinian people suffering at the hands of the Israeli army."

Amnesty International held vigils for peace in six major New Zealand cities on the night of Monday 7 August calling for an end to all violence.

=== Saudi Arabia ===
Abdullah bin Jabreen, one of Saudi Arabia's leading Wahhabi sheiks, issued a strongly worded fatwa declaring it unlawful to support, join or pray for Shiite Hezbollah.

=== Sweden ===
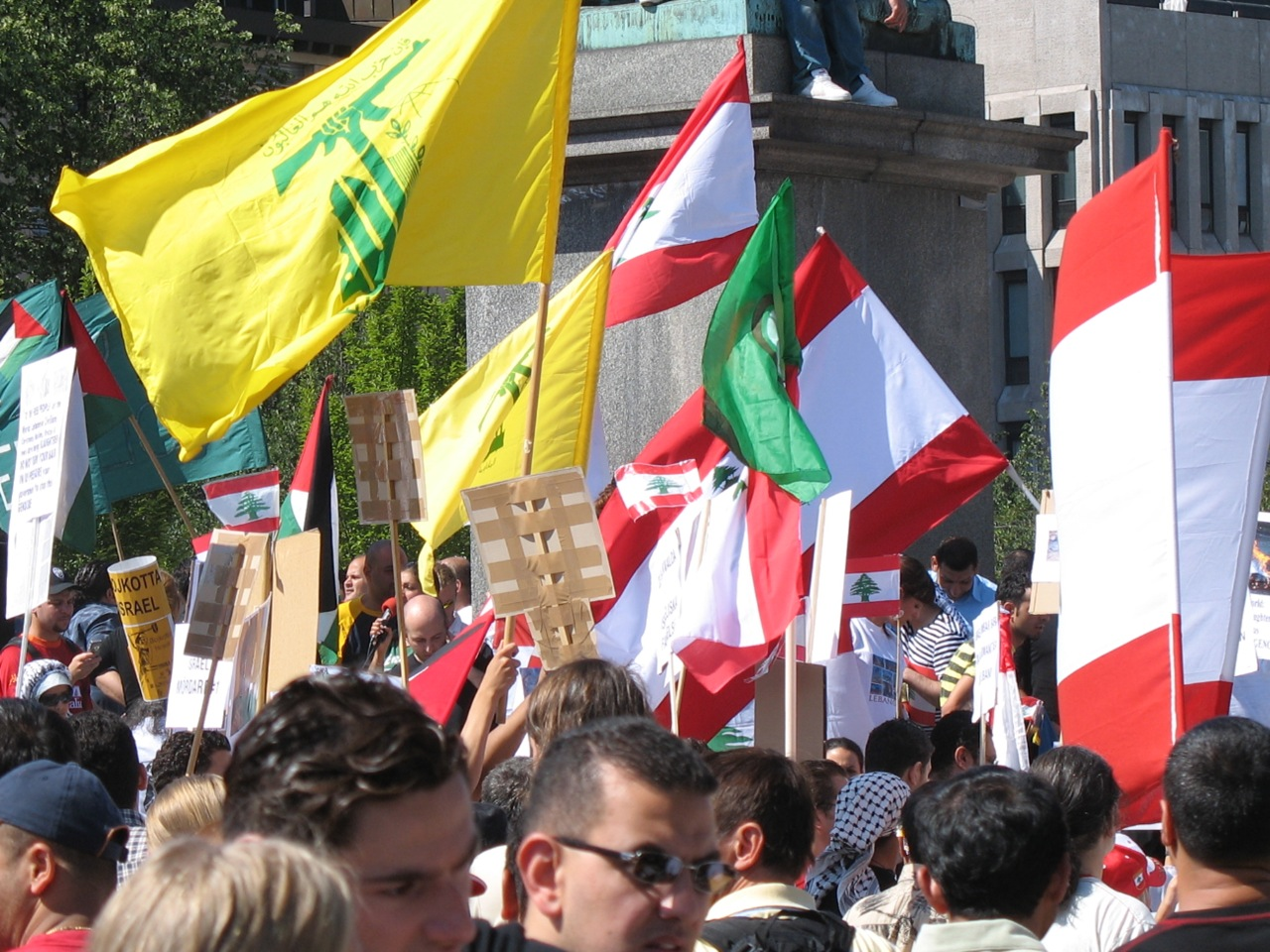
The pro-Lebanese demonstration in Stockholm

On 22 July 1,500 people marched in Stockholm against the Israeli bombings in Lebanon. Demonstrations were also held in Gothenburg, Malmö, and many other Swedish cities on the same day.

=== Norway ===
On 22 July, approximately 1,500 people demonstrated in Oslo in front of the Norwegian Parliament, in protest against Israeli military actions in Lebanon. The demonstration then proceeded to the Israeli embassy.

The same repeated on 5 August, with about 1,000 people taking part in the demonstration.

=== Syria ===
Thousands of protesters have thronged the streets of central Damascus to protest against Israel and support Hezbollah.

=== Turkey ===
Tens of thousands of people gathered in Turkey's southeastern Diyarbakır Province on 16 July to protest against the Israeli offensive in the Gaza Strip and against the Israeli attacks on Lebanon.

=== United Kingdom ===
On 22 July, between 7,000 (according to the police) and 20,000 (according to organisers) people demonstrated in London in protest against the Israeli military actions in Lebanon. Demonstrations also took place in 10 other cities across the United Kingdom, including between 1,000 and 2,000 in Manchester. A pro-Israel rally was held a day later. That weekend, an anti-Israel protest was held at a Davis Cup tennis match between Great Britain and Israel in Eastbourne.

Smaller demonstrations and vigils have also been taking place. For example, a vigil was held in Parliament Square on 18 July. Another protest was held in front of Downing Street on 28 July, organised by the Stop the War Coalition and the CND. Worker-Communist Party of Iran organised a 3-day picket against the war in front of Israeli Embassy in London from 26 to 28 July.

30 July protestors at Scotland's Prestwick Airport managed to have a chartered plane laden with bombs en route from Texas to Tel Aviv diverted to RAF Mildenhall in Suffolk, England due to their protests. The bombs are part of a series of agreed arms shipments between the United States Government and Israel and were diverted originally from Irish airspace as the Irish Government refused to allow the aircraft permission to land. The transport of weapons to Israel via British airspace has caused embarrassment for the British Government although the shipments are to continue.

=== United States ===
Israel Solidarity Rally in Los Angeles attended by over 1,000, including the Governor of California and the Mayor of Los Angeles

More than a thousand demonstrated outside of the United Nations headquarters to support Israel and denounce Hezbollah. Senator Hillary Clinton and New York Mayor Michael Bloomberg attended to show support. "We are here to show solidarity and support for Israel," said Clinton. "We will stand with Israel, because Israel is standing for American values as well as Israeli ones." She condemned Hamas, Hezbollah, Syria, and Iran. Meanwhile, 10,000 Arab Americans demonstrated against Israel's actions in Dearborn, Michigan.

In Atlanta, about 5,000 came to support Israel's defense and military efforts and denounce Hezbollah, Hamas, and al-Qaeda. Among them were US Congressman David Scott and Georgia Governor Sonny Perdue.

In Seattle, Washington, 2,000 gathered to support America's "sister-nation" (Israel) waving American and Israeli flags, denouncing the "unprovoked actions of Hezbollah and Hamas," and asserting Israel's "right to protect and defend herself... The international community must not be silent or shelter terrorists." Among the supporters were Congressman Dave Reichert, his political opponent Darcy Burner, Michael Spektor of the American Israel Public Affairs Committee, Presbyterian Reverend Leland Seese, Jr. (a long-time critic of Israel, prior), and some local rabbis. Congress Reichert received a standing ovation after saying "no other nation has given land for peace -- we now need to stand with Israel in its fight against terror and for freedom... Like Ronald Reagan, I'd like to see peace in Israel during our time."

In Los Angeles, 5,000 "Arabs and progressives", according to an activist, marched through downtown L.A. to protest against Israel and the U.S. and for the Palestinians and Lebanon. Speakers outside the federal building included the participants from the A.N.S.W.E.R. Committee, National Council of Arab Americans, Muslim American Society, Council on American Islamic Relations, Jim Lafferty of the National Lawyers Guild, Bill Paparian, the Green Party Candidate for Congress, Project Islamic Hope, KPFK 90.7 FM, Yael Koran of Women in Black, Shakeel Syed of the Islamic Shura Council of Southern California, Mahmud Ahmad of Al-Awda Palestine Right to Return Coalition, Kim Baglieri of the Alliance for Just and Lasting Peace in the Philippines, Phyllis Kim of Korean Americans for Peace, Carlos Alvarez of the Party for Socialism and Liberation and Bernie Moto of the FMLN. The rally was also against the Iraq War.

On 12 August 2006, thousands (according to the New York Times) (organizers say 30,000), of mostly Muslims "rallied near the White House on Saturday to protest what they described as Israeli aggression in Lebanon and the United States' unwavering support for Israel." Speakers included former Attorney General (and legal defender of Saddam Hussein) Ramsey Clark, Muslim American Society Freedom Foundation, Partnership for Civil Justice, A.N.S.W.E.R. Coalition, National Council of Arab Americans, Osama Siblani Publisher at Arab American News, and Dr. Clovis Maksoud the former ambassador from the Arab League to the U.N, American-Arab Anti-Discrimination Committee. This was the largest rally against Israeli aggression in America since the Gaza and Lebanon conflicts began. The protest was one of several held around the country. When a woman started to burn an Israeli flag at one such rally in San Francisco, police rushed toward her and then other demonstrators joined the fracas, resulting in one arrest. A counter protest of a few hundred people was organized by San Francisco Voice for Israel in San Francisco.

In Los Angeles, 6,000 to 10,000 (some sources say 6,000-8,000, many say 10,000) demonstrated in support of Israel and against Hezbollah, waving Israeli and American flags. The pro-Israel rally included Hollywood actor and California Governor Arnold Schwarzenegger, Los Angeles Mayor Antonio Villaraigosa, Councilman Jack Weiss, Congressman Howard Berman (D), County Supervisor Zev Yaroslavsky, Wiesenthal Institute Head Rabbi Marvin Hier, Israeli General Consul Ehud Danoch, candidate for Calif. State Assembly Steven Sion (R), various rabbis and heads of Christian churches. A counter-rally of Arab Muslims waving Palestinian and Lebanese flags was on the opposite side of the street and numbered about 100. Large police forces guarded the area and streets and prevented Arab Hizbullah/Hamas supporters from entering the demonstration. The governor stated at the rally, "All of California stands by Israel in its just struggle against extremist Islamic terror organizations who oppose all peace arrangements." The speakers at the rally harshly condemned Hizbullah, Hamas, Iran and Syria, and stressed Israel's right to self-defense. Later, at a conference with ten rabbis from various parts of California including David Wolpe, Governor Schwarzenegger said he attended the rally in part because he had never heard an Israeli leader call for the destruction of an Arab or Muslim nation, which he could not say the same about Arab and Muslim leaders of countries.

A demonstration of about 1,000 in San Francisco in support of Israel was attended by Senator Dianne Feinstein, and Arab-American writer Nonie Darwish. Feinstein stated "Hezbollah, Damascus, Tehran could end this now with the release all of Israeli soldiers and by stopping the rocket attacks on Israeli communities," and said the groups have a greater agenda. Darwish received a loud applause after stating: "What is disproportionate is the indifferent reaction of the international community whenever Israel is attacked by terrorists!" Todd Chretien and Marsha Feinland of the smaller Green Party and Peace and Freedom Party who were running against Feinstein had a small group of supporters opposing the pro-Israel rally.

In Baltimore, Maryland, over 700 people arrived in Baltimore's Holocaust Memorial to show solidarity with Israel. Governor Robert Ehrlich, Mayor Martin O'Malley, and Congressman Ben Cardin were a few of the politicians who spoke. (See here for pictures from the Baltimore rally.)

Seattle Jewish Federation shooting - Naveed Afzal Haq (a Pakistani American) walked into the Jewish Federation of Greater Seattle building and shouted "I'm a Muslim American; I'm angry at Israel" before shooting six women, killing one.

- 19 July 2006, Delaware Senator Joe Biden (D) said in an interview on Larry King Live that the conflict "may be a real opportunity to change the dynamic of the region... This is the first time that everyone's on the same page.

"Not only are the Hezbollah holding Israeli soldiers hostage, but they're holding Lebanon hostage. Half the Lebanese people are angry at Hezbollah. The whole Sunni world understands this is a major gambit by Iran.

"France and the European countries are united in this effort. And so, if we're smart, we have an opportunity to use this as a very serious uniting effort to close down Syria and put inordinate pressure on Hezbollah." KING: Is Hezbollah the prime villain? BIDEN: Absolutely, positively, unequivocally...

- ABC News/Washington Post Poll. 3–6 August 2006. N=1,002 adults in the US. MoE ± 3 (for all adults). 46% said Israel and Hezbollah are both responsible for the conflict in Lebanon, 39% said Hezbollah is most to blame, while only 7% said Israel is; 6% were unsure, and 1% felt otherwise. The same poll found that 58% blamed Hezbollah for the civilian casualties in Lebanon for locating its fighters and rocket launchers in civilian areas, while 21% blame Israel for bombing Hezbollah targets those areas; 10% both, 9% unsure, and 2% felt neither were to blame.
- A worldwide online poll conducted by Bill O'Reilly and sponsored by MSNDirect.com in August 2006 found that of the over 50,000 voters (majority American), 96% say that Israel should not negotiate with Hezbollah or their demands. Only 4 percent said yes.
- In a full-page ad published in the Los Angeles Times, The Hollywood Reporter, and the Variety

Nicole Kidman along with 84 other Hollywood people signed their names on what read:

"We the undersigned are pained and devastated by the civilian casualties in Israel and Lebanon caused by terrorist actions initiated by terrorist organisations such as Hezbollah and Hamas.

"If we do not succeed in stopping terrorism around the world, chaos will rule and innocent people will continue to die.

"We need to support democratic societies and stop terrorism at all costs."

Other film gurus that signed included actors: Michael Douglas, Dennis Hopper, Sylvester Stallone, Bruce Willis, Danny DeVito, Don Johnson, James Woods, Kelly Preston, Patricia Heaton and William Hurt; and directors: Ridley Scott, Tony Scott, Michael Mann, Dick Donner and Sam Raimi; as well as star tennis player Serena Williams and media tycoon Rupert Murdoch. Supporters of the ad included chairman and owner of Paramount Pictures, Sumner Redstone, and billionaire mogul, Haim Saban.

- American actor-writer-producer Bill Maher, despite heavily criticizing President Bush in the interview, said on 28 August 2006 on Larry King Live: Absolutely and the proof of that is that they ask Israel to maintain a level of restraint when they're attacked that no other country would ever be asked to uphold.

I mean can you imagine if there was a terrorist organization that took over the country on our northern border, which would be Canada, and they started shelling us in our northern cities and Minnesota and Bangor, Maine was being shelled, what do you think George Bush would do?

I think he would nuke them before breakfast. And, look, you know I don't like George Bush but he is the best president we've ever had on Israel because for some reason he gets that.

... the media always likes the underdog or what they perceive as the underdog, not that they're really the underdog at this point. Did you see those pictures of Hezbollah handing out cash?

... So, you know, I feel really bad for Lebanon. I'm sorry you got your country all bombed up. But, you know, when you let a terrorist organization take over your country that's what's going to happen. I'll tell you two Arab countries that never get bombed, Egypt and Jordan, because they made a peace treaty with Israel. Try it.

According to an NBC-Wall Street Journal poll, when asked whether they approve or disapprove of the job that George W. Bush is doing in handling the military conflict between Israel and the Lebanese group Hezbollah, 45% of Americans approved, 39% disapproved, and 16% were not sure. When asked to think about the events of the past week in the Middle East, 54% of Americans answered that their sympathies are more with Israel, 11% answered more with Arab nations, 11% both, 11% neither, and 13% not sure.

In August 2006, University of Chicago political scientist John Mearsheimer accused Israel of using the kidnapping of its soldiers by Hezbollah as an excuse to attack Lebanon and start the 2006 Lebanon War. Mearsheimer stated that "Israel had been planning to strike at Hezbollah for months. Key Israelis had briefed the administration about their intentions." When asked if there was any "hard evidence" to support his statements, Mearsheimer cited the "public record" and "Israeli civilian strategists", then repeated the allegation that Israel was seeking "a cover for launching this offensive."

Reporter and columnist Michael Totten wrote that "Hezbollah lost and Hezbollah knows it." He questioned why Hezbollah did not attack Israel when the IDF attacked Hamas in Gaza in 2008, and noted that most of Nasrallah’s supporters "want Hezbollah to deter Israeli invasions, not to invite Israeli invasions". Totten concluded that Nasrallah's boasts "play well in much of the Arab world", but that the 2006 "victory" seemed "empty at home."

=== Yemen ===
Thousands came together in the capital city, Sana'a, on 19 July to protest the Israeli attacks against the Palestinians and Lebanese. The demonstration was organized by the ruling and opposition political parties.

== Reactions by special interest groups ==
=== American Israel Public Affairs Committee ===
On 18 July the US Senate passed S.Res. 534 98-0 by unanimous Consent, "Condemning Hezbollah and Hamas and their state sponsors and supporting Israel's exercise of its right to self-defense". Resolution 534 calls for the release of Israeli soldiers who are being held captive by Hezbollah or Hamas; condemns the governments of Iran and Syria for their continued support for Hezbollah and Hamas; urges all sides to protect innocent civilian life and infrastructure; and strongly supports the use of all diplomatic means available to free the captured Israeli soldiers. On 20 July 2006, the US House of Representatives passed resolution 921 supporting Israel’s right to defend itself and condemning attacks against the State of Israel. The final vote was 410 to 8 in favour of the resolution.

Following the House passing Resolution 921 and the previous passage of Senate Resolution 534 the lobbying body American Israel Public Affairs Committee (AIPAC) issued a press release praising the results and asserted:

"Recent polls indicate that U.S. support for Israel is at an all-time high and the resolutions are a reflection of the American people's desire to stand by Israel in this time of crisis."

On 30 July Congress sent a letter to the EU's Head of Foreign Policy Javier Solana, asking that the EU add Hezbollah to its list of illegal terrorist organisations. The letter, signed by 210 members of Congress.

"We were dismayed to hear your 19 July assertion that the EU lacked 'sufficient data' to add Hizbullah to its terrorist list."

Members of Congress had already called on the EU, via a 2005 resolution, to add Hezbollah to the list. AIPAC issued a statement Friday following the signing of the letter in Congress, saying that:

"If the European Union is serious about its support for international measures calling for Hizbullah's disarmament, designating Hizbullah a terrorist organization is a necessary step in that process."

The EU declined the requests.

AIPAC also had a role in defending the Israeli war effort to the American public. A 27 July memo issued by AIPAC titled "Beirut Largely Unscathed as Israel Targets Hezbollah Strongholds," advanced the idea that through "surgical strike" bombing the damage reported in other media was exaggerated. AIPAC asserted that following IDF bombing of the southern districts of Beirut,

"an overwhelming majority of the city remains untouched."

On 2 August AIPAC asserted in a press release titled "The Bekka (sic) Valley: A Terrorist Epicenter", that the Bekaa valley area under bombardment by the IDF at that time was home to a number of anti-Israel factions. AIPACs middle east analyst, Josh Block was quoted in the press release as saying:

"[It's] similar to a university setting, terrorists from every corner of the international community have come together in the Bekaa Valley training camps to learn how to conduct lethal operations and utilize various types of weapons."

AIPAC then went on to list the groups it believed were operating from the region which included the Red Army Faction, Red Brigade, and the Japanese Red Army. One commentator remarked:

"Much of the material cited by AIPAC to back up the press release is of dubious veracity, and the information that links these terrorist groups to the Bekaa Valley region is years or even decades old... AIPAC's goal, it seems to me, is to demonstrate that Israel's campaign in Lebanon is targeting an international, globally-linked terrorist alliance that threatens not only the Jewish state, but the West in general."

=== Christians United for Israel ===
There were also calls of support from a second Zionist focused lobby grouping headed by John Hagee the founder and senior pastor of the 18,000-member evangelical Cornerstone Church in San Antonio, Texas. Hagee, author of "Jerusalem Countdown: A Warning to the World", had engaged in meetings with various congress members and launched a Christian pro-Israel lobby which he said would rival AIPAC. The five-month-old, 3,000 strong pro-Israel evangelical group Christians United for Israel (CUFI) attended a "Washington/Israel summit" during the week beginning 17 July in an effort to lobby for greater congressional and senate support for Israel, and the Israeli war effort. Hagee was also reportedly setting up an "Israel Rapid Response" network of e-mails, faxes and phone calls to mobilize voters. Over the years, Hagee has reportedly donated $8.5 million US to support Israeli hospitals and orphanages and has helped 12,000 Russian Jews move to Israel.
