= Canadian Citizenship Act, 1946 =

Canadian 1946 citizenship legislation

Parliament of Canada
- Long title: An Act Respecting Citizenship, Naturalization and the Status of Aliens
- Citation: SC 1946, c. 15
- Enacted by: Parliament of Canada
- Assented to: 27 June 1946
- Commenced: 1 January 1947
- Repealed: 15 February 1977

Legislative history
- Introduced by: Paul Martin, Sr., Secretary of State for Canada
- First reading: 2 April 1946

Repealed by
- Canadian Citizenship Act, 1976
- Status: Repealed

The Canadian Citizenship Act (French: Loi sur la citoyenneté canadienne) was a statute passed by the Parliament of Canada in 1946 which created the legal status of Canadian citizenship. The Act defined who were Canadian citizens, separate and independent from the status of the British subject and repealed earlier Canadian legislation relating to Canadian nationals and citizens as sub-classes of British subject status.

The Act came into force on 1 January 1947 and was in force for thirty years, until replaced on 15 February 1977 by a new statute, the Canadian Citizenship Act, 1976, now known as the Citizenship Act.

== Pre-1947: British subjects and Canadian citizens ==
The status of "Canadian citizen" was originally created under the Immigration Act, 1910 to designate those British subjects who were born, naturalized, or domiciled in Canada. All other British subjects required permission to land. "Domicile" was defined as having been resident in Canada for three years, excluding any time spent in prisons or mental institutions.

A separate status of "Canadian national" was created under the Canadian Nationals Act, 1921, which was defined as being a Canadian citizen as defined above, their wives, and any children (fathered by such citizens) that had not yet landed in Canada.

However, these concepts were merely subsets of the status of "British subject", which was regulated by the Imperial British Nationality and Status of Aliens Act 1914, which was adopted in Canada by the Naturalization Act, 1914.

== Creation of Canadian Citizenship (January 1947) ==
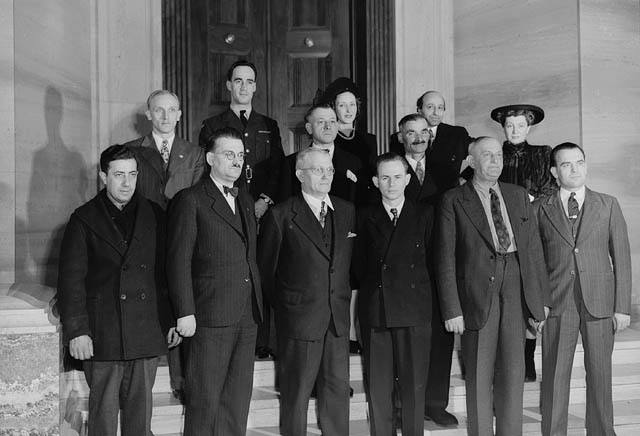
First Canadian Citizenship ceremony on 3 January 1947 at the Supreme Court of Canada

Canadian citizenship, as a status separate from British nationality, was created by the Canadian Citizenship Act of 1946, which came into effect on 1 January 1947. (Although passed in 1946, it is often referred to as the "1947 Citizenship Act" because it came into force in 1947.)

=== Immediate effect ===
Canadian citizenship was generally conferred immediately on the following persons:

- a person who was born in Canada (or on a Canadian ship) before 1947, and had not become an alien before 1947;
- a person other than a natural-born Canadian citizen:
  - who was granted, or whose name was included in, a certificate of naturalization under any act of the Parliament of Canada and had not become an alien at the commencement of the Act, or
  - who was a British subject who had acquired Canadian domicile (i.e., five years' residence in Canada as a landed immigrant) before 1947
- a British subject who lived in Canada for 20 years immediately before 1947 and was not, on 1 January 1947, under order of deportation
- women who were married to a Canadian before 1947 and who entered Canada as a landed immigrant before 1947
- children born outside Canada to a Canadian father (or mother, if born out of wedlock) before 1947

In the latter two cases, a "Canadian" was a British subject who would have been considered a Canadian citizen if the 1947 Act had come into force immediately before the marriage or birth (as the case may be). Where the child born outside Canada was not a minor (i.e., was not under 21 years in age) at the time the Act came into force, proof of landed immigrant status was required to confirm Canadian citizenship.

=== Acquisition of citizenship after 1947 ===
In addition to those people who became Canadian citizens upon the coming into force of the Act, citizenship afterwards was generally acquired as follows:

- birth in Canada (except where either parent is a representative of a foreign government, their employee, or anyone granted diplomatic privileges or immunities and neither parent is a citizen or permanent resident)
- naturalization in Canada after five years' residence as a landed immigrant
- grant of citizenship to a foreign woman married to a Canadian man after one year's residence as a landed immigrant
- grant of citizenship to women who lost British subject status prior to 1947 upon marriage to a foreign man or his subsequent naturalization
- registration of a child born outside Canada to a Canadian "responsible parent" (being the father, if the child was born in wedlock, or the mother, if the child was born out of wedlock and was residing with the mother, if the father was deceased or if custody of the child had been awarded to the mother by court order)

=== Newfoundland and citizenship ===
A notable addition to the 1947 Act occurred when Newfoundland joined Canada in 1949. All native or naturalized Newfoundlanders were granted Canadian citizenship under the laws stated in the Citizenship Act, upon the date of union on 1 April 1949.

=== Inuit and First Nations from Alaska ===
In 1956, Parliament amended the Citizenship Act to retroactively grant citizenship to a small group of First Nations and Inuit who had entered Canada from Alaska at some point before 1947 but had not made formal application to enter Canada. The amendment provided that anyone who was defined as "Indians" (First Nations) or "Eskimos" (Inuit), and who were not natural-born citizens, but were domiciled in Canada on 1 January 1947, and had been resident in Canada for ten years as at 1 January 1956, were granted citizenship retroactive to 1 January 1947.

== Loss of citizenship ==
Loss of Canadian citizenship generally occurred in the following cases:

- naturalization outside Canada
- in the case of a minor, naturalization of a parent
- service in foreign armed forces
- naturalized Canadians who lived outside Canada for 10 years and did not file a declaration of retention
- where a Canadian had acquired that status by descent from a Canadian parent, and who was either not lawfully admitted to Canada for permanent residence on the commencement of the Act or was born outside Canada afterwards, loss of citizenship could occur on the person's 22nd birthday unless the person had filed a declaration of retention between their 21st and 22nd birthday and renounced any previous nationality they possessed.

Although Canada restricted dual citizenship between 1947 and 1977, there were some situations where Canadians could nevertheless legally possess another citizenship. For example, migrants becoming Canadian citizens were not asked to formally prove that they had ceased to hold the nationality of their former country. Similarly children born in Canada to non-Canadian parents were not under any obligation to renounce a foreign citizenship they had acquired by descent. Holding a foreign passport did not in itself cause loss of Canadian citizenship.

== See also ==
- List of acts of the Parliament of Canada
- Canadian nationality law
