= British Nationality Act =

Stock short title used for UK legislation

British Nationality Act is a stock short title used for legislation in the United Kingdom relating to nationality.

The Bill for an Act with this short title will have been known as a British Nationality Bill during its passage through Parliament.

== List ==
- The British Nationality and Status of Aliens Act 1914 (4 & 5 Geo. 5. c. 17)
- The British Nationality Act 1948 (11 & 12 Geo. 6. c. 56)
- The British Nationality Act 1958 (6 & 7 Eliz. 2. c. 10)
- The British Nationality Act 1964 (c. 22)
- The British Nationality (No. 2) Act 1964 (c. 54)
- The British Nationality Act 1965 (c. 34)
- The British Nationality Act 1981 (c. 61)
- The British Nationality (Falkland Islands) Act 1983 (c. 6)
- The British Nationality (Hong Kong) Act 1990 (c. 34)
- The British Nationality (Hong Kong) Act 1997 (c. 20)
- The British Nationality (Irish Citizens) Act 2024 (c. 19)

The British Subjects Acts 1708 to 1772 was the collective title of the following acts:

- The Foreign Protestants Naturalization Act 1708 (7 Ann. c. 5)
- The British Nationality Act 1730 (4 Geo. 2. c. 21)
- The British Subjects Act 1751 (25 Geo. 2. c. 39)
- The British Nationality Act 1772 (13 Geo. 3. c. 21)

== See also ==
- History of British nationality law
- Immigration, Asylum and Nationality Act 2006
- List of short titles
