= Spring Branch =

Spring Branch may refer to:

- A spring branch, also known as a spring creek, a stream carrying the outflow of a spring to a nearby primary stream
- Spring Branch (Murderkill River tributary), a stream in Kent County, Delaware
- Spring Branch (Little Blue River tributary), a stream in Missouri
- Spring Branch, Comal County, Texas, city north of San Antonio
- Spring Branch, Houston, a community in Houston, Texas
  - Spring Branch Independent School District, serving Spring Branch in Houston and nearby areas

== See also ==
- Springs Branch (disambiguation)
