= Thanet =

Thanet may refer to:

- Isle of Thanet, a former island, now a peninsula, at the most easterly point of Kent, England
- Thanet District, a local government district containing the island
- Thanet College, former name of East Kent College
- Thanet Canal, a short branch of the Leeds and Liverpool Canal
- Earl of Thanet, a title in the Peerage of England created in 1628
- Thanet Formation, a geological formation found in the London Basin of southeastern England
- HMS Thanet (H29), an S-class destroyer of the Royal Navy
- Thanet Wind Farm, an offshore wind farm 7 miles (11 km) off the coast of Thanet district in Kent, England

== See also ==
- Thanetian, in the ICS Geologic timescale, the latest age or uppermost stratigraphic stage of the Paleocene Epoch
