= Denization =

Citizenship process in the UK

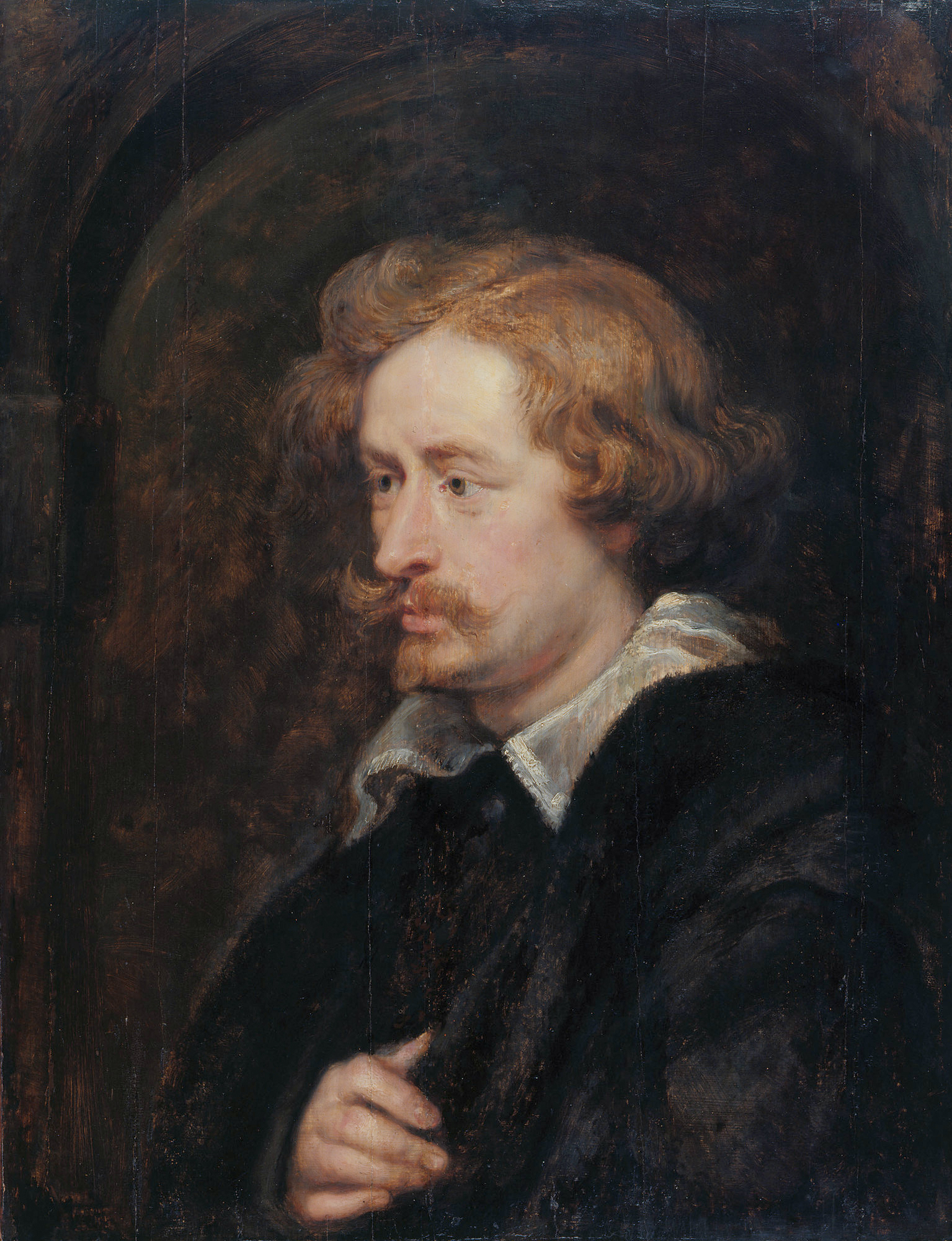
Anthony van Dyck, who became a denizen in 1638

Denization is an obsolete or defunct process in England and Ireland and the later Kingdom of Great Britain, the United Kingdom, and the British Empire, dating back to the 13th century, by which an alien (foreigner), through letters patent, became a denizen, thereby obtaining certain rights otherwise normally enjoyed only by the King's (or Queen's) subjects, including the right to hold land. The denizen was neither a subject (with citizenship or nationality) nor an alien, but had a status akin to permanent residency today. While one could become a subject via naturalisation, this required a private act of Parliament (or latterly of a colonial legislature); in contrast, denization was cheaper, quicker, and simpler. Denization fell into obsolescence when the British Nationality and Status of Aliens Act 1914 (4 & 5 Geo. 5. c. 17) simplified the naturalisation process.

Denization occurred by a grant of letters patent, an exercise of the royal prerogative. Denizens paid a fee and took an oath of allegiance to the crown. For example, when Venetian mariner Gabriel Corbet was granted letters of denization in 1431 for service upon the seas to Henry V and Henry VI, he was required to pay 40 shillings into the hanaper for the privilege.

The status of denizen allowed a foreigner to purchase property, although a denizen could not inherit property. Sir William Blackstone wrote "A denizen is a kind of middle state, between an alien and a natural-born subject, and partakes of both." The denizen had limited political rights: he could vote, but could not be a member of parliament or hold any civil or military office of trust. Denizenship has also been compared to the Roman civitas sine suffragio, although the rights of denizens were restricted by the Act of Settlement 1701, not by common or immemorial law.

Denization was expressly preserved by the Naturalization Act 1870 (33 & 34 Vict. c. 14) and by s25 of the British Nationality and Status of Aliens Act 1914 (4 & 5 Geo. 5. c. 17). (Note: See Early British Nationality Law) According to the British Home Office, the last denization was granted to the Dutch painter Lawrence Alma-Tadema in 1873; the Home Office considered it obsolete when the Prince of Pless applied for it in 1933, and instructed him to apply for naturalisation instead. The British Nationality Act 1948, a major reform of citizenship law in Britain, made no mention of denization and neither abolished nor preserved the practice.

Denization, as an exercise of royal power, was applicable throughout the British dominion to all British subjects. That is, it was exercisable in the colonies. For example, denization occurred in the colony of New South Wales. As in Britain, the practice became obsolete to naturalisation, with the last known denization in 1848.

The term denizen may also refer to any national of a country, whether citizen or non-citizen, with a right to remain in and return to the country. In the United States, unassimilated Native Americans, although born on U.S. soil, were not deemed to be citizens of the United States or any state, but of a domestic dependent nation contained within the United States. However, in 1924 the Indian Citizenship Act, made all Native Americans born in the United States and its territories American citizens.

== See also ==
- Metic
- Permanent resident
