= Naturalization Act 1870 =

Act of the Parliament of the United Kingdom

Naturalization Act 1870 (Note: Section 1.)
- Act of Parliament
- Parliament of the United Kingdom
- Long title: An Act to amend the Law relating to the legal condition of Aliens and British Subjects.
- Citation: 33 & 34 Vict. c. 14
- Introduced by: William Wood, 1st Baron Hatherley (Lords)
- Territorial extent: United Kingdom

Dates
- Royal assent: 12 May 1870
- Commencement: 12 May 1870 (Note: The Acts of Parliament (Commencement) Act 1793.)
- Repealed: 1 January 1915
Other legislation
Amends	See § Repealed enactments
Repeals/revokes	See § Repealed enactments
Amended by	Naturalization Oath Act 1870; Statute Law Revision Act 1883; Foreign Marriage Act 1892; Naturalization Act 1895
Repealed by	British Nationality and Status of Aliens Act 1914

Status: Repealed

History of passage through Parliament

Records of Parliamentary debate relating to the statute from Hansard

Text of statute as originally enacted

The Naturalization Act 1870 (33 & 34 Vict. c. 14) was an act of the Parliament of the United Kingdom that amended and consolidated enactments relating to British nationality.

The act introduced administrative procedures for naturalising non-British subjects naturalisation, but preserved the process of denization. The act also introduced the concept of renunciation of British nationality, and provided for the first time that British women who married foreign men should lose their British nationality. This was a radical break from the common law doctrine that citizenship could not be removed, renounced, or revoked.

== Passage ==
The Naturalization Bill had its first reading in the House of Lords on 25 February 1870, presented by the Lord Chancellor, William Wood, 1st Baron Hatherley. The bill had its second reading in the House of Lords on 3 March 1870 and was committed to a committee of the whole house, which met on 10 March 1870 and 17 March 1870 and reported on 17 March 1870, with amendments. The amended bill had its third reading in the House of Lords on 18 March 1870 and passed, without amendments.

The bill had its first reading in the House of Commons on 22 March 1870. The bill had its second reading in the House of Commons on 31 March 1870 and was committed to a committee of the whole house, which met on 25 April 1870 and 19 April 1870 and reported on 29 April 1870, with amendments. The amended bill had its third reading in the House of Commons on 2 May 1870 and passed.

The amended bill was considered and agreed to by the House of Lords on 9 May 1870.

The bill was granted royal assent on 12 May 1870.

== Provisions ==
=== Repealed enactments ===
Section 18 of the act repealed 18 enactments, listed in the schedule to the act. Section 18 of the act also included safeguards to preserve any rights, things done, liabilities, penalties, forfeits or investigations before the passing of the act.

Acts wholly repealed, other than Acts of the Irish Parliament
Citation	Short title	Title	Extent of repeal
7 Jas. 1. c. 2	Naturalisation and Restoration of Blood Act 1609	An Act that all such as are to be naturalized or restored in blood shall first receive the sacrament of the Lord's Supper, and the oath of allegiance, and the oath of supremacy.	The whole act.
11 Will. 3. c. 6 (Note: 11 & 12 Wm. 3. (Ruff))	Aliens Act 1698	An Act to enable His Majesty's natural-born subjects to inherit the estate of their ancestors, either lineal or collateral, notwithstanding their father or mother were aliens.	The whole act.
13 Geo. 2. c. 7	Naturalization Act 1739	An Act for naturalizing such foreign Protestants and others therein mentioned, as are settled or shall settle in any of His Majesty's colonies in America.	The whole act.
20 Geo. 2. c. 44	Aliens Act 1746	An Act to extend the provisions of an Act made in the thirteenth year of His present Majesty's reign, intituled "An Act for "naturalizing foreign Protestants and "others therein mentioned, as are settled "or shall settle in any of His Majesty's "colonies in America, to other foreign "Protestants who conscientiously scruple "the taking of an oath."	The whole act.
13 Geo. 3. c. 25	Naturalization Act 1772	An Act to explain two Acts of Parliament, one of the thirteenth year of the reign of His late Majesty, "for naturalizing such "foreign Protestants and others as are "settled or shall settle in any of His "Majesty's colonies in America," and the other of the second year of the reign of His present Majesty, "for naturalizing "such foreign Protestants as have served "or shall serve as officers or soldiers in "His Majesty's Royal American regiment, "or as engineers in America."	The whole act.
14 Geo. 3. c. 84	Naturalization Act 1774	An Act to prevent certain inconveniences that may happen by bills of naturalization.	The whole act.
16 Geo. 3. c. 52	Natural-born Children of Aliens Act 1776	An Act to declare His Majesty's natural-born subjects inheritable to the estates of their ancestors, whether lineal or collateral, in that part of Great Britain called Scotland, notwithstanding their father or mother were aliens.	The whole act.
6 Geo. 4. c. 67	Naturalization and Restoration of Blood Act 1825	An Act to alter and amend an Act passed in the seventh year of the reign of His Majesty King James the First, intituled "An Act that all such as are to be "naturalized or restored in blood shall "first receive the sacrament of the Lord's "Supper and the oath of allegiance and "the oath of supremacy."	The whole act.
7 & 8 Vict. c. 66	Aliens Act 1844	An Act to amend the laws relating to aliens.	The whole act.
10 & 11 Vict. c. 83	Aliens Act 1847	An Act for the naturalization of aliens.	The whole act.

Acts of the Irish Parliament wholly repealed.
Citation	Short Title	Title	Extent of Repeal
14 & 15 Chas. 2 Sess. 4. c. 13 (I)	N/A	An Act for encouraging Protestant strangers and other to inhabit and plant in the Kingdom of Ireland.	The whole act.
2 Anne. c. 14 (I)	N/A	An Act for naturalizing of all Protestant strangers in this kingdom.	The whole act.
19 & 20 Geo. 3. c. 29 (I)	Naturalization Act 1779	An Act for naturalizing such foreign merchants, traders, artificers, artizans, manufacturers, workmen, seamen, farmers, and others as shall settle in this kingdom.	The whole act.
23 & 24 Geo. 3. c. 38 (I)	Naturalization Act 1783	An Act for extending the provisions of an Act passed in this kingdom in the nineteenth and twentieth years of His Majesty's reign, intituled "An Act for naturalizing "such foreign merchants, traders, artificers, "artizans, manufacturers, workmen, seamen, farmers, and others as shall settle "in this kingdom."	The whole act.
36 Geo. 3. c. 48 (I)	Naturalization Act 1796	An Act to explain and amend an Act, intituled "An Act for naturalizing such "foreign merchants, traders, artificers, "artizans, manufacturers, workmen, seamen, farmers, and others who shall "settle in this kingdom."	The whole act.

Acts partially repealed
Citation	Short title	Title	Extent of Repeal
4 Geo. 1. c. 9 (I)	N/A	An Act for reviving, continuing, and amending several statutes made in this kingdom heretofore temporary.	So far as it makes perpetual the Act of 2 Anne, c. 14.
6 Geo. 4. c. 50	Juries Act 1825	An Act for consolidating and amending the laws relative to Jurors and Juries.	The whole of sect. 47.
3 & 4 Will. 4. c. 91	Juries (Ireland) Act 1833	An Act consolidating and amending the laws relating to Jurors and Juries in Ireland.	The whole of sect. 37.

== Subsequent developments ==
Courtenay Ilbert described the act as a consolidation act, given that the act, which amended British nationality law, also consolidated various enactments relating to that particular branch of law.

Section eighteen and the schedule to the act were repealed by section 1 of, and the schedule to, the Statute Law Revision Act 1883 (46 & 47 Vict. c. 39), which came into force on 25 August 1883.

The whole act was repealed by section 28(1) of, and the third schedule to, the British Nationality and Status of Aliens Act 1914 (4 & 5 Geo. 5. c. 17), which came into force on 1 January 1915.
