= Naturalization Act 1714 =

Act of the Parliament of Great Britain

- Act of Parliament
- Parliament of Great Britain
- Long title: An act to explain the act made in the twelfth year of the reign of King William the Third, intituled, "An act for the further limitation of the crown, and better securing the rights and liberties of the subject."
- Citation: 1 Geo. 1. St. 2. c. 4
- Territorial extent: Great Britain

Dates
- Royal assent: 20 July 1715
- Commencement: 17 March 1715 (Note: Start of session.)
- Repealed: 15 July 1867
Other legislation
Amends	Act of Settlement 1700
Amended by	Aliens Act 1844
Repealed by	Statute Law Revision Act 1867
Relates to	Foreign Protestants Naturalization Act 1708; Naturalization Act 1711

Status: Repealed

Text of statute as originally enacted

The Naturalization Act 1714 (1 Geo. 1. St. 2. c. 4), printed under the full title An act to explain the act made in the twelfth year of the reign of King William the Third, intituled, "An act for the further limitation of the crown, and better securing the rights and liberties of the subject.", was an act of the Parliament of Great Britain. The act was passed in 1714, as part of the first session under the new reign of King George I of Great Britain, at the outset of the Hanoverian dynasty. According to historians of British nationality and citizenship, this "Act of 1714 prescribed that no Bill of naturalisation should be received in either House unless it included a clause embodying the disabilities of the Act of Settlement (12 & 13 Will. 3. c. 2)." (In this case, "disabilities" refers to the legal sense of disqualification or disallowal.)

That is, the act of 1714 continued a string of laws dating back to William and Mary, all related to the barring of Catholics from taking the throne in England or Ireland, holding public office, and other rights and privileges of British subjects. These laws would slowly be repealed or replaced with the Catholic emancipation laws of the 1760s and onward, the Aliens Act 1844 (7 & 8 Vict. c. 66), and related legislation from British nationality and citizenship history.

The text of the act has two primary parts. Part 1 extended the Act of Settlement by stipulating that "no person born out of the kingdoms of England, Scotland, or Ireland, or the dominions thereunto belonging, although he be naturalized or made a denizen, except such as are born of English parents, should be capable to be of the privy council, or a member of either house of parliament, or to enjoy any office or place of trust, either civil or military, or to have any grant of lands, tenements, or hereditaments from the crown, to himself or to any others in trust for him." Part 2 then amended the earlier law by adding that this interdiction should also apply to "any person hereafter... naturalized" and that – most importantly – "no bill of naturalization shall hereafter be received in either house of parliament, unless such clause or words be first inserted or contained therein."

== Subsequent developments ==
This act was largely repealed by the Aliens Act 1844 (7 & 8 Vict. c. 66). Dummett and Nicol point out that "[w]hen in 1840 Parliament wanted to grant full rights to Prince Albert, it first had to pass a Bill amending the Act of 1714." Moreover, as another scholar notes, "section 6 of the 1844 [Aliens Act] still prohibited naturalized subjects from becoming members of the Privy Council or of either House of Parliament and made them subject to such further restrictions as might be imposed by the certificate of naturalization. Once imposed, restrictions could only by removed by grant." Thus, "in the same period in the early nineteenth century when religious barriers to naturalisation began to be removed, new limitations on undesired political views, and persons not of good character, were coming into use."

The whole act was repealed by section 1 of, and the schedule to, the Statute Law Revision Act 1867 (30 & 31 Vict. c. 59), which came into force on 15 July 1867.
