= Springs Branch =

Springs Branch may refer to

- Springs Branch Canal, a canal branch in Skipton, Yorkshire, England
- The Springs branch of the North Union Railway
- Wigan Springs Branch TMD, a railway traction maintenance depot located in Wigan, Lancashire, England
