= List of acts of the 6th session of the 13th Parliament of Great Britain =

This is a complete list of acts of the 6th session of the 13th Parliament of the United Kingdom which had regnal year 13 Geo. 3. This session met from 26 November 1772 until 1 July 1773.

For acts passed until 1707, see the list of acts of the Parliament of England and the list of acts of the Parliament of Scotland. See also the list of acts of the Parliament of Ireland.

For acts passed from 1801 onwards, see the list of acts of the Parliament of the United Kingdom. For acts of the devolved parliaments and assemblies in the United Kingdom, see the list of acts of the Scottish Parliament, the list of acts of the Northern Ireland Assembly, and the list of acts and measures of Senedd Cymru; see also the list of acts of the Parliament of Northern Ireland.

The number shown after each act's title is its chapter number. Acts are cited using this number, preceded by the year(s) of the reign during which the relevant parliamentary session was held; thus the Union with Ireland Act 1800 is cited as "39 & 40 Geo. 3. c. 67", meaning the 67th act passed during the session that started in the 39th year of the reign of George III and which finished in the 40th year of that reign. Note that the modern convention is to use Arabic numerals in citations (thus "41 Geo. 3" rather than "41 Geo. III"). Acts of the last session of the Parliament of Great Britain and the first session of the Parliament of the United Kingdom are both cited as "41 Geo. 3".

Acts passed by the Parliament of Great Britain did not have a short title; however, some of these acts have subsequently been given a short title by acts of the Parliament of the United Kingdom (such as the Short Titles Act 1896).

Before the Acts of Parliament (Commencement) Act 1793 came into force on 8 April 1793, acts passed by the Parliament of Great Britain were deemed to have come into effect on the first day of the session in which they were passed. Because of this, the years given in the list below may in fact be the year before a particular act was passed.

== 1772 ==
The sixth session of the 13th Parliament of Great Britain, which met from 26 November 1772 until 1 July 1773.

This session was also traditionally cited as 13 G. 3.

=== Public acts ===
| Short title | Citation | Royal assent |
Long title
| Importation and Exportation Act 1772 (repealed) | 13 Geo. 3. c. 1 | 4 December 1772 |
An Act for allowing the Importation of Wheat, Wheat-Flour, Rye, Rye-Meal, Barley-Meal, Oats, Oat-Meal, Peas, Beans, Tares, Callivancies, and all other Sorts of Pulse, from any Part of Europe or Africa into this Kingdom for a limited Time, free of Duty. (Repealed by Statute Law Revision Act 1871 (34 & 35 Vict. c. 116))
| Importation and Exportation (No. 2) Act 1772 (repealed) | 13 Geo. 3. c. 2 | 4 December 1772 |
An Act for allowing the Importation of Wheat, Wheat-Flour, Indian Corn, Indian Meal, Biscuit, Peas, Beans, Tares, Callivancies, and all other Sorts of Pulse, from His Majesty's Colonies in America into this Kingdom for a limited Time, free of Duty. (Repealed by Statute Law Revision Act 1871 (34 & 35 Vict. c. 116))
| Importation and Exportation (No. 3) Act 1772 (repealed) | 13 Geo. 3. c. 3 | 14 December 1772 |
An Act to prohibit the Exportation of Corn, Grain, Pease, Beans, Meal, Malt, Flour, Bread, Biscuit, and Starch; and also, the Extraction of Low Wines and Spirits from Wheat and Wheat-Flour, for a limited Time. (Repealed by Statute Law Revision Act 1871 (34 & 35 Vict. c. 116))
| Importation and Exportation (No. 4) Act 1772 (repealed) | 13 Geo. 3. c. 4 | 14 December 1772 |
An Act to continue for a further Time an Act, made in the Eighth Year of His present Majesty's Reign, (Note: (8 Geo. 3. c. ?)) intituled, "An Act to continue and amend an Act, made in the Fifth Year of the Reign of His present Majesty, (Note: (5 Geo. 3. c. ?)) intituled, 'An Act for Importation of Salted Beef, Pork, Bacon, and Butter, from Ireland, for a limited Time;'" and for allowing the Importation of Salted Beef, Pork, Bacon, and Butter, from the British Dominions in America, for a limited Time. (Repealed by Statute Law Revision Act 1871 (34 & 35 Vict. c. 116))
| Importation and Exportation (No. 5) Act 1772 (repealed) | 13 Geo. 3. c. 5 | 14 December 1772 |
An Act to continue for a further Time an Act, made in the Seventh Year of His present Majesty's Reign, intituled, "An Act to discontinue, for a limited Time, the Duties payable upon the Importation of Tallow, Hogs-Lard, and Grease;" (Note: (7 Geo. 3. c. ?)) and to permit the Importation of Salted Beef, Pork, Bacon, Hams, and Cheese, into this Kingdom, from any Part of Europe, for a limited Time, free of Duty. (Repealed by Statute Law Revision Act 1871 (34 & 35 Vict. c. 116))
| Malt Duties Act 1772 (repealed) | 13 Geo. 3. c. 6 | 21 December 1772 |
An Act for continuing and granting to His Majesty certain Duties upon Malt, Mum, Cyder, and Perry, for the Service of the Year One thousand seven hundred and seventy-three. (Repealed by Statute Law Revision Act 1871 (34 & 35 Vict. c. 116))
| Importation (No. 3) Act 1772 (repealed) | 13 Geo. 3. c. 7 | 24 December 1772 |
An Act for allowing the free Importation of Rice into this Kingdom, from any of His Majesty's Colonies in America, for a limited Time; and for encouraging the making of Starch from Rice. (Repealed by Statute Law Revision Act 1871 (34 & 35 Vict. c. 116))
| Land Tax (No. 2) Act 1772 (repealed) | 13 Geo. 3. c. 8 | 21 December 1772 |
An Act for granting an Aid to His Majesty by a Land Tax, to be raised in Great Britain, for the Service of the Year One thousand seven hundred and seventy-three. (Repealed by Statute Law Revision Act 1871 (34 & 35 Vict. c. 116))
| East India Company (No. 2) Act 1772 (repealed) | 13 Geo. 3. c. 9 | 24 December 1772 |
An Act to restrain the East India Company, for a limited Time from making any Appointment of Commissioners for superintending and regulating the Company's Affairs at their Presidencies in the East Indies. (Repealed by Statute Law Revision Act 1871 (34 & 35 Vict. c. 116))
| Mutiny (No. 2) Act 1772 (repealed) | 13 Geo. 3. c. 10 | 24 December 1772 |
An Act for Punishing Mutiny and Desertion; and for the better Payment of the Army and their Quarters. (Repealed by Statute Law Revision Act 1871 (34 & 35 Vict. c. 116))
| Marine Mutiny (No. 2) Act 1772 (repealed) | 13 Geo. 3. c. 11 | 24 December 1772 |
An Act for the Regulation of His Majesty’s Marine Forces while on Shore. (Repealed by Statute Law Revision Act 1871 (34 & 35 Vict. c. 116))
| Indemnity (No. 2) Act 1772 (repealed) | 13 Geo. 3. c. 12 | 16 March 1773 |
An Act to indemnify such Persons as have omitted to qualify themselves for Offices and Employments within the Time limited by Law, and for giving further Time for that Purpose; and to give further Time to such Persons as have omitted to make and file Affidavits of the Execution of Contracts of Clerks to Attornies and Solicitors. (Repealed by Promissory Oaths Act 1871 (34 & 35 Vict. c. 48))
| Gunpowder Mill, Tonbridge Act 1772 (repealed) | 13 Geo. 3. c. 13 | 16 March 1773 |
An Act to enable certain Persons therein-named, to continue to work a Pestle Mill heretofore employed and used in making Battle Gunpowder at Old Forge Farm, in the Parish of Tonbridge, in the County of Kent. (Repealed by Statute Law Revision Act 1871 (34 & 35 Vict. c. 116))
| West Indian Mortgages Act 1772 (repealed) | 13 Geo. 3. c. 14 | 16 March 1773 |
An Act to encourage the Subjects of Foreign States to lend Money upon the Security of Freehold or Leasehold Estates in any of His Majesty’s Colonies in the West Indies; and to render the Securities granted to such Aliens effectual for recovering Payment of the Money so to be lent by Sale of such Freehold or Leasehold Estate. (Repealed by Statute Law Revision Act 1871 (34 & 35 Vict. c. 116))
| Gravesend Streets Act 1772 (repealed) | 13 Geo. 3. c. 15 | 16 March 1773 |
An Act for paving, cleansing, and lighting, the High Street, East Street, and West Street, in the Town and Parishes of Gravesend and Milton, in the County of Kent; and for lighting the other Streets; and for removing all Encroachments and Annoyances within the said Town and Parishes. (Repealed by Gravesend and Milton Improvement Act 1833 (3 & 4 Will. 4. c. li))
| Devon Shire Hall Act 1772 | 13 Geo. 3. c. 16 | 16 March 1773 |
An Act for taking down the Shire Hall of the County of Devon, and for building a New Shire Hall in a more commodious Manner.
| Lord Blessington's Will Act 1772 (repealed) | 13 Geo. 3. c. 17 | 16 March 1773 |
An Act for making the Exemplification of, the last Will and Testament of William Earl of Blesinton, in the Kingdom of Ireland, deceased, Evidence as well in Ireland as in Great Britain. (Repealed by Statute Law (Repeals) Act 1977 (c. 18))
| Devon (Poor Relief) Act 1772 (repealed) | 13 Geo. 3. c. 18 | 16 March 1773 |
An Act to repeal an Act, passed in the Ninth Year of the Reign of His present Majesty, intituled, "An Act for the more effectual Relief of the Poor in the County of Devon;" (Note: (9 Geo. 3. c. ?)) and for other Purposes therein mentioned. (Repealed by Statute Law Revision Act 1948 (11 & 12 Geo. 6. c. 62))
| Isle of Ely, etc. (Drainage) Act 1772 (repealed) | 13 Geo. 3. c. 19 | 16 March 1773 |
An Act to amend and render more effectual an Act, passed in the Twenty-second Year of the Reign of His late Majesty King George the Second, intituled, "An Act for draining and improving certain Fen Lands within the Manor and Parishes of Upwell and Outwell, and in the Parishes of Denver and Welney, in the Isle of Ely and Counties of Cambridge, and Norfolk" (Note: (22 Geo. 2. c. ?)) so far as the same relates to the Lands lying on the South Side of Popham's Eau. (Repealed by Upwell, Outwell, Denver and Wellney Drainage Act 1801 (41 Geo. 3. (U.K.) c. xxxiv))
| Isle of Ely, etc. (Drainage) (No. 2) Act 1772 (repealed) | 13 Geo. 3. c. 20 | 16 March 1773 |
An Act to amend and render more effectual an Act, made in the Thirty-third Year of the Reign of His late Majesty King George the Second, intituled, "An Act for draining and preserving certain Fen Lands and Low Grounds in the Isle of Ely and Counties of Suffolk and Norfolk, between Mildenhall River South, Plant Load and Brandon River North, bounded on the West by the River Ouse, and on the East by Winter Load, Earswell Brook, and the Hard Lands of Mildenhall, and for empowering the Governor, Bailiffs, and Commonalty of the Company of Conservators of the Great Level of the Fens, commonly called Bedford Level, to sell certain Fen Lands lying within the Limits aforesaid, commonly called Invested Lands;" (Note: (33 Geo. 2. c. ?)) so far as the same relates to the several Fen Lands and Low Grounds lying in the First District described in the said Act. (Repealed by Isle of Ely (Mildenhall River) Drainage Act 1807 (47 Geo. 3 Sess. 2. c. lxxxiii))
| British Nationality Act 1772 (repealed) | 13 Geo. 3. c. 21 | 16 March 1773 |
An Act to extend the Provisions of an Act, made in the Fourth Year of the Reign of His late Majesty King George the Second, (Note: British Nationality Act 1730 (4 Geo. 2. c. 21)) intituled, "An Act to explain a Clause in an Act, made in the Seventh Year of the Reign of Her late Majesty Queen Anne, (Note: Foreign Protestants Naturalization Act 1708 (7 Ann. c. 5)) for naturalizing Foreign Protestants, which relates to the Children of the natural-born Subjects of the Crown of England, or of Great Britain, to the Children of such Children. (Repealed by British Nationality and Status of Aliens Act 1914 (4 & 5 Geo. 5. c. 17))
| Coal Loading (Newcastle and Sunderland) Act 1772 | 13 Geo. 3. c. 22 | 1 April 1773 |
An Act to continue an Act, made in the Sixth Year of His present Majesty, intituled, "An Act to regulate the Loading of Ships with Coals in the Ports of Newcastle and Sunderland." (Note: (6 Geo. 3. c. ?))
| Militia Pay Act 1772 (repealed) | 13 Geo. 3. c. 23 | 1 April 1773 |
An Act for defraying the Charge of the Pay and Cloathing of the Militia in that Part of Great Britain called England, for One Year, beginning the Twenty-fifth Day of March One thousand seven hundred and seventy-three. (Repealed by Statute Law Revision Act 1861 (24 & 25 Vict. c. 101))
| Mutiny in America (No. 2) Act 1772 (repealed) | 13 Geo. 3. c. 24 | 1 April 1773 |
An Act for further continuing Two Acts, made in the Sixth (Note: (6 Geo. 3. c. ?)) and Ninth (Note: (9 Geo. 3. c. ?)) Years of His Majesty's Reign, for punishing Mutiny and Desertion; and for the better Payment of the Army and their Quarters in His Majesty’s Dominions in America. (Repealed by Statute Law Revision Act 1871 (34 & 35 Vict. c. 116))
| Naturalization Act 1772 (repealed) | 13 Geo. 3. c. 25 | 1 April 1773 |
An Act to explain Two Acts of Parliament, One of the Thirteenth Year of the Reign of His late Majesty, (Note: (13 Geo. 2. c. ?)) for naturalizing such Foreign Protectants and others, as are settled, or shall settle, in any of His Majesty's Colonies in America; and the other of the Second Year of the Reign of His present Majesty, (Note: (2 Geo. 3. c. ?)) for naturalizing such Foreign Protectants as have served, or shall serve as Officers or Soldiers in His Majesty's Royal American Regiment, or as Engineers in America. (Repealed by Naturalization Act 1870 (33 & 34 Vict. c. 14))
| British Ships Act 1772 (repealed) | 13 Geo. 3. c. 26 | 1 April 1773 |
An Act for preventing Abuses in the Sale of Shares of British Built Ships to Foreigners. (Repealed by Statute Law Revision Act 1871 (34 & 35 Vict. c. 116))
| Exeter Small Debts Act 1772 (repealed) | 13 Geo. 3. c. 27 | 1 April 1773 |
An Act for the more easy and speedy Recovery of Small Debts within the City and County of the City of Exeter. (Repealed by County Courts Act 1846 (9 & 10 Vict. c. 95))
| Greenock Water Supply, etc. Act 1772 (repealed) | 13 Geo. 3. c. 28 | 1 April 1773 |
An Act for deepening, cleansing, and making more commodious the Harbours of the Town of Greenock; for supplying the Inhabitants with fresh and wholesome Water and for paving, cleansing, lighting, and watching the Streets and other publick Places within the said Town. (Repealed by Greenock Port and Harbour Act 1866 (29 & 30 Vict. c. clvi))
| Aberdeen Harbour Act 1772 (repealed) | 13 Geo. 3. c. 29 | 1 April 1773 |
An Act for deepening, cleansing, and making more commodious the Harbour of Aberdeen; for erecting new Piers and Quays therein; and for regulating Ships and Vessels trading into and going out of the said Harbour. (Repealed by Aberdeen Harbour Act 1829 (10 Geo. 4. c. xxxiv))
| King's Lynn Pilotage Act 1772 | 13 Geo. 3. c. 30 | 7 April 1773 |
An Act for the better Regulation and Government of the Pilots conducting Ships and Vessels to and out of the Port of King's Lynn, and of the Bridgemen conducting Gangs of Lighters or Barge to and from the same, and for laying down Moorings in the Harbour of the Said Port, and for preventing Mischiefs by Fire therein.
| Criminal Law Act 1772 (repealed) | 13 Geo. 3. c. 31 | 1 April 1773 |
An Act for the more effectual Execution of the Criminal Laws in the Two Parts of the United Kingdom. (Repealed by Statute Law Revision Act 1872 (35 & 36 Vict. c. 63))
| Stealing of Vegetables Act 1772 (repealed) | 13 Geo. 3. c. 32 | 1 April 1773 |
An Act for repealing so much of an Act, made in the Twenty-third Year of His late Majesty King George the Second, (Note: (23 Geo. 2. c. ?)) as relates to the preventing the stealing or destroying of Turnips; and for the more effectually preventing the stealing or destroying of Turnips, Potatoes, Cabbages, Parsnips, Pease, and Carrots. (Repealed by Statute Law Revision Act 1959 (7 & 8 Eliz. 2. c. 68))
| Preservation of Timber Act 1772 (repealed) | 13 Geo. 3. c. 33 | 7 April 1773 |
An Act to extend the Provisions of an Act, made in the Sixth Year of His present Majesty's Reign, intituled, "An Act for the better Preservation of Timber Trees, and of Woods and Underwoods, and for the further Preservation of Roots, Shrubs, and Plants," (Note: (6 Geo. 3. c. ?)) to Poplar, Alder, Maple, Larch, and Hornbeam. (Repealed by Statute Law Revision Act 1861 (24 & 25 Vict. c. 101))
| Brighton Streets Act 1772 (repealed) | 13 Geo. 3. c. 34 | 7 April 1773 |
An Act for paving, lighting, and cleaning the Streets, Lanes, and Places, within the Town of Brighthelmstone, (Note: Brighthelmstone is now known as Brighton.) in the County of Sussex; for removing Nuisances and Annoyances, and preventing the like for the future; for holding and regulating a Market within the said Town; for building and repairing Groyns, in order to render the Coast safe and commodious for Ships or Vessels to unload and land Sea Coal, Culm, and other Coal, for the Use of the Inhabitants of the said Town, and for laying a Duty thereon: and for other Purposes. (Repealed by Brighthelmston Improvement and Poor Relief Act 1825 (6 Geo. 4. c. clxxix))
| Essex Gaol Act 1772 | 13 Geo. 3. c. 35 | 7 April 1773 |
An Act for raising a further Sum of Money for the Purpose of rebuilding the Common Gaol of the County of Essex.
| Birmingham Improvement Act 1772 (repealed) | 13 Geo. 3. c. 36 | 7 April 1773 |
An Act to amend an Act, passed in the Ninth Year of His present Majesty, intituled, "An Act for laying open and widening certain Ways and Passages within the Town of Birmingham, and for cleaning and lighting the Streets, Lanes, Ways, and Passages there; and for removing and preventing Nuisances and Obstructions therein;" (Note: Birmingham Improvement Act 1769 (9 Geo. 3. c. 83)) and for widening certain other Streets and Places; for establishing a Nightly Watch; and for regulating Carts and Carmen employed in the said Town. (Repealed by Birmingham Improvement Act 1812 (52 Geo. 3. c. cxiii))
| North River, Norfolk Navigation Act 1772 | 13 Geo. 3. c. 37 | 7 April 1773 |
An Act for making and extending the Navigation of the River Bure, (commonly called The North River), by and from Coltishall, to Aylsliam Bridge, in the County of Norfolk.
| Plate Glass Manufacture Act 1772 (repealed) | 13 Geo. 3. c. 38 | 7 April 1773 |
An Act to incorporate Certain Persons, therein named, and their successors, with proper Powers, for the Purpose of establishing One or more Glass Manufactories within the Kingdom of Great Britain, (Note: British Cast Plate Manufacturers Company.) and for the more effectually supporting and conducting the same upon an improved Plan, in a peculiar Manner calculated for the calling of large Plate Glass. (Repealed by Statute Law Revision Act 1953 (2 & 3 Eliz. 2. c. 5))
| Huntingdon Drainage Act 1772 | 13 Geo. 3. c. 39 | 7 April 1773 |
An Act for draining and preserving certain Fen Lands and Low Grounds, called King's Delph and Eight Roods, and also other Fen Lands and Low Grounds in a certain Place called Farcett Fen adjoining thereto, lying near to the Hamlet and Village of Farcett and Standground, in the County of Huntingdon.
| Bedford Level (Drainage) Act 1772 | 13 Geo. 3. c. 40 | 7 April 1773 |
An Act tor amending and rendering more effectual an Act, made in the Twenty-seventh Year of the Reign of His late Majesty King George the Second, intituled, "An Act for discharging the Corporation of the Governor, Bailiffs, and Commonalty of the Company of Conservators of the Great Level of the Fens, commonly called Bedford Level, from a Debt due to the Duke of Bedford and Earl of Lincoln; and for enabling the Proprietors of Lands in the North Level, Part of the said Great Level, to raise Money, to discharge the Proportion of the said North Level in the Debts of the said Corporation and for ascertaining and appropriating the Taxes to be laid on the said North Level; and for the more effectual draining and preserving the said North Level and divers Lands adjoining thereto, in the Manor of Crowland;" (Note: (27 Geo. 2. c. ?)) so far as the same relates to the several Fen Lands lying in the Second District in the said Act described.
| Cox's Museum Act 1772 (repealed) | 13 Geo. 3. c. 41 | 10 May 1773 |
An Act for enabling James Cox, Jeweller, to dispose of his Museum, commonly called Cox's Museum, by Way of Chance, in such Manner as may be most for the Benefit of himself and his Creditors. (Repealed by Statute Law Revision Act 1948 (11 & 12 Geo. 6. c. 62))
| Petersham Streets Act 1772 | 13 Geo. 3. c. 42 | 10 May 1773 |
An Act for amending, lighting, and watching, the Highways or Roads within the Town, Village, or Chapelry, of Petersham, in the County of Surry.
| Corn Act 1772 (repealed) | 13 Geo. 3. c. 43 | 10 May 1773 |
An Act to regulate the Importation and Exportation of Corn. (Repealed by Statute Law Revision Act 1953 (2 & 3 Eliz. 2. c. 5))
| Customs Act 1772 or the Tea Act 1773 (repealed) | 13 Geo. 3. c. 44 | 10 May 1773 |
An Act to allow a Drawback of the Duties of Customs on the Exportation of Tea to any of His Majesty's Colonies or Plantations in America; to increase the Deposit on Bohea Tea to be sold at the India Company's Sales; and to empower the Commissioners of the Treasury to grant Licences to the East India Company to export Tea Duty-free. (Repealed by Statute Law Revision Act 1861 (24 & 25 Vict. c. 101))
| Bedford Level (Drainage) (No. 2) Act 1772 | 13 Geo. 3. c. 45 | 10 May 1773 |
An Act for draining and preserving certain Fen Lands and Low Grounds, lying in the South Level, Part of the Great Level of the Fens commonly called Bedford Level, between certain old Rivers or Drains called Stoke River and Brandon River, and a certain Level or District called Feltwell New District, and the Hardlands of Woodhall in Helgay, and Helgay, in the Counties of Norfolk and Suffolk.
| Yaxley (Drainage) Act 1772 | 13 Geo. 3. c. 46 | 28 May 1773 |
An Act for the more effectual draining and preserving certain Fen Lands and Low Grounds, in the Parish of Yaxley, in the County of Huntingdon.
| Skipton Canal Act 1772 | 13 Geo. 3. c. 47 | 10 May 1773 |
An Act to enable the Right Honourable Sackville Earl of Thanet to make a navigable Cut or Canal from a Place called The Spring, lying near Skipton Castle, in the County of York, to join to and communicate with the navigable Canal from Leeds to Liverpoole, in a Close called Hebble End Close, in the Township of Skipton, in the said County of York.
| Saint Marylebone (Streets) Act 1772 (repealed) | 13 Geo. 3. c. 48 | 28 May 1773 |
An Act for amending and rendering more effectual Two Acts, made, One in the Eighth (Note: Marylebone Improvement Act 1768 (8 Geo. 3. c. 46)) and the other in the Tenth (Note: Saint Marylebone (Improvement) Act 1770 (10 Geo. 3. c. 23)) Year of His present Majesty's Reign, for regulating the Nightly Watch and Beadles; and for paving, repairing, cleansing, and lighting, the Parish of Saint Mary le Bone, in the County of Middlesex; and for other Purposes in the said Acts mentioned. (Repealed by Saint Marylebone Improvement Act 1795 (35 Geo. 3. c. 73))
| Bedford Level (Drainage) (No. 3) Act 1772 | 13 Geo. 3. c. 49 | 28 May 1773 |
An Act for more effectually executing an Act, passed in the Twenty-seventh Year of King George the Second, (Note: (27 Geo. 2. c. ?)) for draining and preserving the Lands in the North Level, Part of Bedford Level; so far as relates to the Fourth District of the said North Level.
| Southampton Poor Relief Act 1772 (repealed) | 13 Geo. 3. c. 50 | 28 May 1773 |
An Act for better regulating the Poor, and repairing the Highways, within the Town and County of the Town of Southampton. (Repealed by Local Government Board's Provisional Order Confirmation (Poor Law) Act 1909 (9 Edw. 7. c. cxvi))
| Frivolous Suits Act 1772 (repealed) | 13 Geo. 3. c. 51 | 28 May 1773 |
An Act to discourage the Practice of commencing frivolous and vexatious Suits in His Majesty's Courts at Westminster, in Causes of Action arising within the Dominion of Wales; and for further regulating the Proceedings in the Courts of Great Sessions in Wales. (Repealed by Statute Law Revision Act 1861 (24 & 25 Vict. c. 101))
| Plate Assay (Sheffield and Birmingham) Act 1772 or the Sheffield Assay Office Act 1773 | 13 Geo. 3. c. 52 | 28 May 1773 |
An Act for appointing Wardens and Assay-Masters for assaying Wrought Plate, in the Towns of Sheffield and Birmingham.
| Bethnal Green (Poor Relief) Act 1772 (repealed) | 13 Geo. 3. c. 53 | 28 May 1773 |
An Act to enable the Inhabitants of the Parish of Saint Matthew Bethnal Green, in the County of Middlesex, to pay Debts already contracted in finishing and furnishing their Workhouse, and on Account of the Poor of the said Parish, and for their further Relief. (Repealed by London Government (Borough of Bethnal Green) Order in Council 1901 (SR&O 1901/212))
| Game (Scotland) Act 1772 (repealed) | 13 Geo. 3. c. 54 | 21 June 1773 |
An Act for the more effectual Preservation of the Game in that Part of Great Britain called Scotland; and for repealing and amending several of the Laws now in being relative thereto. (Repealed by Wildlife and Natural Environment (Scotland) Act 2011 (asp 6))
| Game (England) Act 1772 (repealed) | 13 Geo. 3. c. 55 | 21 June 1773 |
An Act to explain and amend the several Laws now in being, so far as the same relate to the Preservation of the Moor or Hill Game. (Repealed by Game Act 1831 (1 & 2 Will. 4. c. 32))
| Sale of Spirits, etc. Act 1772 (repealed) | 13 Geo. 3. c. 56 | 21 June 1773 |
An Act for the mote effectually restraining the retailing of Distilled Spirituous Liquors; and for preventing the forging or counterfeiting any Stamp or Seal used for marking Silks, Callicoes, Linens, and Stuffs, to be printed, painted, stained, or dyed, in Great Britain. (Repealed by Statute Law Revision Act 1871 (34 & 35 Vict. c. 116))
| Paper Currency in America Act 1772 or the Currency Act 1773 (repealed) | 13 Geo. 3. c. 57 | 21 June 1773 |
An Act to explain and amend an Act, made in the Fourth Year of His present Majesty, intituled, "An Act to prevent Paper Bills of Credit hereafter to be issued in any of His Majesty Colonies or Plantations in America, from being declared to be a legal Tender in Payments of Money;" (Note: (4 Geo. 3. c. ?)) and to prevent the legal Tender of such Bills as are now subsisting from being prolonged beyond the Periods limited for calling in and sinking the same. (Repealed by Coinage Act 1870 (33 & 34 Vict. c. 10))
| Gaols Act 1772 (repealed) | 13 Geo. 3. c. 58 | 21 June 1773 |
An Act for providing Clergymen to officiate in Gaols within that Part of Great Britain called England. (Repealed by Statute Law Revision Act 1861 (24 & 25 Vict. c. 101))
| Plate (Offences) Act 1772 (repealed) | 13 Geo. 3. c. 59 | 21 June 1773 |
An Act for repealing so much of an Act of the Thirty-first Year of His late Majesty, (Note: (31 Geo. 2. c. ?)) as inflict Capital Punishment for Frauds and Abuses in the marking or stamping of Gold or Silver Plate; and for inflicting another Punishment for the said Offence. (Repealed by Hallmarking Act 1973 (c. 43))
| Isle of Ely, etc. (Drainage) (No. 3) Act 1772 | 13 Geo. 3. c. 60 | 21 June 1773 |
An Act for draining and preserving certain Lands and Grounds in the Parishes of Tid Saint Giles and Newton, in the Isle of Ely, in the County of Cambridge, and in Tid Saint Mary's, in the County of Lincoln.
| Kingston-upon-Thames (Streets) Act 1772 (repealed) | 13 Geo. 3. c. 61 | 21 June 1773 |
An Act for the better lighting and watching, the Town of Kingston upon Thames, in the County of Surrey, and for removing and preventing all Obstructions, Encroachments, and Nuisances therein. (Repealed by Kingston-upon-Thames Improvement Act 1855 (18 & 19 Vict. c. xlv))
| Bread Act 1772 (repealed) | 13 Geo. 3. c. 62 | 21 June 1773 |
An Act for better regulating the Assize and making of Bread. (Repealed by Statute Law Revision Act 1861 (24 & 25 Vict. c. 101))
| East India Company Act 1772 or the Regulating Act 1773 or the India Act 1773 (repealed) | 13 Geo. 3. c. 63 | 21 June 1773 |
An Act for establishing certain Regulations for the better Management of the Affairs of the East India Company, as well in India as in Europe. (Repealed by Government of India (Amendment) Act 1916 (6 & 7 Geo. 5. c. 37))
| East India Company (No. 4) Act 1772 (repealed) | 13 Geo. 3. c. 64 | 1 July 1773 |
An Act for granting to His Majesty a Sum of Money to be raised by Exchequer Bills, and to be advanced and applied in the Manner, and upon the Terms therein mentioned, for the Relief of the United Company of Merchants of England trading to the East Indies. (Repealed by Statute Law Revision Act 1871 (34 & 35 Vict. c. 116))
| Newspaper Duty Act 1772 (repealed) | 13 Geo. 3. c. 65 | 1 July 1773 |
An Act for explaining Two Acts, made in the Eleventh Year of the Reign of King George the First, (Note: Taxation Act 1724 (11 Geo. 1. c. 4)) and the Thirtieth Year of the Reign of His late Majesty, (Note: Taxation Act 1739 (13 Geo. 2. c. 1)) in relation to the Stamp Duties upon Newspapers. (Repealed by Statute Law Revision Act 1871 (34 & 35 Vict. c. 116))
| Unfunded Debt Act 1772 (repealed) | 13 Geo. 3. c. 66 | 1 July 1773 |
An Act for raising a certain Sum of Money by Loans or Exchequer Bills, for the Service of the Year One thousand, seven hundred and seventy-three. (Repealed by Statute Law Revision Act 1871 (34 & 35 Vict. c. 116))
| Importation (No. 4) Act 1772 (repealed) | 13 Geo. 3. c. 67 | 1 July 1773 |
An Act for laying an additional Duty on Paper printed, painted, or stained, in Foreign Parts, imported into this Kingdom. (Repealed by Statute Law Revision Act 1861 (24 & 25 Vict. c. 101))
| Silk Manufactures Act 1772 (repealed) | 13 Geo. 3. c. 68 | 1 July 1773 |
An Act to empower the Magistrates therein mentioned to settle and regulate the Wages of Persons employed in the Silk Manufacture, within their respective Jurisdictions. (Repealed by Silk Manufactures Act 1824 (5 Geo. 4. c. 66))
| Importation and Exportation (No. 6) Act 1772 (repealed) | 13 Geo. 3. c. 69 | 1 July 1773 |
An Act for further continuing an Act, made in the Fourth Year of the Reign of his present Majesty, (Note: (4 Geo. 3. c. ?)) for importing Salt from Europe, into the Province of Quebec in America, for a limited Time. (Repealed by Statute Law Revision Act 1871 (34 & 35 Vict. c. 116))
| Importation and Exportation (No. 7) Act 1772 (repealed) | 13 Geo. 3. c. 70 | 1 July 1773 |
An Act to continue an Act, made in the Thirty-first Year of the Reign of His late Majesty King George the Second, intituled, "An Act for the Encouragement of the Exportation of Culm to Lisbon, in the Kingdom of Portugal;" (Note: (31 Geo. 2. c. ?)) and for chargeing a higher Duty upon Culm exported thither in Foreign Shipping. (Repealed by Statute Law Revision Act 1871 (34 & 35 Vict. c. 116))
| Counterfeiting, etc., of Gold Coin Act 1772 (repealed) | 13 Geo. 3. c. 71 | 1 July 1773 |
An Act for the better preventing the counterfeiting, clipping, and other diminishing, the Gold Coin of this Kingdom. (Repealed by Coinage Offences Act 1832 (2 & 3 Will. 4. c. 34))
| Importation and Exportation (No. 8) Act 1772 (repealed) | 13 Geo. 3. c. 72 | 1 July 1773 |
An Act to permit the free Importation of Cod Fish, Ling, and Hake, caught and cured in Chaleur Bay, or any other Part of the Gulph of Saint Lawrence, or on the Coast of Labrador. (Repealed by Statute Law Revision Act 1861 (24 & 25 Vict. c. 101))
| Importation and Exportation (No. 9) Act 1772 (repealed) | 13 Geo. 3. c. 73 | 1 July 1773 |
An Act to continue and amend an Act, made in the Sixth Year of the Reign of His present Majesty, intituled, "An Act for opening and establishing certain Ports in the Islands of Jamaica and Dominica, for the more free Importation and Exportation of certain Goods and Merchandizes; for granting certain Duties to, defray the Expences of opening, maintaining, securing, and improving, such Ports; for ascertaining the Duties to be paid upon the Importation of Goods from the said Island of Dominica into this Kingdom; and for securing the Duties upon Goods imported from the said Island, into any other British Colony;" (Note: (6 Geo. 3. c. ?)) and for allowing Timber and Wood to be exported from the said Island of Dominica, into any other of the British Islands, Colonies, or Plantations, in America, for a limited Time. (Repealed by Statute Law Revision Act 1861 (24 & 25 Vict. c. 101))
| Tonnage, etc., of Ships, etc. Act 1772 (repealed) | 13 Geo. 3. c. 74 | 1 July 1773 |
An Act for the better ascertaining the Tonnage and Burthen of Ships and Vessels importing and exporting Goods into and from this Kingdom, or hovering upon the Coasts thereof; for amending so much of an Act, made in the last Session of Parliament, (Note: (12 Geo. 3. c. ?)) for lowering the Duty payable upon the Importation of Oak Bark, as relates to the suing for the Penalties and Forfeitures thereby inflicted in the Court of Exchequer in Scotland; for appropriating the Duty on Oak Bark granted by the said Act; and for obviating Doubts which have arisen with respect to the allowing the Drawback upon certain Callicoes, and the Bounty upon British made Cordage exported to the Islands of Madeira, the Canary Islands, and the Azores or Western Islands. (Repealed by Statute Law Revision Act 1861 (24 & 25 Vict. c. 101))
| Adam Buildings Act 1772 (repealed) | 13 Geo. 3. c. 75 | 1 July 1773 |
An Act for enabling John, Robert, James, and William Adam, to dispose of several Houses and Buildings, in the Parish of Saint Martin in the Fields, and Saint Mary le Bone, in the County of Middlesex, and other their Effects, by Way of Chance, in such Manner as may be most for the Benefit of themselves and Creditors. (Repealed by Statute Law Revision Act 1948 (11 & 12 Geo. 6. c. 62))
| Indemnity (No. 3) Act 1772 (repealed) | 13 Geo. 3. c. 76 | 1 July 1773 |
An Act to indemnify Justices of the Peace, Deputy Lieutenants, and Officers of the Militia, or others, who have omitted to register or deliver in their Qualifications, within the Time limited by Law; and for giving further Time for those Purposes. (Repealed by Statute Law Revision Act 1871 (34 & 35 Vict. c. 116))
| Supply, etc. (No. 2) Act 1772 (repealed) | 13 Geo. 3. c. 77 | 1 July 1773 |
An Act for granting to His Majesty a certain Sum of Money out of the Sinking Fund; and for applying certain Monies therein mentioned, for the Service of the Year One thousand seven hundred and seventy-three; and for further appropriating the Supplies granted in this Session of Parliament; and for paying to John Harrison a further Reward for his Invention of a Time-keeper for ascertaining the Longitude at Sea, and his Discovery of the Principles upon which the same was constructed. (Repealed by Statute Law Revision Act 1871 (34 & 35 Vict. c. 116))

=== Private acts ===
| Short title | Citation | Royal assent |
Long title
| Naturalization of Paul D'Aigremont Act 1772 | 13 Geo. 3. c. 1 Pr. | 21 December 1772 |
An Act for naturalizing Paul D' Agremont.
| Naturalization of Vidal, Rivier, and Favenc Act 1772 | 13 Geo. 3. c. 2 Pr. | 21 December 1772 |
An Act for naturalizing Emeric Vidal, Philippe Rivier, and Abraham Favenc.
| Naturalization of Peter Francis Martin Act 1772 | 13 Geo. 3. c. 3 Pr. | 21 December 1772 |
An Act for naturalizing Petir Francis Martin.

=== Sources ===
- Pickering, Danby, ed. (1773). "Anno decimo tertio Georgii III". The Statutes at Large. Vol. 30: To the End of the Thirteenth Parliament of Great Britain. Cambridge: Charles Bathurst. pp. 1–322 – via Internet Archive.
- Pickering, Danby, ed. (1773). "Anno decimo tertio Georgii III". The Statutes at Large. Vol. 30: To the End of the Thirteenth Parliament of Great Britain. Cambridge: Charles Bathurst. pp. 1–322 – via Internet Archive.
- Journals of the House of Commons. Vol. 34. London: His Majesty's Stationery Office. 1804. pp. 3–390 – via Google Books.
- Chronological Table of and Index to the Statutes. Vol. 1: To the End of the Session 59 Vict. Sess. 2 (1895) (13th ed.). London: Her Majesty's Stationery Office. 1896. pp. 129–130 – via Google Books.
- "Acts of the Parliament of Great Britain from 1772". legislation.gov.uk. The National Archives.

== 1773 ==
=== Public acts ===
| Short title | Citation | Royal assent |
Long title
| Highways Act 1773 (repealed) | 13 Geo. 3. c. 78 | 1 July 1773 |
An Act to explain, amend, and reduce into One Act of Parliament, the Statutes now in being for the Amendment and Preservation of the Publick Highways within that Part of Great Britain called England; and for other Purposes. (Repealed by Highways Act 1959 (7 & 8 Eliz. 2. c. 25))
| Bank of England Notes Act 1773 (repealed) | 13 Geo. 3. c. 79 | 1 July 1773 |
An Act for the more effectual preventing the forging of the Notes or Bills of the Governor and Company of the Bank of England; and for the preventing the obtaining a false Credit by the Imitation of the Notes or Bills of the said Governor and Company. (Repealed by Statute Law Revision Act 1871 (34 & 35 Vict. c. 116))
| Game Act 1773 (repealed) | 13 Geo. 3. c. 80 | 1 July 1773 |
An Act to repeal an Act, made in the Tenth Year of the Reign of His present Majesty, intituled, "An Act for the better Preservation of the Game within that Part of Great Britain, called England;" (Note: (10 Geo. 3. c. ?)) and for making other Provisions in Lieu thereof. (Repealed by Statute Law Revision Act 1861 (24 & 25 Vict. c. 101))
| Inclosure Act 1773 | 13 Geo. 3. c. 81 | 1 July 1773 |
An Act for the better Cultivation, Improvement, and Regulation, of the Common Arable Fields, Wastes, and Commons of Pasture, in this Kingdom.
| Lying-in Hospitals Act 1773 (repealed) | 13 Geo. 3. c. 82 | 1 July 1773 |
An Act for the better Regulation of Lying in Hospitals, and other Places appropriated for the charitable Reception of pregnant Women; and also to provide for the Settlement of Bastard Children born in such Hospitals and Places. (Repealed by Statute Law Revision Act 1948 (11 & 12 Geo. 6. c. 62))
| Richmond Bridge Act 1773 | 13 Geo. 3. c. 83 | 1 July 1773 |
An Act for building a Bridge across the River of Thames, from Richmond, in the County of Surrey, to the opposite Shore, in the County of Middlesex; and to enable His Majesty to grant the Inheritance of the Ferry at Richmond to certain Persons therein mentioned.
| Turnpike Roads Act 1773 or the General Turnpike Act 1773 (repealed) | 13 Geo. 3. c. 84 | 1 July 1773 |
An Act to explain, amend, and reduce into One Act of Parliament, the General Laws now in being for regulating the Turnpike Roads in that Part of Great Britain called England; and for other Purposes. (Repealed by Turnpike Roads Act 1822 (3 Geo. 4. c. 126))
| Land at Snaith, Yorkshire Act 1773 or the Goodall (Yorkshire) Inclosure Act 1773 | 13 Geo. 3. c. 85 | 1 July 1773 |
An Act for dividing and enclosing the Open Arable Fields, Meadows, Pastures, and Commons or Waste Grounds, in the Township of Gowdall, in the Parish of Snaith, in the County of York; and for draining and preserving the same.
| Trent Navigation Act 1773 | 13 Geo. 3. c. 86 | 24 December 1772 |
An Act for improving and completing the Navigation of that Branch of the River Trent which runs by the Town of Newark upon Trent, from a Place called The Upper Wear, in the Parish of Averham, in the County of Nottingham, to a Place called The Crankleys, in the Parish of South Muskham, in the said County.
| Kettering to Newport Pagnell Road Act 1773 | 13 Geo. 3. c. 87 | 16 March 1773 |
An Act for enlarging the Term and Powers of an Act, made in the Twenty-seventh Year of the Reign of His late Majesty, (Note: (27 Geo. 2. c. ?)) for repairing the Road from the Toll-Gate in the Parish of Kettering, in the County of Northampton, to Newport Pagnell, in the County of Bucks.
| Bagshot to Winchester Road Act 1773 | 13 Geo. 3. c. 88 | 16 March 1773 |
An Act to continue the Term, and alter the Powers of an Act, made in the Twenty-sixth Year of the Reign of His late Majesty King George the Second, (Note: Surrey and Southampton Roads Act 1753 (26 Geo. 2. c. 51)) for repairing and widening the Roads leading from a Place called Basingstone, (Note: The Basing Stone was located near the former Jolly Farmer public house, at the junction of the A30 and A325 roads.) near the Town of Bagshot, in the Parish of Windlesham, in the County of Surrey, through Frimley and Farnham, in the same County; and from thence through Bentley, Hollyborn, Alton, Chawton, Ropley, Bishops-Sutton, New Alresford, and Mattingley, otherwise Matterley Lane, to the City of Winchester, in the County of Southampton.
| Sussex Roads Act 1773 | 13 Geo. 3. c. 89 | 16 March 1773 |
An Act to enlarge the Powers of Two Acts, made in the Twenty-fifth Year of King George the Second, (Note: (25 Geo. 2. c. ?)) and Sixth Year of King George the Third, (Note: (6 Geo. 3. c. ?)) for repairing the Roads, from the North End of Malling Street, near the Town of Lewes, and other Roads in the County of Sussex; and for amending the Road from the Broil Park Gate, to the West End of the Turnpike Road, leading from the Turnpike Road on Hurst Green, through the Parishes of Etchingham and Burwash; and from the said Broil Park Gate to the Town of Battell, in the said County, so far as relates to the Road from the Broil Park Gate to the West End of the Turnpike Road leading from the Turnpike Road on Hurst Green, through the Parishes of Etchingham and Burwash aforesaid.
| Nottinghamshire Roads Act 1773 | 13 Geo. 3. c. 90 | 16 March 1773 |
An Act for repairing and widening the Road from Newark upon Trent, in the County of Nottingham, to join the Turnpike Road from Nottingham to Grantham, in the County of Lincoln, near the Guide Post on the Foss Road, near Bingham, in the said County of Nottingham.
| Northants Roads Act 1773 | 13 Geo. 3. c. 91 | 1 April 1773 |
An Act for enlarging the Term and Powers of an Act of Parliament of the Twenty-seventh Year of the Reign of His late Majesty King George the Second, (Note: (27 Geo. 2. c. ?)) for repairing and widening the Road from the City of Peterborough, through Oundle and Thrapston, to Wellingborough, in the County of Northampton; and for repairing and widening several other Roads near or adjoining thereto.
| Farnborough to Seven Oaks Road Act 1773 | 13 Geo. 3. c. 92 | 1 April 1773 |
An Act for continuing the Term and enlarging the Powers of an Act, made in the Twenty-second Year of His late Majesty's Reign, (Note: Kent Roads Act 1748 (22 Geo. 2. c. 4)) for repairing and widening the Road leading from the Well at the North-west End of the Town or Village of Farnborough, in the County of Kent, to a Place called River Hill, in the Parish of Seven Oaks, in the said County.
| St. Columb Canal Act 1773 | 13 Geo. 3. c. 93 | 1 April 1773 |
An Act for making and continuing a navigable Cut or Canal from Maugan Porth, through the several Parishes of Maugan, Saint Colomb Major, Little Colan, and Saint Colomb Minor, to Lower Saint Colomb Porth, in the County of Cornwall.
| Southampton Roads Act 1773 | 13 Geo. 3. c. 94 | 1 April 1773 |
An Act for enlarging the Terms and Powers of Two Acts of the Tenth (Note: (10 Geo. 2. c. ?)) and Twenty-first (Note: (21 Geo. 2. c. ?)) Years of the Reign of His late Majesty King George the Second, for repairing the Road from Hertford Bridge Hill, to the Town of Basing Stoke, and also the Road from Hertford Bridge Hill aforesaid, to the Town of Odiham, in the County of Southampton.
| Hereford Roads Act 1773 | 13 Geo. 3. c. 95 | 1 April 1773 |
An Act for enlarging the Term and Powers granted by an Act, passed in the Twenty-ninth Year of the Reign of His late Majesty, (Note: Hereford Roads Act 1756 (29 Geo. 2. c. 65)) for repairing and widening the Roads leading from the Town of Kington, in the County of Hereford, through the Welch Hall Lane, as far as the same County extends; and the several Roads leading from Kington aforesaid to Brilley's Mountain, to Eardisley, to Almley, to Eckley's Green, to Eardisland, to Staple Bar, and to Milton House, in the said County; and for amending the Road from the Turnpike Road in the Parish of Eardisley to Willersley Turnpike Gate in the said Parish.
| Hereford Roads (No. 2) Act 1773 | 13 Geo. 3. c. 96 | 7 April 1773 |
An Act for enlarging the Term and varying the Powers granted by an Act, passed in the Twenty-second Year of the Reign of His late Majesty, (Note: (22 Geo. 2. c. ?)) for repairing and widening the several Roads leading into the Town of Ross, in the County of Hereford.
| Warwick and Gloucester Roads Act 1773 | 13 Geo. 3. c. 97 | 1 April 1773 |
An Act for enlarging the Terms and Powers of Three Acts, passed in the Third, (Note: Warwick Roads Act 1729 (3 Geo. 2. c. 9)) Seventeenth, (Note: Warwick Roads Act 1743 (17 Geo. 2. c. 12)) and Thirtieth (Note: Somerset and Wiltshire Roads Act 1757 (30 Geo. 2. c. 40)) Years of the Reign of His late Majesty King George the Second, for repairing the Road leading from a Gate called Shipston Toll-Gate at Bridgetown, in the Parish of Old Stratford, in the County of Warwick, through Alderminster and Shipston upon Stower, to the Top of Long Compton Hill, in the said County of Warwick; and also for repairing the Road leading from the First Mile Scone Handing on the said Shipston Road, through a Lane called Clifford Lane, and through Mickleton and Chipping Campden, to a Place called Andover’s Ford, in the County of Gloucester, as far as the same relate to the said first-mentioned Road.
| Kent Roads Act 1773 | 13 Geo. 3. c. 98 | 7 April 1773 |
An Act for repairing the Road from the Royal Oak on Wrotham Heath, to the Town of Wrotham, in the County of Kent, and from thence to Foot's Cray; and from the said Royal Oak to the Town of Maidstone in the said County.
| Durham Roads Act 1773 | 13 Geo. 3. c. 99 | 7 April 1773 |
An Act for enlarging the Terms and Powers of Two Acts, of the Twentieth (Note: (20 Geo. 2. c. ?)) and Twenty-sixth (Note: (26 Geo. 2. c. ?)) Years of the Reign of His late Majesty, for repairing the High Road leading from the City of Durham, in the County of Durham, to Tyne Bridge, in the said County.
| Staffordshire Roads Act 1773 | 13 Geo. 3. c. 100 | 7 April 1773 |
An Act to enlarge the Term and Powers of an Act, made in the Fifth Year of His present Majesty, (Note: Stafford Roads Act 1765 (5 Geo. 3. c. 84)) for repairing and widening the Road from Newcastle under Line to Hassop, and from Middle Hills to the Macclesfield Turnpike Road near Buxton; and also the Road branching out of the first-mentioned Road at Cobridge to Burslem, and to the Uttoxeter Turnpike Road at Shelton, in the County of Stafford;” and for amending several other Roads adjoining thereto.
| Wilts Roads Act 1773 | 13 Geo. 3. c. 101 | 7 April 1773 |
An Act for continuing the Term, and enlarging the Powers of an Act, made in the Seventeenth Year of the Reign of His late Majesty King George the Second, (Note: (17 Geo. 2. c. ?)) for repairing the Road from Cherill, through Calne, to Studley Bridge, and from Cherill to the Three Mile Borrough at the Top of Cherill Hill, in the County of Wilts.
| Northants Roads (No. 2) Act 1773 | 13 Geo. 3. c. 102 | 7 April 1773 |
An Act for continuing Term and enlarging the Powers of an Act, passed in the Eighth Year of His present Majesty's Reign, (Note: (8 Geo. 3. c. ?)) for repairing and widening the Road from the Way Post in the Parish of Hardingston, in the County of Northampton, to Old Stratford, in the said County.
| Merioneth Roads Act 1773 | 13 Geo. 3. c. 103 | 10 May 1773 |
An Act for continuing and enlarging the Terms and Powers of Two Acts, made in the Thirty-first Year of His late Majesty, (Note: (31 Geo. 2. c. ?)) and Ninth Year of His present Majesty's Reign, (Note: (9 Geo. 3. c. ?)) for repairing several Roads in the Counties of Montgomery, Merioneth, and Salop; and for repairing several other Roads therein mentioned.
| Forth and Clyde Navigation Act 1773 | 13 Geo. 3. c. 104 | 10 May 1773 |
An Act to enlarge the Powers of Two Acts, made in the Eighth (Note: Forth and Clyde Navigation Act 1768 (8 Geo. 3. c. 63)) and Eleventh (Note: Forth and Clyde Navigation Act 1771 (11 Geo. 3. c. 62)) Years of the Reign of His present Majesty, for making and maintaining a navigable Cut or Canal, from the Firth or River of Forth, at or near the Mouth of the River of Carron, in the County of Stirling, to the Firth or River of Clyde, at or near a Place called Dalmuir Burnfoot, in the County of Dumbarton; and also a collateral Cut from the same to the City of Glasgow; and for making a navigable Cut or Canal of Communication from the Port and Harbour, of Burrowstounness, to join the said Canal at or near the Place where it will sell into the Firth of Forth.
| Hampton to Staines Road Act 1773 | 13 Geo. 3. c. 105 | 10 May 1773 |
An Act for, amending, widening, and keeping in Repair, the Road from the Guide Post at the West End of the Town of Hampton, over Sunbury Common, to the Town of Staines, in the County of Middlesex.
| Worcester and Warwick Roads Act 1773 | 13 Geo. 3. c. 106 | 10 May 1773 |
An Act for enlarging and altering the Terms and Powers of Two several Acts, made in the Thirteenth Year of the Reign of King George the First, (Note: (13 Geo. 1. c. ?)) and in the Fifteenth Year of the Reign of King George the Second, (Note: Bromsgrove and Birmingham Roads Act 1726 (15 Geo. 2. c. 15)) for repairing the Roads leading from the Town of Bromsgrove to the Town of Dudley, in the County of Worcester; and from the said Town of Bromsgrove to the Town of Birmingham, in the County of Warwick; so far as the said Acts relate to the repairing of the said Road leading from the Town of Bromsgrove to the Town of Dudley.
| Worcester and Warwick Roads (No. 2) Act 1773 | 13 Geo. 3. c. 107 | 10 May 1773 |
An Act for enlarging and altering the Term and Powers of an Act, made in the Twenty-sixth Year of the Reign of King George the Second, (Note: (26 Geo. 2. c. ?)) for repairing the Roads leading from the Market House in Stourbridge, and other Roads therein mentioned, in the Counties of Worcester, Stafford, Salop, and Warwick, respectively.
| Rutland Roads Act 1773 | 13 Geo. 3. c. 108 | 10 May 1773 |
An Act for repairing and widening the Road from the North Turnpike Road near Scot Gate, otherwise Scot Gate, in the Town of Stamford, in the County of Lincoln, to Oakham, in the County of Rutland; and from Oakham, through Burley, to a Gate on the North Side of a certain Close in the said Lordship of Burley called Booth’s Close, adjoining to the Open Fields of Cottesmore, in the said County of Rutland.
| Exeter Roads, etc. Act 1773 | 13 Geo. 3. c. 109 | 10 May 1773 |
An Act for more effectually amending several Roads leading from the City of Exeter; and for rebuilding or repairing Exe Bridge, and making the Avenues leading thereto more commodious; and for building a Bridge over the River Exe, at or near Countess Wear; and for amending several other Roads therein mentioned.
| Cambridge Roads Act 1773 | 13 Geo. 3. c. 110 | 28 May 1773 |
An Act to enlarge the Term and Powers of an Act, passed in the Sixth Year of His present Majesty's Reign, intituled, "An Act for repairing and widening the Road from the present Turnpike Road at Haverhill, to Redcross, in the Parish of Shelford, in the County of Cambridge." (Note: (6 Geo. 3. c. ?))
| Llandovery Bridge Act 1773 | 13 Geo. 3. c. 111 | 28 May 1773 |
An Act for building a Bridge over the River Towey, near Llandovery, in the County of Carmarthen; and for making the Fords near the said Town safe and commodious.
| Truro Roads Act 1773 | 13 Geo. 3. c. 112 | 28 May 1773 |
An Act for more effectually amending several Roads leading from and near the Borough of Truro, in the County of Cornwall; and for building a Bridge over the River, at a Place called The Steppings, in or near the said Borough.
| Redstone Bridge, Severn Act 1773 | 13 Geo. 3. c. 113 | 28 May 1773 |
An Act for building a Bridge across the River Severn, near Redstone, in the County of Worcester; and for making proper Avenues and Roads to and from the same; and for making Satisfaction to the Proprietors of a Ferry across the said River at Redstone aforesaid.
| Kent Roads (No. 2) Act 1773 | 13 Geo. 3. c. 114 | 28 May 1773 |
An Act for enlarging the Term and Powers of Three Acts, passed in the First, (Note: Rochester to Maidstone Road Act 1727 (1 Geo. 2. St. 2. c. 12)) Ninth, (Note: Kent Roads Act 1735 (9 Geo. 2. c. 7)) and Twenty-second (Note: Kent Roads (No. 2) Act 1748 (22 Geo. 2. c. 8)) Years of the Reign of His late Majesty King George the Second, for repairing and enlarging the Road leading from the House called The Sign of the Bells, in the Parish of Saint Margaret in Rochester, to Maidstone, and other Roads therein mentioned, in the County of Kent.

=== Private acts ===
| Short title | Citation | Royal assent |
Long title
| Enabling Robert Viscount Clare, Wellbore Ellis, and Charles Jenkinson to take, in Great Britain, the oaths of office of Vice Treasurer, Receiver General and Paymaster General of Ireland, and to qualify themselves for the enjoyment of the said offices. | 13 Geo. 3. c. 4 Pr. | 16 March 1773 |
An Act to enable the Right Honourable Robert Lord Viscount Clare, the Right Honourable Welbore Ellis, and Charles Jenkinson Esquire, to take, in Great Britain, the Oath of Office as Vice Treasurer, and Receiver General, and Paymaster General, of all His Majesty's Revenues in the Kingdom of Ireland, and to qualify themselves for the Enjoyment of the said Offices.
| Cocks' Estate Act 1773 | 13 Geo. 3. c. 5 Pr. | 16 March 1773 |
An Act for vesting several Fee-Farm and other Rents, Part of the Settled Estates of Sir Charles Cocks Baronet, in Trustees, to be sold; and for enfranchising certain Copyhold or Customary Lands, within the Manor of Reigate, in the County of Surrey; and for laying out the Money arising by such Sale and Enfranchisement in the Purchase of other Lands, to be settled to the same Uses.
| St. Martin's, Birmingham Act 1773 | 13 Geo. 3. c. 6 Pr. | 16 March 1773 |
An Act to enable the Rector of Saint Martin, in Birmingham, to grant Leases of certain Parts of the Glebe Lands belonging to the said Rectory.
| Tardebigg Inclosure Act 1773 | 13 Geo. 3. c. 7 Pr. | 16 March 1773 |
An Act for obviating Doubts touching the Validity of the Proceedings of the Commissioners appointed by an Act, passed in the Eleventh Year of the Reign of His present Majesty, (Note: Tardebigg Inclosure Act 1771 (11 Geo. 3. c. 56 Pr.)) for dividing and enclosing certain Lands therein mentioned, in that Part of the Manor of Tardebigg which lies in the County of Worcester.
| Hadsor Common Inclosure Act 1773 | 13 Geo. 3. c. 8 Pr. | 16 March 1773 |
An Act for dividing and enclosing certain Waste Lands called Hadsor Common, in the County of Worcester.
| Snaith and Cowick (Yorkshire) Inclosure Act 1773 | 13 Geo. 3. c. 9 Pr. | 16 March 1773 |
An Act for dividing and enclosing the Open and Common Fields and Meadow Grounds, in the Townships of Snaith and Cowick, in the County York.
| Armthorpe Inclosure Act 1773 | 13 Geo. 3. c. 10 Pr. | 16 March 1773 |
An Act for dividing and enclosing the several Open Fields, Open Arable Lands, Commons, and Waste Grounds, within the Manor and Parish of Armthorpe, in the West Riding of the County of York.
| Cromwell Inclosure Act 1773 | 13 Geo. 3. c. 11 Pr. | 16 March 1773 |
An Act for dividing and enclosing the Open Fields, Meadows, Common Pastures, and Waste Grounds, within the Parish of Cromwell, in the County of Nottingham.
| Brinkhill Inclosure Act 1773 | 13 Geo. 3. c. 12 Pr. | 16 March 1773 |
An Act for dividing and enclosing the Open Common Fields, Meadows, Pasture, and other Commonable and Waste Lands, within the Manor and Parish of Brinkhill, in the County of Lincoln.
| Gailes Moor in Kirby Ravensworth Inclosure Act 1773 | 13 Geo. 3. c. 13 Pr. | 16 March 1773 |
An Act for dividing and enclosing a certain Moor or Common called Gailes Moor, in the Township and Manor of Dalton Traverse, otherwise Gatles, in the Parish of Kirby Ravensworth, in the North Riding of the County of York.
| Bonsall Leys and Green (Derbyshire) Inclosure Act 1773 | 13 Geo. 3. c. 14 Pr. | 16 March 1773 |
An Act for dividing and enclosing a certain Open Field or Parcel of Land called Bonsall Leys and Green, within the Parish of Bonsall, in the County of Derby.
| Irchester, Wellingborough and Great Doddington (Northamptonshire) Inclosures Act 1773 | 13 Geo. 3. c. 15 Pr. | 16 March 1773 |
An Act for dividing and enclosing the Open and Common Fields, Common Meadows, Common Pastures, and other Commonable Lands and Grounds, in the Parish of Ilchester, in the County of Northampton; and also Two Pieces of Land or Ground therein described, lying within the Parishes of Wellingborough and Great Doddington, in the said County.
| Church Broughton Inclosure Act 1773 | 13 Geo. 3. c. 16 Pr. | 16 March 1773 |
An Act for dividing and enclosing the several Open Fields, Arable Lands, Meadows, Commons, and Waste Grounds, within the Manor of Church Broughton, in the County of Derby.
| Arkendale Inclosure Act 1773 | 13 Geo. 3. c. 17 Pr. | 16 March 1773 |
An Act for dividing and enclosing the Open Fields, Stinted Pasture, Common, and wastes, within the Manor of Arkendale, in the West Riding of the County of York.
| Market Weighton with Shipton Inclosure Act 1773 | 13 Geo. 3. c. 18 Pr. | 16 March 1773 |
An Act for dividing and enclosing several Open Fields and Commons, or Waste Lands, in the Manor of Market Weighton with Shipton, in the County of York.
| Upton in Burford Inclosure Act 1773 | 13 Geo. 3. c. 19 Pr. | 16 March 1773 |
An Act for dividing and enclosing the Open and Common Fields of Upton, in the Parish of Burford, in the County of Oxford.
| Bourton-on-the-Water and Clapton-on-the-Hill (Gloucestershire) Inclosure Act 1773 | 13 Geo. 3. c. 20 Pr. | 16 March 1773 |
An Act for dividing, allotting, and enclosing the Open Common Fields, Common Meadows, Common Pastures, and Waste Grounds, in the Manor and Parish of Bourton on the Water, in the County of Gloucester, and in the Manor of Clapton on the Hill, in the same Parish.
| Churchill Common Inclosure Act 1773 | 13 Geo. 3. c. 21 Pr. | 16 March 1773 |
An Act for dividing and enclosing Churchill Common, within the Manor and Parish of Churchill, in the County of Worcester.
| Morier's Naturalization Act 1773 | 13 Geo. 3. c. 22 Pr. | 16 March 1773 |
An Act for naturalizing Isaac Morier.
| Neuman's Naturalization Act 1773 | 13 Geo. 3. c. 23 Pr. | 16 March 1773 |
An Act for naturalizing John Gottlob Neuman.
| Curchod's Naturalization Act 1773 | 13 Geo. 3. c. 24 Pr. | 16 March 1773 |
An Act for naturalizing John Francis Curchod.
| Bouillon's Naturalization Act 1773 | 13 Geo. 3. c. 25 Pr. | 16 March 1773 |
An Act for naturalizing Isabel Bouillon.
| Beuzeville's Naturalization Act 1773 | 13 Geo. 3. c. 26 Pr. | 16 March 1773 |
An Act for naturalizing Stephen Beuzeville.
| Earl of Shaftesbury's Estate Act 1773 | 13 Geo. 3. c. 27 Pr. | 1 April 1773 |
An Act to enable Trustees to make Leases of certain Estates late of Anthony Earl of Shaftesbury deceased, during the Minorities of his Children; and for establishing and carrying into Execution an Agreement made between Mary Countess Dowager or Shaftesbury as Guardian of Anthony Ashley, now Earl of Shaftesbury, her infant Son, and the Lord Bishop of Ely, respecting certain Messuages and Tenements situate in the Parish of Saint Andrew, Holbourn, in the County of Middlesex.
| Earl of Hopetoun's Estate Act 1773 | 13 Geo. 3. c. 28 Pr. | 1 April 1773 |
An Act for vesting in John Earl of Hopetoun, and his Heirs, in Fee-Simple, certain Lands, Part of his Entailed Estate, in the Counties of Haddington and Fife; and for settling in Lieu thereof other Lands lying contiguous to, and interspersed with, the said Entailed Estate.
| Bernard's Estate Act 1773 | 13 Geo. 3. c. 29 Pr. | 1 April 1773 |
An Act for vesting the Manors East and West Stodeley, and certain other Hereditaments in the County of Devon, (Part of the Settled Estates of James Bernard Esquire), in Trustees to be conveyed to Mathew Brickdale Esquire, and his Heirs, pursuant to an Agreement entered into by him for the Purchase thereof; and for applying the Purchase Money in Discharge of a Mortgage affecting the said Premises; and for other Purposes therein mentioned.
| Hemming's Estate Act 1773 | 13 Geo. 3. c. 30 Pr. | 1 April 1773 |
An Act for vesting the Settled Estate of the Reverend Samuel Hemming Clerk, and Maria his Wife, in the County of Stafford, in Trustees, in order that the same may be conveyed to George Adams Esquire, and his Heirs, pursuant to an Agreement made by him for the Purchase thereof; and for vesting the Purchase Money in other Lands and Hereditaments to be settled to the like Uses.
| Whichcot's Estate Act 1773 | 13 Geo. 3. c. 31 Pr. | 1 April 1773 |
An Act for exonerating Part of the Real Estate of Thomas Whichcot Esquire in the County of Lincoln, from a Debt of Ten thousand Pounds charged thereon, for the Portions of the younger Children of Christopher Whichcote Esquire, and Jone his Wife, Daughter of the said Thomas Whichcot; and for subjecting and charging other Lands of greater Value to the Payment thereof.
| Enabling the vicar of Kensington (Middlesex) to grant leases of part of vicarage glebe land. | 13 Geo. 3. c. 32 Pr. | 1 April 1773 |
An Act to enable the Vicar of Kensington, in the County of Middlesex, to grant Leases of Part of the Glebe Lands belonging to the said Vicarage.
| Drayton-in-Hales Inclosure Act 1773 | 13 Geo. 3. c. 33 Pr. | 1 April 1773 |
An Act for dividing and enclosing several Commons, Heaths, and Waste Grounds, within the Parish of Drayton in Hales, in the Counties of Salop and Stafford.
| Goxhill Inclosure Act 1773 | 13 Geo. 3. c. 34 Pr. | 1 April 1773 |
An Act for dividing and enclosing several Lands and Grounds in the Parish of Coxhill, in the County of Lincoln.
| East Hadden Inclosure Act 1773 | 13 Geo. 3. c. 35 Pr. | 1 April 1773 |
An Act for dividing and enclosing the Open and Common Fields, Common Meadows, Common Pastures, Heath, Lot, and Waste Ground, in the Parish of East Haddon, in the County of Northampton.
| Confirming and establishing an agreement concerning Chatteris (Isle of Ely, Cambridgeshire) Common Lands regulation. | 13 Geo. 3. c. 36 Pr. | 1 April 1773 |
An Act for confirming and establishing Articles of Agreement for the better ordering and regulating the Manner of feeding, using, and enjoying, several Commonable and Waste Grounds lying in Chatteris, in the Isle of Ely and County of Cambridge; and also for ascertaining the Parts or Lots belonging to each Commoner, in certain Fens therein mentioned; and for empowering the Commoners to plough and cultivate the said Fens for a certain Number of Years therein limited; and for obliging Occupiers of Lands in the Open Fields of Chatteris to fence the same.
| East Keal or Easter Keal (Lincolnshire) Inclosure Act 1773 | 13 Geo. 3. c. 37 Pr. | 1 April 1773 |
An Act for dividing and enclosing certain Open Common Fields, Meadows, Ings, and other Commonable Lands and Waste Grounds, within the Township and Parish of East Keal, otherwise Easter Keal, in the County of Lincoln.
| Rugby Inclosure Act 1773 | 13 Geo. 3. c. 38 Pr. | 1 April 1773 |
An Act for dividing and enclosing the Open and Common Fields, Common Pastures, Common Meadows, Common Grounds, Heath and Waste Ground, in the Manor and Parish of Rugby, in the County of Warwick.
| Everthorpe Inclosure Act 1773 | 13 Geo. 3. c. 39 Pr. | 1 April 1773 |
An Act for dividing and enclosing certain Fields, Lands, and Grounds, within the Township or Lordship of Everthorpe, in the Parish of North Cave, in the East Riding of the County of York.
| Toyntons Inclosure Act 1773 | 13 Geo. 3. c. 40 Pr. | 1 April 1773 |
An Act for dividing and enclosing certain Open and Common Fields, Meadows, Ings, and other Commonable Lands and Waste Grounds, within the Manor of Toyntons, in the Townships of Toynton all Saints and Toynton Saint Peter's, in the County of Lincoln.
| Hemingby Inclosure Act 1773 | 13 Geo. 3. c. 41 Pr. | 1 April 1773 |
An Act for dividing and enclosing certain Open Common Fields, Ings, Common Pastures, and other Commonable Lands, within the Manors or Manor and Township of Hemingby, in the County of Lincoln.
| Witton-le-Wear and North Bedburne (Durham) Inclosure Act 1773 | 13 Geo. 3. c. 42 Pr. | 1 April 1773 |
An Act for dividing and enclosing certain Moors or Commons, within the Townships of Witton le Wear and North Bedburne, within the Chapelry of Witton le Wear, in the Manor of Wolsingham, in the County Palatine of Durham.
| Wilton Inclosure Act 1773 | 13 Geo. 3. c. 43 Pr. | 1 April 1773 |
An Act for dividing and enclosing certain Open Fields, Lands, and Grounds, within the Township or Lordship of Wilton, in the Parish of Ellerburn, in the North Riding of the County of York.
| Thorpe on the Hill Inclosure Act 1773 | 13 Geo. 3. c. 44 Pr. | 1 April 1773 |
An Act for dividing and enclosing certain Open and Common Fields, Meadows, Pastures, Furze, and Waste Grounds, in the Parish of Thorpe on the Hill, in the County of Lincoln.
| Sambourn in Coughton Inclosure Act 1773 | 13 Geo. 3. c. 45 Pr. | 1 April 1773 |
An Act for dividing and enclosing the Common and Waste Land, within the Manor of Sambourn, in the Parish of Coughton, in the County of Warwick.
| Nafford and Birlingham (Worcestershire) Inclosure Act 1773 | 13 Geo. 3. c. 46 Pr. | 1 April 1773 |
An Act for dividing and enclosing several Open and Common Fields, Common Meadows, and other Commonable Lands and Places, within the Parish of Nafford and Chapelry of Birlingham, in the County of Worcester.
| Robert Athorpe Blanchard: change of name to Athorpe only, pursuant to the will of Henry Athorpe. | 13 Geo. 3. c. 47 Pr. | 1 April 1773 |
An Act to enable Robert Athorpe Blanchard Esquire, now called Robert Athorpe Athorpe, and his Heirs Male, to take and use the Surname of Athorpe only, pursuant to the Will of Henry Athorpe Esquire deceased.
| Franel's Naturalization Act 1773 | 13 Geo. 3. c. 48 Pr. | 1 April 1773 |
An Act for naturalizing Joseph Franel.
| Earl of Macclesfield's Estate Act 1773 | 13 Geo. 3. c. 49 Pr. | 7 April 1773 |
An Act for vesting certain Tenements and Hereditaments, in the Counties of Oxford, Derks, and Wilts, Part of the Settled Estates of the Earl of Macclesfield, in Trustees, to be sold or exchanged, and the Money arising thereby to be laid out in the Purchase of other Lands, Tenements, and Hereditaments, to be settled to the same Uses, and for other Purposes therein mentioned.
| Enabling the dean and chapter of Worcester Cathedral to exchange lands and premises in Worcestershire with Thomas Foley. | 13 Geo. 3. c. 50 Pr. | 7 April 1773 |
An Act to enable the Dean and Chapter of the Cathedral Church of Worcester to make and, establish an Exchange of certain Lands and Premises, in the County of Worcester, for other Lands and Premises, in the said County, belonging to Thomas Foley Esquire.
| Almshouse or hospital of Jesus in Gisburn (Cleveland) estate: conveying lands to Charles Turner and execution of an agreement for the purchase of lands in Birkby (Yorkshire, North Riding) from Reverend Henry Hewgill for the use and benefit of said charity. | 13 Geo. 3. c. 51 Pr. | 7 April 1773 |
An Act to empower the Wardens, Preceptor, or Master, of the Scholars and Poor People of the Alms House or Hospital of Jesus, in Gisburn, in Cleveland, in the County of York, to convey a certain Messuage, and divers Lands, Tenements, and Hereditaments, the Estate of the said Alms House or Hospital, unto Charles Turner of Kirkleatham, in the said Courty, Esquire, and his Heirs; and to enable the said Wardens, Preceptor, or Master of the Scholars and Poor People of the Alms House or Hospital of Jesus, to carry into Execution an Agreement with the Reverend Henry Hewgill of Hornby Grainge, in the said County of York, Clerk, for the Purchase of a certain Messuage or Tenement, Lands, and Hereditaments, in the Parish of Birkby, in the North Riding of the said County, of greater Value, to be conveyed to and held by them, and their successors, for the Use, Benefit, and Advancement, of the said Charity.
| Exchange of lands between Charles Turner and Trinity College, Cambridge. | 13 Geo. 3. c. 52 Pr. | 7 April 1773 |
An Act for effecting an Exchange of Lands between Charles Turner Esquire, and the Master, Fellows, and Scholars, of Trinity College, in Cambridge.
| Nominating a person, in the room of Thomas Cartwright, to join with Elizabeth Cartwright in directing the sale of said Thomas Cartwright's estate for raising £5,000. | 13 Geo. 3. c. 53 Pr. | 7 April 1773 |
An Act for nominating a Person in the Room of Thomas Cartwright Esquire deceased, to join with Elizabeth Cartwright Widow, in directing the Sale of such Part or Parts of the Settled Estates of the said Thomas Cartwright deceased, as they shall think proper, for raising Five thousand seven hundred Pounds, and for other Purposes.
| Theobald's Estate Act 1773 | 13 Geo. 3. c. 54 Pr. | 7 April 1773 |
An Act to enable James Theobald Esquire to carry into Execution an Agreement for Sale of certain Hereditaments, situate at White Woltham, in the County of Berks, (Part of his Settled Estates), to the Reverend William Reid; and for laying out the Money arising by such Sale in the Purchase of other Lands and Hereditaments, to be settled to the Uses to which the said Settled Estates do now stand limited.
| Stockport (Cheshire) Parish Church Estate Act 1773 (repealed) | 13 Geo. 3. c. 55 Pr. | 7 April 1773 |
An Act to enable the Rector of the Parish Church of Stockport, in the County of Chester, for the Time being, to grant Leases of Part of the Glebe Lands belonging to the said Rectory, and to exchange Part of the said Glebe Lands and other Lands in the Township of Stockport aforesaid, between Sir George Warren Knight of the Bath, Patron of the Advowson of the said Rectory, and John Watson, present Rector of the Parish and Parish Church of Stockport aforesaid. (Repealed by St. Mary Stockport Rectory Act 1910 (10 Edw. 7 & 1 Geo. 5. c. xxxiii))
| East Cottingwith Inclosure Act 1773 | 13 Geo. 3. c. 56 Pr. | 7 April 1773 |
An Act for dividing and enclosing the Open Fields, Pasture Grounds, Ings, and Common or Waste Ground, within the Township of East Cottingwith, in the East Riding of the County of York.
| Burstwick and Shecking Inclosure Act 1773 | 13 Geo. 3. c. 57 Pr. | 7 April 1773 |
An Act for dividing and enclosing the Open Arable Fields, Meadow, and Pasture Grounds, within the Town and Territories of Burstwick and Skeckling, in the Parish of Skeckling cum Burstwick, in Holderness, in the East Riding of the County of York.
| Houghton cum Witton Inclosure Act 1773 | 13 Geo. 3. c. 58 Pr. | 7 April 1773 |
An Act for dividing, allotting, and enclosing, the Open and Common Fields, Meadows, Commonable Lands, and Commons, within the Manor, Parish, Township, and Liberties of Houghton cum Witton, in the County of Huntingdon.
| Falsgrave Inclosure Act 1773 | 13 Geo. 3. c. 59 Pr. | 7 April 1773 |
An Act for dividing and enclosing the Open Commons and Waste Grounds, within the Manor and Township of Walsgrave otherwise Falsgrave, in the Parish of Scarborough, in the North Riding of the County of York.
| Swalcliffe Inclosure Act 1773 | 13 Geo. 3. c. 60 Pr. | 7 April 1773 |
An Act for dividing and enclosing the Open and Common Field and Commonable Land, lying within the Townships, Liberties, and Precincts, of Broad Sibford otherwise Sibford Gower, and Burdrup, in the Parish of Swalcliffe, in the County of Oxford.
| Whitgreave Inclosure Act 1773 | 13 Geo. 3. c. 61 Pr. | 7 April 1773 |
An Act for dividing, enclosing, and allotting, the Open or Common Fields, Meadows, Pastures, Commonable Places, and other Lands and Grounds, within the Township of Whitgreave, in the County of Stafford.
| Whitton Inclosure Act 1773 | 13 Geo. 3. c. 62 Pr. | 7 April 1773 |
An Act for dividing and enclosing several Open Fields, Lands, and Grounds, in the Parish of Whitton, in the County of Lincoln.
| Preston Inclosure Act 1773 | 13 Geo. 3. c. 63 Pr. | 7 April 1773 |
An Act for dividing, allotting, and enclosing, the Open and Commonable Fields, Meadows, Lands, and Waste Grounds, of, within, and belonging to, the Manor, Parish, and Liberties, of Preston, in the County of Rutland.
| Newbold upon Avon and Long Lawford Heath (Warwickshire) Inclosure Act 1773 | 13 Geo. 3. c. 64 Pr. | 7 April 1773 |
An Act for dividing and enclosing the Open and Common Fields of Newbold upon Avon, in the County of Warwick, and Long Lawford Heath, in the Parish of Newbold aforesaid.
| Hackonby Inclosure Act 1773 | 13 Geo. 3. c. 65 Pr. | 7 April 1773 |
An Act for dividing and enclosing the Open Common Fields, Meadow Grounds, and Common Fens, in the Parish of Hackonby, in the County of Lincoln.
| Tingewick and Radclive-cum-Chackmore (Buckinghamshire) Inclosures Act 1773 | 13 Geo. 3. c. 66 Pr. | 7 April 1773 |
An Act for dividing and enclosing the Commons, Wastes, and Common Fields, in the Parishes of Tingewick and Radclive cum Chackmore, in the County of Bucks.
| Lanchester Inclosure Act 1773 | 13 Geo. 3. c. 67 Pr. | 7 April 1773 |
An Act for dividing and enclosing certain Moors, Commons, or Tracts of Waste Land, within the Parish and Manor of Lanchester in the County Palatine of Durham.
| Kinfare and Compton Common Inclosure Act 1773 | 13 Geo. 3. c. 68 Pr. | 7 April 1773 |
An Act for dividing, enclosing, and allotting, a certain Common or Parcel of Waste Land, called Kinfare and Compton Common, within the Manor and Parish of Kinven otherwise Kinfare, in the County of Stafford.
| Harpham Inclosure Act 1773 | 13 Geo. 3. c. 69 Pr. | 7 April 1773 |
An Act for dividing and enclosing the several Open Arable Fields, Parcels of Meadow or Pasture, and other Grounds, within the Township of Harpham, in the Parish of Agnes-Burton, in the East Riding of the County of York.
| Skipton and Kildwick Inclosure Act 1773 | 13 Geo. 3. c. 70 Pr. | 7 April 1773 |
An Act for dividing and enclosing a certain Open Field, and the Commons, Common of Pasture, and Waste Grounds, within the Parishes of Skipton and Kildwick, in the County of York.
| Bowerbank's Divorce Act 1773 | 13 Geo. 3. c. 71 Pr. | 7 April 1773 |
An Act to dissolve the Marriage of John Featherston Bowerbank with Anne Jane Bennett his now Wife, and to enable him to marry again; and for other Purposes therein mentioned.
| Edward Gregge Name Act 1773 | 13 Geo. 3. c. 72 Pr. | 7 April 1773 |
An Act to enable Edward Gregge Hopwood (late Edward Gregge) Esquire, and the Heirs Male of his Body, and the other Persons therein described, to retain, take, and use, the Surname of Hopwood, and to bear and quarter the Arms of Hopwood, pursuant to the Will of Robert Hopwood deceased.
| Miller's Estate Act 1773 | 13 Geo. 3. c. 73 Pr. | 10 May 1773 |
An Act for vesting certain Manors, Lands, and Tenements, in the Isle of Wight, Part of the Settled Estate of Sir Thomas Miller Baronet, in Trustees, to be sold; and for purchasing other Lands and Hereditaments, to be settled to the same Uses.
| Hudson's Estate Act 1773 | 13 Geo. 3. c. 74 Pr. | 10 May 1773 |
An Act for discharging divers Messuages, Lands, and Hereditaments, Part of the Estate of John Hudson, late of Bessingby, in the County of York, Esquire, deceased, from the Uses of his Marriage Settlement; and for settling other Lands and Hereditaments to the same Uses.
| Smith's Estate Act 1773 | 13 Geo. 3. c. 75 Pr. | 10 May 1773 |
An Act for vesting the Moiety of the Manor of Russels, and the Moiety of divers Messuages, Lands, and Hereditaments, with the Appurtenances, in Chesilford otherwise Chilford, and other Places, in the County of Suffolk, comprised in the Settlement made previous to the Marriage of Mr. Charles Smith and Elizabeth his now Wife, late Elizabeth Bishop Spinster, in Trustees, to be sold; and for purchasing other Lands and Hereditaments, to be settled to the like Uses.
| Exchange of lands in Sedbergh (Yorkshire) between the Edward VI Free Grammar School there and Walter Vavasour. | 13 Geo. 3. c. 76 Pr. | 10 May 1773 |
An Act to enable the Governors of the Free Grammar School of Edward the Sixth late King of England, in the Town of Sedbergh, in the County of York, to exchange certain Lands and Possessions of the said School, therein mentioned, with Walter Vavasour of Weston, in the said County, Esquire, for other Lands in the Parish of Sedbergh aforesaid, of greater Value, to be settled to the same Uses.
| M'Culloch's Estate Act 1773 | 13 Geo. 3. c. 77 Pr. | 10 May 1773 |
An Act for empowering the judges of the Court of Session in Scotland, to sell such Part or Parts of the Estate of Barholm, in the Stewartry of Kirkcudbright, belonging to John M'Culloch, now of Barholm, as shall be sufficient for Payment of the Debts affecting the same; and for settling the Remainder of the said Estate in Tail on the same Series of Heirs, and in the same Manner as is mentioned in a Deed of Entail, made in the Year One thousand seven hundred and sixty-two.
| Roan's Charity (Greenwich) Estate Act 1773 | 13 Geo. 3. c. 78 Pr. | 10 May 1773 |
An Act to empower the Feoffees of Roan's Charity, in Greenwich, to sell a Messuage and Two Pieces of Land, Part of the Estate of the said Charity, to the Vicar of the said Parish; and to apply the Money arising by such Sale in the Purchase of other Lands, to be conveyed to the like Uses; and to enable the said Vicar to take a Conveyance of the said Messuage and Two Pieces of Land; and for other Purposes therein mentioned.
| Henley's Estates Act 1773 | 13 Geo. 3. c. 79 Pr. | 10 May 1773 |
An Act for selling the Settled Estates of Henry Cornish Henley Esquire, in Lyme Regis, Wootton Fitz-pain, and Maiden Newton, in the County of Dorset; and for laying out the Money to arise thereby in the Purchase of other Lands and Hereditaments, to be settled to the same Uses as the said Settled Estates now stand limited.
| Beckford, Grafton, Ashton Underhill and Bengrove (Gloucestershire) Inclosure Act 1773 | 13 Geo. 3. c. 80 Pr. | 10 May 1773 |
An Act for dividing and enclosing the Open and Common Fields, and all other Commonable Lands, and certain Lot Ground, within the several Villages or Townships of Beckford, Grafton, Ashton Underbill, and Bengroze, in the Parish of Bedford, and County of Gloucester.
| Sheasby Inclosure Act 1773 | 13 Geo. 3. c. 81 Pr. | 10 May 1773 |
An Act for dividing and enclosing the Open and Common Fields and Common Pastures of Sheasby, in the Parish of Knaptoft, and County of Leicester.
| Helpringham Inclosure Act 1773 | 13 Geo. 3. c. 82 Pr. | 10 May 1773 |
An Act for dividing and enclosing the Open Common Fields, Meadow Grounds, Common Fen, Cow Pasture, and other Commonable Lands, in the Parish of Helpringham, in the County of Lincoln.
| Hognaston Inclosure Act 1773 | 13 Geo. 3. c. 83 Pr. | 10 May 1773 |
An Act for dividing and enclosing certain Commons or Pastures, called Hognaston Wynn and Hognaston Oldfield, within the Liberty of Hognaston, in the County of Derby.
| Longmarston Inclosure Act 1773 | 13 Geo. 3. c. 84 Pr. | 10 May 1773 |
An Act for dividing and enclosing the Open and Common Fields, Common Meadows, and Commonable Lands, within the Parish of Longmarston, in the County of Gloucester.
| Little Stukely Inclosure Act 1773 | 13 Geo. 3. c. 85 Pr. | 10 May 1773 |
An Act for dividing, allotting, and enclosing, the Open and Common, Fields, Meadows, Commonable Lands, and Commons, within the Manor, Parish, and Liberties, of Little Stukely, in the County of Huntingdon.
| Preston in Holderness Inclosure Act 1773 | 13 Geo. 3. c. 86 Pr. | 10 May 1773 |
An Act for dividing and enclosing the Open Arable Fields, Meadow and Pasture Grounds, within the Township of Preston in Holdernesse, in the East Riding of the County of York.
| Groppenhall and Latchford (Cheshire) Inclosure Act 1773 | 13 Geo. 3. c. 87 Pr. | 10 May 1773 |
An Act for severing, dividing, enclosing, and allotting, divers Parcels of Common or Waste Grounds, within the Townships of Groppenball and Latchford, in the County Palatine of Chester.
| Drax Inclosure Act 1773 | 13 Geo. 3. c. 88 Pr. | 10 May 1773 |
An Act for dividing and enclosing the several Open Fields, within the Township and Parish of Drax, in the West Riding of the County of York.
| Holme upon Spalding Moor Inclosure Act 1773 | 13 Geo. 3. c. 89 Pr. | 10 May 1773 |
An Act for dividing and enclosing the several Open Fields, Carrs, Ings, or Meadow Grounds, and Commons or Waste Grounds, within the Township and Parish of Holme upon Spalding Moor, in the East Riding of the County of York.
| Gordon's Divorce Act 1773 | 13 Geo. 3. c. 90 Pr. | 10 May 1773 |
An Act to dissolve the Marriage of John Gordon Esquire with John Norris Fisher his now Wife, and to enable him to marry again; and for other Purposes therein mentioned.
| Green's Divorce Act 1773 | 13 Geo. 3. c. 91 Pr. | 10 May 1773 |
An Act to dissolve the Marriage of John Green Clerk with Elizabeth Green his now Wife, and to enable him to marry again; and for other Purposes therein mentioned.
| Sir Edward and Sir Walter Blackett's estate in Ryton (Durham): partition and division. | 13 Geo. 3. c. 92 Pr. | 28 May 1773 |
An Act for making a Partition and Division of certain Estates in the Parish of Ryton, in the County of Durham, between Sir Edward Blackett Baronet and Sir Walter Blackett Baronet, pursuant to an Agreement made between them.
| Heron's Estate Act 1773 | 13 Geo. 3. c. 93 Pr. | 28 May 1773 |
An Act for the Division, Allotment, and, Appropriation, of several Messuages, Lands, and Hereditaments, in the several Counties of Leicester, Nottingham, and Lincoln, the Estates of Thomas Heron Esquire, whereof he is either Tenant for Life under different Settlements, or whereunto he is entitled, to him and his Heirs, in Fee-Simple.
| Child's Estate Act 1773 | 13 Geo. 3. c. 94 Pr. | 28 May 1773 |
An Act for vesting Part of the Settled Estate of Smith Child Gentleman, in the County of Stafford, in Trustees, to be sold, to raise Money to pay off the Incumbrances charged upon and affecting the same, and for other Purposes therein mentioned.
| Spelman's Estate Act 1773 | 13 Geo. 3. c. 95 Pr. | 28 May 1773 |
An Act for Sale of the Settled Estate of Henry Spelman Clerk, in the County of Norfolk, and for other Purposes therein mentioned.
| Sale of certain charity estates to fund a new townhall and shambles, a larger churchyard and for opening avenues in Newark upon Trent and to purchase lands for charitable uses with any residue sale proceeds. (repealed) | 13 Geo. 3. c. 96 Pr. | 28 May 1773 |
An Act for Sale of certain Charity Estates therein mentioned, and to apply the Money to arise therefrom in the Building of a Town-Hall and Shambles in the Town of Newark upon Trent; and in the purchasing of Lands and Hereditaments for enlarging the Church Yard of the said Town; and for opening the Avenues thereto; and for laying out the Residue of the Money in purchasing other Lands, to be settled to the Charitable Uses therein mentioned. (Repealed by Statute Law (Repeals) Act 1995 (c. 44))
| Establishing and rendering effectual agreements concerning the fee farm and customary tenants of Tatham and Hornby manors. | 13 Geo. 3. c. 97 Pr. | 28 May 1773 |
An Act for establishing and rendering effectual certain Articles of Agreement enabling the several Fee-Farm and Customary Tenants within the Honour, Manor, and Lordship, of Hornby, and Manor of Tatham, in the County Palatine of Lancaster, to purchase the Timber Trees and Underwoods growing upon their respective Tenements; and for vesting the sole Property thereof in them respectively, and extinguishing the Customary Right of the other Tenants therein; and for releasing and extinguishing the Freehold, Fee-Farm, and Customary Rents, Boons, Fines, and other Services of Right due and accustomed, for the Tenements of such of the said Tenants who have executed the said Articles of Agreement, and of such who shall, within the Time limited by this Act, come in and purchase their Timber Trees, Woods, and Underwoods, Rents, Boons, Fines, and Franchisements, with such Exceptions and Reservations only as are in this Act mentioned.
| Empowering Reverend Ptolemy Humfrey and Reverend John Jephcot and his wife Catherina Dorothea to exchange part of Thorpe Mandaville (Northamptonshire) rectory glebe for part of Richard Jenning's estate in Thorpe Mandaville and for appointing other of his lands in said parish in lieu of tithes. | 13 Geo. 3. c. 98 Pr. | 28 May 1773 |
An Act to empower the Reverend Ptolomy Humfrey Clerk, and the Reverend John Jephcot Clerk and Catherina Dorothea his Wife, to exchange a Messuage and certain Closes in Thorp Mandeville, in the County of Northampton, Part of the Glebe of the Rectory of Thorp Mandeville aforesaid, for a Messuage, Two small Cottages, and several Closes and Lands, in Thorp Mandeville aforesaid, Part of the Estate of Richard Jennings of Weston, in the County of Northampton, Esquire; and for the setting out, assigning, and appointing other Closes, Lands, or Grounds, of the said Richard Jennings in Thorp Mandeville aforesaid, in Lieu of Tythes; and for other the Purposes therein mentioned.
| Kirkby Thore Inclosure Act 1773 | 13 Geo. 3. c. 99 Pr. | 28 May 1773 |
An Act for dividing and enclosing several Tracts or Parcels of Common and Waste Ground, called and known by the respective Names of Temple Sowerby Moor, The Down Moor, The Whinns, and Parson’s Close, within the Parish of Kirkby Thore, in the County of Westmorland.
| Galey Common Inclosure Act 1773 | 13 Geo. 3. c. 100 Pr. | 28 May 1773 |
An Act for dividing and enclosing a certain Parcel of Common or Waste Land called Galey Common, lying within the Manor or Lordship of Galey, in the County of Stafford.
| Culgaithe Inclosure Act 1773 | 13 Geo. 3. c. 101 Pr. | 28 May 1773 |
An Act for dividing and enclosing the Common and Waste Grounds, within the Manor or Township of Culgaithe, in the County of Cumberland.
| Stanton Harcourt Inclosure Act 1773 | 13 Geo. 3. c. 102 Pr. | 28 May 1773 |
An Act for dividing, allotting, and enclosing, the Common Fields, Common Meadows, and other Commonable Lands, in the Manor and Parish of Stanton Harcourt, in the County of Oxford.
| Trysull and Seisdon Inclosure Act 1773 | 13 Geo. 3. c. 103 Pr. | 28 May 1773 |
An Act for dividing and enclosing the Commons and Waste Lands, within the Manor of Trysull and Seisdon, in the Parish of Trysull, in the County of Stafford.
| Haltham and Roughton (Lincolnshire) Inclosure Act 1773 | 13 Geo. 3. c. 104 Pr. | 28 May 1773 |
An Act for dividing and enclosing certain Open and Common Fields, Meadows, Ings, Moors, Common Pastures, and other Commonable Lands, within the Manors of Haltham cum Roughton, in the Townships of Haltham and Roughton, in the County of Lincoln.
| Round Acton, Morvil Barrow, Much Wenlock and Astley Abbots (Salop.) inclosures. | 13 Geo. 3. c. 105 Pr. | 28 May 1773 |
An Act for dividing and enclosing certain Commons and Waste Lands, in the several Parishes of Round Acton, Morvil Barrow, Much Wenlock, and Astley Abbots, in the County of Salop.
| Swineshead and Wigtoft Marsh (Lincolnshire) Inclosure Act 1773 | 13 Geo. 3. c. 106 Pr. | 28 May 1773 |
An Act for dividing and enclosing the several Parcels of Fen and other Commonable Lands, within the Parish of Swineshead, in the County of Lincoln; and also a certain Plot of Land called Wigtoft Marsh, in and near to the said Parish of Swineshead.
| Horseington Inclosure Act 1773 | 13 Geo. 3. c. 107 Pr. | 28 May 1773 |
An Act tor dividing and enclosing the Open and Common Fields and Commonable Lands, within the Manor and Parish of Horsington, in the County of Lincoln.
| Cade's Divorce Act 1773 | 13 Geo. 3. c. 108 Pr. | 28 May 1773 |
An Act to dissolve the Marriage of Philip Cade Esquire with Catharine Whitworth his now Wife, and to enable him to marry again; and for other Purposes therein mentioned.
| Villers' Naturalization Act 1773 | 13 Geo. 3. c. 109 Pr. | 28 May 1773 |
An Act for naturalizing William Billers, an Infant.
| Duke of Beaufort's estate: sale of part and purchase and settling another in Monmouthshire. | 13 Geo. 3. c. 110 Pr. | 21 June 1773 |
An Act for vesting Part of the Estates strictly entailed by the Will of the Most Noble Charles Noel late Duke of Beaufort, in Trustees, to be sold; and for applying the Money arising by such Sale in the Purchase of other Manors, Lands, and Hereditaments, in the County of Monmouth, to be settled to the same Uses.
| Earl of Scarborough's Estate Act 1773 | 13 Geo. 3. c. 111 Pr. | 21 June 1773 |
An Act for discharging the Manor of Greenfield, and divers Messuages, Lands, and Hereditaments, in the County of Lincoln, Part of the Estate of Richard Earl of Scarbrough, from the Uses, Estates, and Trults, declared concerning the same by the Settlement executed previous to his Marriage with Barbara Countess of Scarbrough his Wife, and for settling other Lands and Hereditaments, of greater Value, in Lieu thereof, to the like Uses.
| Turner's Estate Act 1773 | 13 Geo. 3. c. 112 Pr. | 21 June 1773 |
An Act for vesting divers Freehold and Leasehold Estates, and certain Goods and Chattels, late of Sir Edward Turner Baronet deceased, in Sir Gregory Turner Baronet his eldest Son, as a Compensation for, and in Satisfaction of, his Claims on his laid late Father’s Estate and Effects.
| Adderley's Estates Act 1773 | 13 Geo. 3. c. 113 Pr. | 21 June 1773 |
An Act for vesting Part of the Settled Estates of Cherles Bowyer Adderley Esquire, in the Parishes of Hanbury and Leigh, in the County of Stafford, in Trustees, to be sold for Payment of the Incumbrances affecting the same, and for laying out the Residue of the Money arising by such Sale in the Purchase of other Lands and Hereditaments to be settled to the like Uses.
| Hooknorton and Southtop (Oxfordshire) Inclosures Act 1773 | 13 Geo. 3. c. 114 Pr. | 21 June 1773 |
An Act for dividing and enclosing the Open and Common Fields, Common Meadows, Common Pastures, Common Grounds, and Commonable Lands, within the Parish and Liberties of Hook-norton and Southrop, in the County of Oxford.
| West Willoughby Inclosure Act 1773 | 13 Geo. 3. c. 115 Pr. | 21 June 1773 |
An Act for dividing and enclosing the Open and Common Fields and Lands, Common Heath and Waste Grounds, within the Township of West Willoughby, in the Manor of Sudbrooke and Parish of Ancaster, in the County of Lincoln.
| Louis' Naturalization Act 1773 | 13 Geo. 3. c. 116 Pr. | 21 June 1773 |
An Act for naturalizing Jacques otherwise James Louis, an Infant under the Age of Eighteen Years.

=== Sources ===
- The Statutes at Large. Vol. 30 - 13 George III - 1772-3 – via Internet Archive.
- The Statutes at Large. Vol. 30 - 13 George III - 1772-3 – via Internet Archive.
- Journal of the House of Commons. Vol. 34. London: His Majesty's Stationery Office. 1804. pp. 3–390.
- Chronological Table of and Index to the Statutes. Vol. 1: To the End of the Session 59 Vict. Sess. 2 (1895) (13th ed.). London: Her Majesty's Stationery Office. 1896. pp. 129–130 – via Google Books.
- "Acts of the Parliament of Great Britain from 1773". legislation.gov.uk. The National Archives.

== See also ==
- List of acts of the Parliament of Great Britain
