= British Nationality Act 1772 =

Act of the Parliament of Great Britain

British Nationality Act 1772 (Note: The citation of this act by this short title was authorised by section 1 of, and the first schedule to, the Short Titles Act 1896. Due to the repeal of those provisions it is now authorised by section 19(2) of the Interpretation Act 1978.)
- Act of Parliament
- Parliament of Great Britain
- Long title: An Act to extend the Provisions of an Act, made in the Fourth Year of the Reign of His late Majesty King George the Second, intituled, An Act to explain a Clause in an Act made in the Seventh Year of the Reign of Her late Majesty Queen Anne, for naturalizing Foreign Protestants, which relates to the Children of the natural-born Subjects of the Crown of England, or of Great Britain, to the Children of such Children.
- Citation: 13 Geo. 3. c. 21
- Territorial extent: Great Britain

Dates
- Royal assent: 16 March 1773
- Commencement: 26 November 1772 (Note: Start of session)
- Repealed: 1 January 1915
Other legislation
Amends	Foreign Protestants Naturalization Act 1708; British Nationality Act 1730
Amended by	Promissory Oaths Act 1871; Statute Law Revision Act 1888
Repealed by	British Nationality and Status of Aliens Act 1914

Status: Repealed

Text of statute as originally enacted

The British Nationality Act 1772 (13 Geo. 3. c. 21) was an act of the Parliament of Great Britain. It was a British nationality law which made general provision allowing natural-born allegiance (citizenship) to be assumed if the father alone was British.

The act was one of the British Subjects Acts 1708 to 1772.

== Subsequent developments ==
Section 3 of the act was repealed by section 1 of, and part II of schedule one to, the Promissory Oaths Act 1871 (34 & 35 Vict. c. 48), which came into force on 13 July 1871.

The whole act was repealed by section 28(1) of, and the third schedule to, the British Nationality and Status of Aliens Act 1914 (4 & 5 Geo. 5. c. 17), which came into force on 1 January 1915.
