= Foreign Protestants Naturalization Act 1708 =

Law granting citizenship to French Huguenots in Britain

Foreign Protestants Naturalization Act 1708 (Note: The citation of this act by this short title was authorised by section 1 of, and the first schedule to, the Short Titles Act 1896. Due to the repeal of those provisions it is now authorised by section 19(2) of the Interpretation Act 1978.)
- Act of Parliament
- Parliament of Great Britain
- Long title: An Act for naturalizing Foreign Protestants. (Note: These words are printed against this act in the second column of the first schedule to the Short Titles Act 1896, which is headed "Title".)
- Citation: 7 Ann. c. 5 (Note: This is the citation in The Statutes of the Realm); 7 Ann. c. 9 (Note: This is the citation in The Statutes at Large)
- Territorial extent: Great Britain

Dates
- Royal assent: 23 March 1709
- Commencement: 16 November 1708 (Note: Start of session.)
- Repealed: 1 January 1915
Other legislation
Amended by	Naturalization Act 1711; British Nationality Act 1730; British Nationality Act 1772; Statute Law Revision Act 1888
Repealed by	British Nationality and Status of Aliens Act 1914
Relates to	Naturalization Act 1714

Status: Repealed

Text of statute as originally enacted

Naturalization Act 1711
- Act of Parliament
- Parliament of Great Britain
- Long title: An Act to repeal the Act of the Seventh Year of Her Majesty's Reign, intituled, "An Act for naturalizing Foreign Protestants," except what relates to the Children of Her Majesty's Natural-born Subjects, born out of Her Majesty's Allegiance.
- Citation: 10 Ann. c. 9; 10 Ann. c. 5
- Territorial extent: Great Britain

Dates
- Royal assent: 9 February 1712
- Commencement: 7 December 1711 (Note: Start of session.)
- Repealed: 15 July 1867
Other legislation
Amends	Foreign Protestants Naturalization Act 1708
Repealed by	Statute Law Revision Act 1867
Relates to	Naturalization Act 1714

Status: Repealed

Text of statute as originally enacted

The Foreign Protestants Naturalization Act 1708 (7 Ann. c. 5), sometimes referred to as the Foreign and Protestants Naturalization Act 1708, was an act of the Parliament of Great Britain. The act was passed on 23 March 1709, which was still considered part of the year 1708 in the British calendar of the time. It was passed to allow the naturalisation of French Protestants (Huguenots) who had fled to Britain since the revocation of the Edict of Nantes in 1685. It was one of the British Subjects Acts 1708 to 1772.

The Whig majority in Parliament passed the act with the support of both Houses of Parliament, despite some opposition concerning a "conflux of aliens that would be invited over". A counter-argument is presented in the preamble of the act, that "the increase of people is a means of advancing the wealth and strength of a nation".

The effect of the act was that all foreign Protestants could be naturalised, provided they swore allegiance to the government and received sacrament in any Protestant church. Following the passage of the act, up to 12,000 Palatines, Suabians, and other German Lutherans arrived in Britain between May and June 1709, owing to war in those places. Some German Catholics who arrived were sent back, and some immigrants were sent on to Ireland, New York and Carolina.

The act was largely repealed by the Tories in 1711 by the Naturalization Act 1711 (10 Ann. c. 9). The section dealing with naturalizing the children of British subjects born abroad was, however, not repealed. This section says "3. ... the children of all natural born subjects born out of the ligeance of her Majesty her heires and successors shall be deemed adjudged and taken to be natural born subjects of this kingdom to all intents constructions and purposes whatsoever."

== Subsequent developments ==
The whole act was repealed by section 28(1) of, and the third schedule to, the British Nationality and Status of Aliens Act 1914 (4 & 5 Geo. 5. c. 17), which came into force on 1 January 1915.
