= Spring Branch (Little Blue River tributary) =

Stream in Jackson County, Missouri, U.S.

Coordinates: 39.076672°N 94.321616°W

Spring Branch is a stream in Jackson County in the U.S. state of Missouri. It is a tributary of the Little Blue River.

Spring Branch was named for the fact a spring flows into its headwaters.

== See also ==
- List of rivers of Missouri
