= British Nationality and Status of Aliens Act 1914 =

Act of the Parliament of the United Kingdom

British Nationality and Status of Aliens Act 1914 (Note: Section 28(2).)
- Act of Parliament
- Parliament of the United Kingdom
- Long title: An Act to consolidate and amend the Enactments relating to British Nationality and the Status of Aliens.
- Citation: 4 & 5 Geo. 5. c. 17
- Territorial extent: United Kingdom

Dates
- Royal assent: 7 August 1914
- Commencement: 1 January 1915 (Note: Section 28(3).)
Other legislation
Amends	See § Repealed enactments
Repeals/revokes	See § Repealed enactments
Amended by	British Nationality and Status of Aliens Act 1918; British Nationality and Status of Aliens Act 1922; Statute Law Revision Act 1927; British Nationality and Status of Aliens Act 1933; British Nationality and Status of Aliens Act 1943; British Nationality Act 1948

Status: Partially repealed

Text of statute as originally enacted

Revised text of statute as amended

Text of the British Nationality and Status of Aliens Act 1914 as in force today (including any amendments) within the United Kingdom, from legislation.gov.uk.

The British Nationality and Status of Aliens Act 1914 (4 & 5 Geo. 5. c. 17) is an act of the Parliament of the United Kingdom that consolidated enactments related to British nationality and the status of aliens.

The act notably reaffirmed that British women who married foreigners would forfeit their nationality.

== Provisions ==
=== Repealed enactments ===
Section 28(1) of the act repealed 9 enactments, listed in the third schedule to the act.

Citation		Short title	Extent of repeal
25 Edw. 3. stat. 1	Status of Children Born Abroad Act 1350	Statute for those who are born in parts beyond the seas.	From "and in the right of other children" to the end of the statute.
42 Edw. 3. c. 10	Naturalization Act 1368	A statute made at Westminster on the first day of May in the forty-second year of King Edward III.	The whole chapter.
12 & 13 Will. 3. c. 2	Act of Settlement 1701	The Act of Settlement.	In section three the words "naturalized or."
7 Anne c. 5 (Note: This is the citation in The Statutes of the Realm)	Foreign Protestants Naturalization Act 1708	The Foreign Protestants (Naturalization) Act, 1708.	The whole act.
4 Geo. 2. c. 21	British Nationality Act 1730	The British Nationality Act, 1730.	The whole act.
13 Geo. 3. c. 21	British Nationality Act 1772	The British Nationality Act, 1772.	The whole act.
33 & 34 Vict. c. 14	Naturalization Act 1870	The Naturalization Act, 1870.	The whole act.
33 & 34 Vict. c. 102	Naturalization Oath Act 1870	The Naturalization Oath Act, 1870.	The whole act.
58 & 59 Vict. c. 43	Naturalization Act 1895	The Naturalization Act, 1895.	The whole act.

== Subsequent developments ==
Sections 1 to 16, 19 to 26, section 27 (except the definition of "alien"), the words "British Nationality and" from the short title, and all three schedules were repealed by section 34(3) of, and part II of the fourth schedule to, the British Nationality Act 1948 (11 & 12 Geo. 6. c. 56), which came into force on 1 January 1949. The same schedule also removed the words "natural-born" from sections 17 and 18 wherever they appeared. Sections 17 and 18, dealing respectively with the capacity of aliens as to property and the trial of aliens, remain in force.
