= Thanet Canal =

Branch of the Leeds and Liverpool Canal in North Yorkshire, England

Coordinates: 53.961°N 2.016°W

Thanet Canal (Springs Branch)
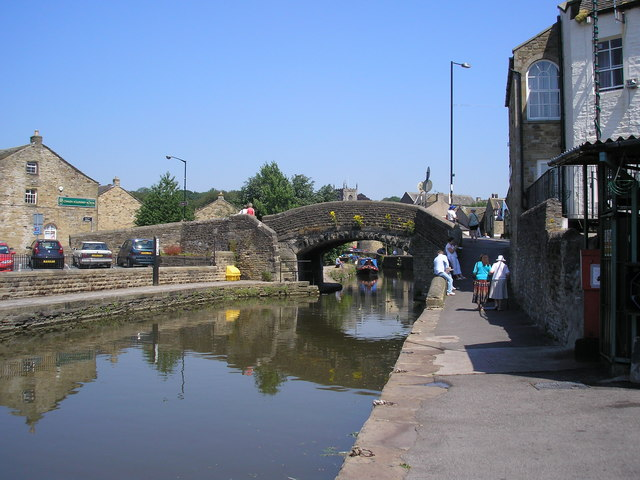
- The Springs Branch leading off northwards from its junction with the Leeds and Liverpool canal
- Interactive map of Thanet Canal (Springs Branch)

Specifications
- Locks: 0
- Status: partly navigable

History
- Original owner: Lord Thanet
- Date of act: 1773

Geography
- Start point: Skipton Castle loading dock
- End point: Skipton
- Connects to: Leeds and Liverpool Canal

The Thanet Canal, also known as the Springs Branch, is a short branch of the Leeds and Liverpool Canal, in North Yorkshire, England. It leaves the main canal in Skipton, and runs to some loading wharfs near Skipton Castle, which were used to load limestone from local quarries into boats for onward shipment. It was opened in 1773, and extended in 1794.

== History ==
Skipton Canal Act 1772
- Act of Parliament
- Parliament of Great Britain
- Long title: An Act to enable the Right Honourable Sackville Earl of Thanet to make a navigable Cut or Canal from a Place called The Spring, lying near Skipton Castle, in the County of York, to join to and communicate with the navigable Canal from Leeds to Liverpoole, in a Close called Hebble End Close, in the Township of Skipton, in the said County of York.
- Citation: 13 Geo. 3. c. 47
- Territorial extent: Great Britain

Dates
- Royal assent: 10 May 1773
- Commencement: 26 November 1772 (Note: Start of session.)

Status: Current legislation

Text of statute as originally enacted

Lord Thanet, who was the owner of Skipton Castle in the late 18th century, owned some limestone quarries near to the castle. When the constructors of the Leeds and Liverpool Canal were building their main line, he petitioned them to alter its route to better serve his quarries. This they refused to do, and so on 10 May 1773 he obtained the Skipton Canal Act 1772 (13 Geo. 3. c. 47) which authorised the construction of a branch canal to serve this purpose. The act did not authorise the raising of capital, as Lord Thanet financed the canal himself, and it was constructed mainly on his own land. Its alternative title of the Springs Branch comes from the fact that the original act was for a Canal from a Place called the Spring, lying near Skipton Castle.

The branch was built quickly, as it was only about one-third mile (0.54 km) long. It left the Leeds and Liverpool canal in the centre of Skipton, and ran around the back of the castle to some loading chutes, into which limestone from the quarries was tipped. In 1785, the Leeds and Liverpool Canal Company took over the lease of the canal. In 1794, a 240-yard (220 m) extension was constructed, to a new loading dock, which was linked to quarries by a tramway. Much of the limestone went to the Low Moor Ironworks in Bradford, where it was used in the smelting of iron. It was also used as road stone, and some of it was burnt to produce lime, for use as a fertiliser and in the production of mortar.

As built, the tramway terminus was a lot higher than the canal, and long chutes were used to load the limestone into boats. Because this caused damage to the boats and the noise disturbed the occupants of the castle, a steeper tramway was constructed, which resulted in shorter chutes, less noise and less damage. One of the shorter metal chutes is still visible on the canal bank, below the castle walls.

Since January 2016 the branch has been closed beyond Mill Bridge after a rock fall from the cliff face beneath Skipton Castle.

== See also ==
- Canals of Great Britain
- History of the British canal system

== Bibliography ==
- Priestley, Joseph (1831). "Historical Account of the Navigable Rivers, Canals, and Railways of Great Britain". Archived from the original on 7 March 2016.
