= Hong Kong British =

Hong Kong British may refer to:

- Hong Kong people in the United Kingdom
- Britons in Hong Kong
- Hong Kong people included in the British Nationality Selection Scheme
- Hong Kong people with the status of British National (Overseas)

== See also ==
- British Hong Kong
- British nationality law and Hong Kong
- Hong Kong English
