= Politics of Hong Kong =

Politics of Hong Kong 香港特別行政區政府
- Emblem
- Constitution: Hong Kong Basic Law
- Formation: 1 July 1997; 29 years ago

Legislative branch
- Name: Legislative Council
- Meeting place: Legislative Council Complex

Executive branch
- Head of state and government
- Title: Chief Executive
- Appointer: Premier of China
- Cabinet
- Name: Executive Council
- Headquarters: Central Government Complex
- Ministries: 13 government agencies

Judicial branch
- Court of Final Appeal
- Seat: Court of Final Appeal Building

The politics of Hong Kong takes place in a framework of a political system dominated by its quasi-constitutional document, the Hong Kong Basic Law, its own legislature, the Chief Executive as the head of government and of the Special Administrative Region and of a politically constrained multi-party executive-led system. The Government of the Hong Kong Special Administrative Region of the People's Republic of China is led by the Chief Executive, the head of government.

The Basic Law, Hong Kong's constitutional document, was approved in March 1990 by National People's Congress of China, and entered into force on 1 July 1997, when sovereignty of Hong Kong was transferred to China (PRC), ending over one and a half centuries of British rule. Hong Kong became a Special Administrative Region (SAR) of the PRC with a high degree of autonomy in all matters except foreign affairs and defence, which are responsibilities of the PRC government. In accordance with Article 31 of the Constitution of China, Hong Kong's Special Administrative Region status provides constitutional guarantees for implementing the policy of "one country, two systems".

According to the Sino-British Joint Declaration (1984) and the Basic Law, Hong Kong was to retain its political, economic and judicial systems and unique way of life and continue to participate in international agreements and organisations as a dependent territory for at least 50 years after retrocession. For instance, the International Olympic Committee has recognised Hong Kong as a participating nation under the name, "Hong Kong, China", separate from the delegation from the People's Republic of China.

The Economist Intelligence Unit rated Hong Kong a "Hybrid regime" in 2023.

Since 2021, universal suffrage is only granted in elections for 20 out of 90 seats of the Legislative Council and 88 out of 470 seats of the district councils. The head of the government (Chief Executive of Hong Kong) is elected through an electoral college with the majority of its members elected by a limited number of voters mainly within business and professional sectors.

== Branches ==
=== Executive branch ===
The Chief Executive (CE) is the head of the special administrative region, and is also the highest-ranking official in the Government of Hong Kong Special Administrative Region, and is the head of the executive branch.

The Chief Executive is elected by a 1200-member Election Committee drawn mostly from the voters in the functional constituencies but also from religious organizations and municipal and central government bodies. The CE is legally appointed by the Premier of China. The Executive Council, the top policy organ of the executive government that advises on policy matters, is entirely appointed by the Chief Executive.

=== Legislative branch ===
In accordance with Article 26 of the Basic Law of the Hong Kong Special Administrative Region, permanent residents of Hong Kong are eligible to vote in direct elections for the 20 seats representing geographical constituencies. Some of the permanent residents who have specific occupational backgrounds are eligible to vote in the 30 seats from functional constituencies in the 90-seat, unicameral Legislative Council (LegCo).

Within functional constituencies, the franchise for the 30 seats is limited to about 230,000 voters in the other functional constituencies (mainly composed of business and professional sectors).

The 1,500-member election committee of Hong Kong will vote for the remaining 40 seats to enter the Legislative Council as the sector of Election Committee.

=== Judicial branch ===
The Judiciary consists of a series of courts, of which the court of final adjudication is the Hong Kong Court of Final Appeal.

While Hong Kong retains the common law system, the Standing Committee of the National People's Congress of China has the power of final interpretation of national laws affecting Hong Kong, including the Basic Law, and its opinions are therefore binding on Hong Kong courts on a prospective and often retrospective basis and may not be in line with common law principles.

== Transition, 1984-1997 ==
According to the Sino-British Joint Declaration (1984), Hong Kong was to retain its political, economic and judicial systems and unique way of life and continue to participate in international agreements and organizations as a dependent territory for at least 50 years after retrocession. The International Olympic Committee has recognized Hong Kong as a participating nation under the name, "Hong Kong, China", separate from the delegation from the People's Republic of China.

In March 1990, the National People's Congress of China approved the Basic Law, Hong Kong's constitutional document, which entered into force on 1 July 1997, when sovereignty of Hong Kong was transferred to China (PRC). This ended over one and a half centuries of British rule. Hong Kong became a Special Administrative Region (SAR) of the PRC with a high degree of autonomy in all matters except foreign affairs and defense, which are responsibilities of the PRC government. In accordance with Article 31 of the Constitution of China, Hong Kong's Special Administrative Region status provides constitutional guarantees for implementing the policy of "one country, two systems".

== Major political issues since 1997 ==
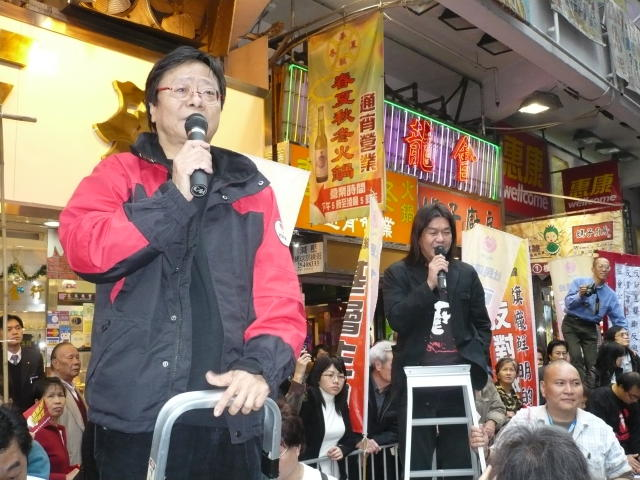
Political activists voicing their concern in the Jan 2008 protest

=== Right of abode, 1999 ===
On 29 January 1999, the Court of Final Appeal, the highest judicial authority in Hong Kong interpreted several Articles of the Basic Law, in such a way that the Government estimated would allow 1.6 million Mainland China immigrants to enter Hong Kong within ten years. This caused widespread concerns among the public on the social and economic consequences.

While some in the legal sector advocated that the National People's Congress (NPC) should be asked to amend the part of the Basic Law to redress the problem, the Government of Hong Kong (HKSAR) decided to seek an interpretation to, rather than an amendment of, the relevant Basic Law provisions from the Standing Committee of the National People's Congress (NPCSC). in June 1999, the NPCSC issued an interpretation in favour of the Hong Kong Government thereby overturning parts of the court decision. While the full powers of NPCSC to interpret the Basic Law was provided for in the Basic Law itself, some critics argued this undermined judicial independence.

=== 1 July 2003 marches and Article 23 ===
The Hong Kong 1 July March has been an annual protest rally led by the Civil Human Rights Front since the 1997 handover on the HKSAR establishment day. However, it was only in 2003 when it drew large public attention by opposing the bill of Article 23. It has become the annual platform for demanding universal suffrage, calling for observance and preservation of civil liberties such as free speech, venting dissatisfaction with the Hong Kong Government or the Chief Executive, rallying against actions of the Pro-Beijing camp.

In 2003, the HKSAR Government proposed to implement Article 23 of the Basic Law by enacting national security bill against acts such as treason, subversion, secession and sedition. However, there were concerns that the legislation would infringe upon human rights by introducing the mainland's concept of "national security" into the HKSAR. Together with the general dissatisfaction with the Tung administration, about 500,000 people participated in this protest. Article 23 enactment was "temporarily suspended".

=== Universal suffrage, 2003 - to date ===
Towards the end of 2003, the focus of political controversy shifted to the dispute of how subsequent Chief Executives get elected. The Basic Law's Article 45 stipulates that the ultimate goal is universal suffrage; when and how to achieve that goal, however, remains open but controversial. Under the Basic Law, electoral law could be amended to allow for this as soon as 2007 (Hong Kong Basic Law Annex .1, Sect.7). Arguments over this issue seemed to be responsible for a series of mainland Chinese newspapers commentaries in February 2004 which stated that power over Hong Kong was only fit for "patriots."

The interpretation of the NPCSC to Annex I and II of the Basic Law, promulgated on 6 April 2004, made it clear that the National People's Congress' support is required over proposals to amend the electoral system under Basic Law. On 26 April 2004, the Standing Committee of National People's Congress denied the possibility of universal suffrage in 2007 (for the Chief Executive) and 2008 (for LegCo).

The NPCSC interpretation and decision were regarded as obstacles to the democratic development of Hong Kong by the democratic camp, and were criticized for lack of consultation with Hong Kong residents. On the other hand, the pro-government camp considered them to be in compliance with the legislative intent of the Basic Law and in line with the 'One country, two systems' principle, and hoped that this would put an end to the controversies on development of political structure in Hong Kong.

Mid December 2007 Chief Executive Sir Donald Tsang requested that Beijing allow direct elections for the Chief Executive. He referred to a survey in which more than half of the citizens of Hong Kong wanted direct elections by 2012. However, he said waiting for 2017 may be the best way to get two-thirds of the support of Legislative Council. End of December Donald Tsang announced that the NPC said, it planned to allow the 2017 Chief Executive Elections and the 2020 Legislative Council elections to take place by universal suffrage.

In 2013, public concern was sparked that the election process for the Chief Executive would involve a screening process that selects for candidates deemed suitable for the position by Beijing, incited by a comment made by a Deputy of the National People's Congress at an off-the-record gathering.

=== Resignation of Tung Chee-hwa and interpretation of Basic Law, 2005 ===
On 12 March 2005, the Chief Executive, Tung Chee-hwa, resigned. Immediately after Tung's resignation, there was dispute over the length of the term of the Chief Executive. To most local legal professionals, the length is obviously five years, under whatever circumstances. It should also be noted that the wording of the Basic Law on the term of the Chief Executive is substantially different from the articles in the PRC constitution concerning the length of term of the president, premier, etc. Nonetheless, legal experts from the mainland said it is a convention a successor will only serve the remainder of the term if the position is vacant because the predecessor resigned. The Standing Committee of the National People's Congress affirmed that the successor would only serve the remainder of the term. Many in Hong Kong saw this as having an adverse impact on one country, two systems, as the Central People's Government interpret the Basic Law to serve its need, that is, a two-year probation for Tsang, instead of a five-year term.

=== Political reform package protests, 2005 ===
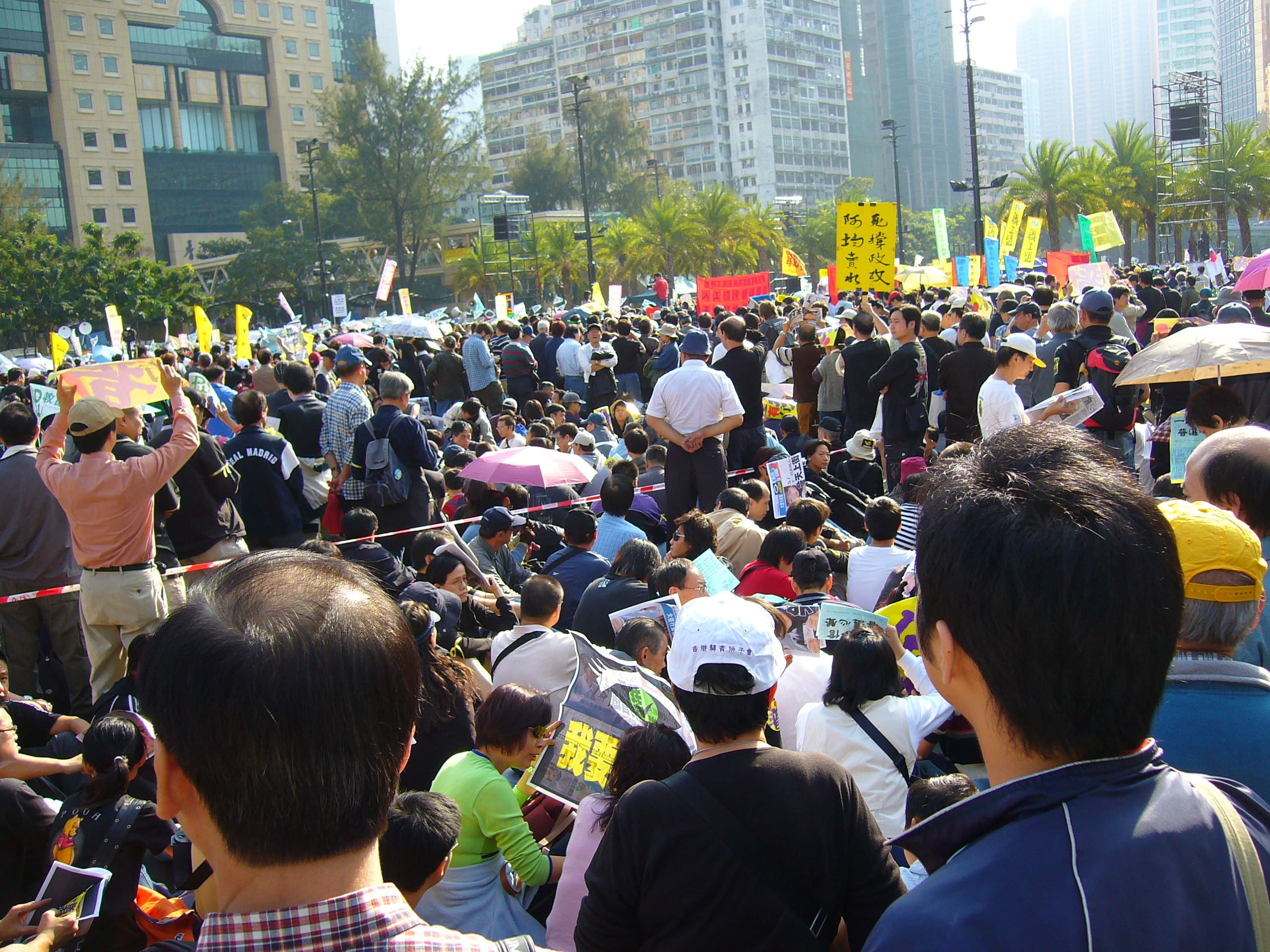
Demonstration against reform package

On 4 December 2005, people in Hong Kong demonstrated against Sir Donald Tsang's proposed reform package, before a vote on 21 December. According to the organizers, an estimated 250,000 turned out into the streets. The police supplied a figure of 63,000, and Michael de Golyer of Baptist University estimated between 70,000 and 100,000.

The march sent a strong message to hesitant pro-democracy legislators to follow public opinion. The pro-government camp claimed to have collected 700,000 signatures on a petition backing Tsang's reform package. This number, however, was widely seen as too small to influence pro-democracy lawmakers. The Reform Package debate saw the return of key political figure and former Chief Secretary Anson Chan, raising speculations of a possible run up for the 2007 Chief Executive election, though she dismissed having a personal interest in standing for the next election.

In an attempt to win last minute votes from moderate pro-democracy lawmakers, the government amended its reform package on 19 December 2005 by proposing a gradual cut in the number of district council members appointed by the Chief Executive. Their number was to be reduced from 102 to 68 by 2008. It was to be decided in 2011 whether to scrap the remaining seats in 2012 or in 2016. The amendment was seen as a reluctant response by Sir Donald Tsang to give satisfaction to the democratic demands made by demonstrators on 4 December. The move was qualified "Too little, too late" by pan-democrats in general.

On 21 December 2005, the political reform package was vetoed by pro-democracy lawmakers. Chief Secretary Rafael Hui openly criticized pro-democracy Martin Lee and Bishop Zen for blocking the proposed changes.

=== Political appointment system, 2008 ===
As of 2008, the 24 non-civil service positions under the political appointment system comprised 11 undersecretaries and 13 political assistants.

In May 2008, the government named eight newly appointed Undersecretaries and nine Political Assistants. The posts were newly created, ostensibly to work closely with bureau secretaries and top civil servants in implementing the Chief Executive's policy blueprint and agenda in an executive-led government. Donald Tsang described the appointments as a milestone in the development of Hong Kong's political appointment system. In June 2008 controversies arose with the disclosure of foreign passports and salaries. Pressure for disclosure continued to mount despite government insistence on the right of the individuals to privacy: on 10 June 2008, newly appointed Undersecretaries and political assistants, who had previously argued were contractually forbidden from disclosing their remuneration, revealed their salaries. The Government news release stated that the appointees had "voluntarily disclosed their salaries, given the sustained public interest in the issue."

=== Inflation relief measures, 2008 ===
On 16 July 2008, Donald Tsang announced some "extraordinary measures for extraordinary times", giving a total of HK$11 billion in inflation relief to help families' finances. Of which, the Employee Retraining levy on the employment of Foreign domestic helpers would be temporarily waived, at an estimated cost of $HK2 billion. It was intended that the levy would be waived for a two-year period on all helpers' employment contracts signed on or after 1 September 2008, but would not apply to ongoing contracts. The Immigration Department said it would not reimburse levies, which are prepaid half-yearly or yearly in advance. The announcement resulted in chaos and confusion, and uncertainty for the helpers as some employers deferred contracts or had dismissed helpers pending confirmation of the effective date, leaving helpers in limbo.

In July 2008, Secretary for Labor and Welfare Matthew Cheung announced the waiver commencement date would be brought forward by one month. The Immigration Department would relax its 14-day re-employment requirement for helpers whose contracts expired. On 30 July, the Executive Council approved the measures. After widespread criticism of the situation, the government also conceded that maids having advanced renewal of contract would not be required to leave Hong Kong through the discretion exercised by the Director of Immigration, and employers would benefit from the waiver simply by renewing the contract within the two-year period, admitting that some employers could benefit from the waiver for up to 4 years. The administration's poor handling of the matter was heavily criticized. The administrative credibility and competence were called into question by journals from all sides of the political spectrum, and by helpers and employers alike.

=== Leung Chin-man appointment, 2008 ===
In August 2008, the appointment of Leung Chin-man as deputy managing director and executive director of New World China Land, subsidiary of New World Development (NWD), was greeted with uproar amidst widespread public suspicion that job offer was a quid pro quo for the favors he allegedly granted to NWD. Leung was seen to have been involved with the sale of the Hung Hom Peninsula Home Ownership Scheme (HOS) public housing estate to NWD at under-value in 2004.

After a 12-month 'sterilization period' after retirement, Leung submitted an application to the government on 9 May for approval to take up employment with New World China Land. The Secretary for the Civil Service, Denise Yue Chung-yee, signed off on the approval for him to take up the job after his request passed through the vetting committee.

Controversies surrounded not only the suspicions of Leung's own conflict of interest, but also of the insensitivity of the committee which recommended the approval for him to take up his lucrative new job less than two years after his official retirement. New World argued that they hired Leung in good faith after government clearance.

On 15 August, the Civil Service Bureau issued the report requested by Donald Tsang, where they admitted that they had neglected to consider Leung's role in the Hung Hom Peninsula affair. Donald Tsang asked the SCS to reassess the approval, and submit a report to him. New World Development announced in the early hours of 16 August that Leung had resigned from his post, without any compensation from either side or from the government, for the termination.

The next day, Donald Tsang confirmed that Denise Yue would not have to resign. He was satisfied with her apology and with the explanations offered by her. Tsang ordered a committee, of which Yue was to be a member, to be set up to perform a sweeping review of the system to process applications for former civil servants.

=== May 2010 by-election ===
In January 2010, five pan-democrats resigned from the Legislative Council of Hong Kong to trigger a by-election in response to the lack of progress in the move towards universal suffrage.

They wanted to use the by-election as a de facto referendum for universal suffrage and the abolition of the functional constituencies.

=== Umbrella Revolution, 2014 ===
The Umbrella Revolution erupted spontaneously in September 2014 in protest of a decision by China's Standing Committee of the National People's Congress (NPCSC) on proposed electoral reform.

The austerity package provoked mobilization by students, and the effects became amplified into the Umbrella Movement a political movement involving hundreds of thousands of Hong Kong citizens provoking heavy-handed policing and government tactics.

=== Hong Kong Extradition bill, 2019 ===
In February 2019, the Legislative Council proposed a bill to amend extradition rights between Hong Kong and other countries. This bill was proposed because of an incident in which a Hong Kong citizen killed his pregnant girlfriend on vacation in Taiwan. However, there is no agreement to extradite to Taiwan, so he was unable to be charged in Taiwan. The bill proposed a mechanism for transfers of fugitives not only for Taiwan, but also for mainland China and Macau, which are not covered in the existing laws. The 2019–20 Hong Kong protests were a series of protests against the bill, such as on 9 June 2019 and 16 June 2019, which were estimated to number one million and two million protesters, respectively. Police brutality and subsequent further oppression of the protesters by the government have led to even more demonstrations, including the anniversary of the handover on 1 July 2019, which saw the storming of the Legislative Council Complex, and subsequent protests throughout the summer spreading to different districts.

On 15 June 2019, Chief Executive Carrie Lam decided to indefinitely suspend the bill in light of the protests, but also made it clear in her remarks that the bill was not withdrawn. On 4 September 2019, Lam announced that the government would "formally withdraw" the Fugitive Offenders Bill, as well as enacting a number of other reforms.

The 2019 Hong Kong District Council election was held on 24 November, the first poll since the beginning of the protests, and one that had been billed as a "referendum" on the government. More than 2.94 million votes were cast for a turnout rate of 71.2%, up from 1.45 million and 47% from the previous election. This was the highest turnout in Hong Kong's history, both in absolute numbers and in turnout rates. The results were a resounding landslide victory for the pro-democracy bloc, as they saw their seat share increased from 30% to almost 88%, with a jump in vote share from 40% to 57%. The largest party before the election, DAB, fell to third place, with its leader's vote share cut from a consistent 80% to 55%, and their three vice-chairs losing. Among those who were also legislators, the overwhelming majority of the losing candidates were from the pro-Beijing bloc. Commenting on the election results, New Statesman declared it "the day Hong Kong's true "silent majority" spoke.

After the election, the protests slowly became quiet due to the COVID-19 pandemic and government crackdown.

== Other political issues since 1997 ==
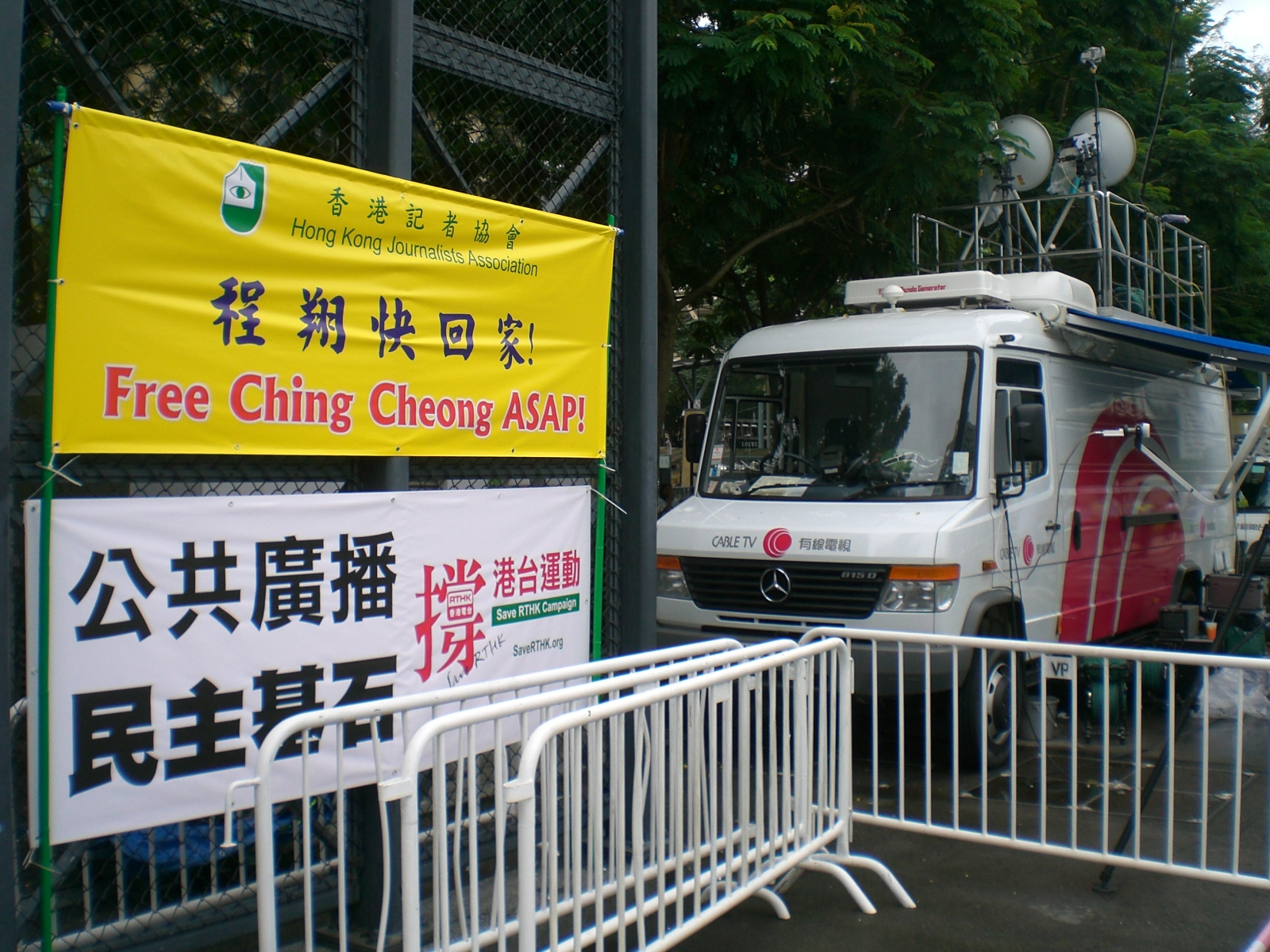
A "free Ching Cheong" poster

Year	Event
2001	The Grand Bauhinia Medal being bestowed on Yeung Kwong, a leader of the Hong Kong 1967 Leftist Riots.
2003	Central and Wan Chai Reclamation controversy Harbour Fest controversy
2005	Link REIT IPO controversy Arrest of journalist Ching Cheong by the People's Republic of China on spying charges Ma Ying-jeou denied visa to enter Hong Kong
2006	Aborted proposal to grant development rights for the West Kowloon Cultural District to a single developer. Aborted proposal to introduce a Goods and Services Tax; Battle for conservation of Star Ferry Pier
2007	Battle for conservation of Queen's Pier. Hong Kong Institute of Education academic freedom controversy
2009	Johannes Chan Macau ban Consultation Document on the Methods for Selecting the Chief Executive and for Forming the LegCo in 2012 launched
2010	2010 Hong Kong by-election Goddess of Democracy controversies
2012	Moral and National Education controversy
2014	Occupy movement expanded to Hong Kong
2016	Hong Kong Legislative Council oath-taking controversy
2017	2017 imprisonment of Hong Kong democracy activists
2019	2019–20 Hong Kong protests
2020	Beijing imposed National Security Law passed; Hong Kong pro-democracy activist Jimmy Lai arrested under new law, subsequently released
2021	Electoral System Changed and establishment of Candidate Eligibility Review Committee; Jimmy Lai was arrested again and sentenced to 5 years in prison for participating in a candlelight vigil honoring activists murdered during the Tiananmen Square massacre.
2024	Safeguarding National Security Ordinance passed with extraordinary speed, granting more powers to crack down on opposition to Beijing and the Hong Kong government

== Nationality and citizenship ==
=== Chinese nationality ===
Before and after the handover, the People's Republic of China has recognized ethnic Chinese people in Hong Kong as its citizens. The PRC issues Home Return Permits for them to enter mainland China. As of 2007, Hong Kong issued the HKSAR passport through its Immigration Department to all PRC citizens who were permanent residents of Hong Kong fitting the right of abode rule.

The HKSAR passport is not the same as the ordinary PRC passport, which is issued to residents of mainland China. Only permanent residents of Hong Kong who are PRC nationals are eligible to apply. To acquire the status of permanent resident one has to have "ordinarily resided" in Hong Kong for a period of seven years and adopted Hong Kong as their permanent home. Therefore, citizenship rights enjoyed by residents of mainland China and residents Hong Kong are differentiated even though both hold the same citizenship.

New immigrants from mainland China (who possess Chinese Citizenship) to Hong Kong are denied from getting a PRC passport from the mainland authorities, and are not eligible to apply for an HKSAR passport. They usually hold the Document of Identity (DI) as the travel document, until the permanent resident status is obtained after seven years of residence.

Naturalization as a PRC Citizen is common among ethnic Chinese people in Hong Kong who are not PRC Citizens. Some who have surrendered their PRC citizenship, usually those who have emigrated to foreign countries and have retained the permanent resident status, can apply for PRC citizenship at the Immigration Department, though they must renounce their original nationality in order to acquire the PRC citizenship.

Naturalization of persons that are not of Chinese ethnicity is rare. China does not allow dual citizenship and becoming a Chinese citizen requires the renouncement of other passports. An example is Michael Rowse, a permanent resident of Hong Kong and the current Director-General of Investment Promotion of Hong Kong Government, naturalized and became a PRC citizen, for the offices of secretaries of the policy bureaux are only open to PRC citizens.

In 2008, a row erupted over political appointees. Five newly appointed Undersecretaries declared that they were in the process of renouncing foreign citizenship as at 4 June 2008, citing public opinion as an overriding factor, and one Assistant had initiated the renunciation process. This was done despite there being no legal or constitutional barrier for officials at this level of government to have foreign nationality.

=== British nationality ===
Hong Kong residents who were born in Hong Kong in the British-administered era could acquire the British Dependent Territories citizenship. Hong Kong residents who were not born in Hong Kong could also naturalize as a British Dependent Territories Citizen (BDTC) before the handover. To allow them to retain the status of British national while preventing a possible flood of immigrants from Hong Kong, the United Kingdom created a new nationality status, British National (Overseas) that Hong Kong British Dependent Territories citizens could apply for. Holders of the British National (Overseas) passport - BN(O) - have no right of abode in the United Kingdom. See British nationality law and Hong Kong for details.

British National (Overseas) status was given effect by the Hong Kong (British Nationality) Order 1986. Article 4(1) of the Order provided that on and after 1 July 1987, there would be a new form of British nationality, the holders of which would be known as British Nationals (Overseas). Article 4(2) of the Order provided that adults and minors who had a connection to Hong Kong were entitled to make an application to become British Nationals (Overseas) by registration.

Becoming a British National (Overseas) was therefore not an automatic or involuntary process and indeed many eligible people who had the requisite connection with Hong Kong never applied to become British Nationals (Overseas). Acquisition of the new status had to be voluntary and therefore a conscious act. To make it involuntary or automatic would have been contrary to the assurances given to the Chinese government which led to the words "eligible to" being used in paragraph (a) of the United Kingdom Memorandum to the Sino-British Joint Declaration. The deadline for applications passed in 1997. Any person who failed to register as a British Nationals (Overseas) by 1 July 1997 and were eligible to become PRC citizens became solely PRC citizens on 1 July 1997. However, any person who would be rendered stateless by failure to register as a British Nationals (Overseas) automatically became a British Overseas citizen under article 6(1) of the Hong Kong (British Nationality) Order 1986.

After the Tiananmen Square protests of 1989, people urged the British Government to grant full British citizenship to all Hong Kong BDTCs – but this request was never accepted. However, it was considered necessary to devise a British Nationality Selection Scheme to enable some of the population to obtain British citizenship. The United Kingdom made provision to grant citizenship to 50,000 families whose presence was important to the future of Hong Kong under the British Nationality Act (Hong Kong) 1990.

After handover, all PRC citizens with the right of abode in Hong Kong (holding Hong Kong permanent identity cards) are eligible to apply for the HKSAR passport issued by the Hong Kong Immigration Department. As the visa-free-visit destinations of the HKSAR passport are very similar to that of a BN(O) passport and the application fee for the former is much lower (see articles HKSAR passport and British passport for comparison and verification), the HKSAR passport is becoming more popular among residents of Hong Kong.

Hong Kong residents who were not born in Hong Kong (and had not naturalized as a BDTC) could only apply for the Certificate of identity (CI) from the colonial government as travel document. They are not issued (by neither the British nor Chinese authorities) after handover. Former CI holders holding PRC Citizenship (e.g. born in mainland China or Macau) and are permanent residents of Hong Kong are now eligible for the HKSAR passports, making the HKSAR passports more popular.

== Political parties and elections ==
Hong Kong political parties in the pro-establishment camp support the policies of the PRC's central government and the Hong Kong Special Administrative Region government. Supporters of the pro-establishment camp generally have a strong sense of Chinese identity. As of at least 2024, the pro-establishment camp is the governing coalition in Hong Kong politics.

Political parties in the pan-democratic camp view the principle of One Country, Two Systems as standing for democracy in Hong Kong. They support universal suffrage. Supporters of the pan-democratic camp generally have a strong sense of Hong Kong identity.

=== Pro-establishment camp ===
- Democratic Alliance for the Betterment and Progress of Hong Kong (DAB) (Starry Lee, chair)
- Hong Kong Federation of Trade Unions (FTU) (Ng Chau-pei, president)
- Business and Professionals Alliance for Hong Kong (BPA) (Lo Wai-kwok, chair; Priscilla Leung, vice-chair)
- Liberal Party (Felix Chung, leader)
- New People's Party (NPP) (Regina Ip, chair)
- Roundtable (Michael Tien, Convenor)
- Professional Power (Christine Fong, chair)

=== Centrist ===
- Third Side (Tik Chi-yuen, chair)
- Path of Democracy (Ronny Tong, Convenor)

=== Pan-democratic camp ===
- Democratic Party (Lo Kin-hei, chair)
- Professional Commons (Paul Zimmerman, chair)
- Labour Party (Kwok Wing-kin, chair)
- League of Social Democrats (Chan Po-ying, chair)
- People Power (Leung Ka-shing, chair)
- Hong Kong First (Claudia Mo and Gary Fan, Leader)
- Association for Democracy and People's Livelihood (Bruce Liu, chair)

== Political pressure groups and leaders ==
- Chinese General Chamber of Commerce
- Chinese Manufacturers' Association of Hong Kong
- Hong Kong Confederation of Trade Unions (Lau Chin-shek, President; Lee Cheuk-yan, General Secretary)
- Federation of Hong Kong Industries
- Hong Kong Federation of Students (Pan-democracy camp)
- Scholarism (Against Chinese Moral and National education) (Pan-democracy camp)
- Civic Passion (Localist camp)
- Hong Kong Resurgence Order (Localist camp)
- Hong Kong Civile Party (Localism camp)
- Proletariat Political Institute (Localist camp)
- Hong Kong Indigenous (Localist camp)
- Hong Kong National Party (Localist camp)
- Hong Kong National Front (Localist camp)
- Hong Kong Localism Power (Localist camp)
- Hong Kong Civic Association
- International Action
- Hong Kong Federation of Trade Unions (Cheng Yiu-tong, President)
- Hong Kong Alliance in Support of Patriotic Democratic Movements of China
- Hong Kong and Kowloon Trade Union Council
- Hong Kong General Chamber of Commerce
- Hong Kong Professional Teachers' Union (PTU)

== See also ==
- Conservatism in Hong Kong
- District Councils of Hong Kong
- Foreign relations of Hong Kong
- Hong Kong independence
- Hong Kong–Mainland China conflict
- Hong Kong Watch
- Human rights in Hong Kong
- Liberalism in Hong Kong
- Localism in Hong Kong
- One country, two systems
- Police state
- Politics of China
- Principal Officials Accountability System
- Pro-Taiwan camp (Hong Kong)
- Socialism in Hong Kong
- United front in Hong Kong
