= Hongkongers in Britain (association) =

Hong Kong expatriate group founded by former British Consulate worker Simon Cheng

- 英國港僑協會
- Formation: 7 July 2020; 6 years ago
- Founder: Simon Cheng; Julian Chan
- Founded at: United Kingdom
- Tax ID no.: 12726075
- Headquarters: 1 Coral St, Waterloo, London SE1 7BE
- Members: 25,000
- Official language: Cantonese, English
- Website: www.hongkongers.org.uk

Hongkongers in Britain (Chinese: 英國港僑協會, HKB) is a Hongkonger expatriate association based in the United Kingdom that was established to unite the people of Hong Kong in the UK, and build an alliance with the international Hongkongers community. It was founded by a group of pro-democracy Hongkongers and activists including former British consulate officer Simon Cheng.

The group aims to offer a platform for Hongkongers to support each other, such as advising on setting up businesses, enabling them to rebuild their lives in the UK and nurture a community spirit. It also calls for expansion of the rights of British National (Overseas) passport holders through lobbying with the government, while promoting the Hong Kong culture in Britain.

== BN(O) schemes ==
Following the introduction of the national security law by China in Hong Kong in June 2020, British Government announced new route for British National (Overseas), or BN(O), passport holders and their dependent family members to apply for renewable five-year residence visas, eventually to gain the right of abode, starting from January 2021. Prior to that in December 2020, Hongkongers in Britain issued a policy study which found 90% of those considering to migrate to UK were as a result of the new security law. The association submitted the report to the Home Office for further consideration.

As the visa scheme began, Hongkongers in Britain hosted seminars for prospective applicants. It also vowed to work closely with the British governments, local authorities, and community organisations over the BN(O) scheme.

During the 2021 United Kingdom census, HKB called on Hongkongers to report themselves as "Hongkonger", instead of Chinese, for the government to understand the distribution of Hongkongers across the country.

=== Expansion of scheme ===
Hongkongers in Britain has received reports of difficulties from some BN(O)s in proving their right to work during job interviews. In some cases, employers are uncertain about the stamps for the LOTR status and they request a written proof issued by the Home Office to confirm the right to work. On 2 December 2020, Hongkongers in Britain sent a letter to the Home Secretary to ask for further clarification and actions to avail the information to British employers, such as specifying the rights coming with the LOTR stamp or issuing an official letter to relieve the doubts of the employers and the general public.

In regards to financial difficulties where grassroot families cannot afford the BN(O) fees in one go, HKB suggested the Home Office to review on case-by-case basis, while three shadow ministers Stephen Kinnock, Holly Lynch, and Steve Reed also sent a letter to Ministry of Housing, Communities and Local Government, warning the visa route would only be available "for the rich" unless the government reduces financial barriers. Eventually in March 2021, the Home Office changed rules to allow those in difficult condition to access public funds on a case-by-case basis.

== See also ==
- British nationality law and Hong Kong
- British Chinese
- British National (Overseas)
- East Asians in the United Kingdom
- Demographics of Hong Kong
- Handover of Hong Kong
- Britons in Hong Kong
- Hong Kong people in the United Kingdom
