= Hong Kongers in the United Kingdom =

Ethnic group

Hong Kongers in the UK
Total population
- Hong Kong-born residents in the United Kingdom: 135,312 – 0.2% (2021/22 Census) (Note: Does not include Hong Kongers born in the United Kingdom, Mainland China (mainly Guangdong Province) or elsewhere); England: 117,714 – 0.2% (2021); Scotland: 11,901 – 0.2% (2022); Wales: 3,715 – 0.1% (2021); Northern Ireland: 1,982 – 0.1% (2021); Other estimates: est. 280,000 – accounting for BN(O) arrivals (2024); Hong Kong citizens/passports held: 19,489 (England and Wales only, 2021)

Languages
- English (British English, Hong Kong English), Standard Chinese, Hong Kong Cantonese, Hakka

Religion
- Atheism, Christianity, Buddhism, Taoism

Related ethnic groups
- British Chinese, Britons in Hong Kong

Hong Kongers in the United Kingdom (also known as Hong Kong Britons) are people from Hong Kong who are residing in the United Kingdom or British nationals of Hong Kong origin or descent.

The 2021 United Kingdom census recorded a total population of about 135,300 Hong Kong-born residents. Since the implementation of the British National (Overseas) visa route in the same year, 144,400 BN(O) status holders from Hong Kong have arrived in the United Kingdom.

== Background ==
The United Kingdom has historically been a popular destination for Hong Kong immigrants due to the colonial relationship between the two territories. The British Nationality Act 1948 allowed Hong Kong-born residents to move to the UK free of restriction. The UK's popularity among Hong Kong immigrants was also helped by the fact that the English language enjoys official status in both territories. While many Hong Kong-born residents of the UK are ethnically Chinese, others include the children of colonial parentage (British and/or other European heritage, and people with ancestries from other parts of the former British colonial empire) born in Hong Kong prior to the transfer of sovereignty to China in 1997.

In July 2020, following the implementation of new national security laws in Hong Kong by the mainland China government, the UK offered a pathway to citizenship for British Nationals (Overseas) status holders in Hong Kong. In the first year of the policy, 103,900 people applied for the BN(O) visa, which had almost doubled to 191,000 by January 2024.

== Demographics ==
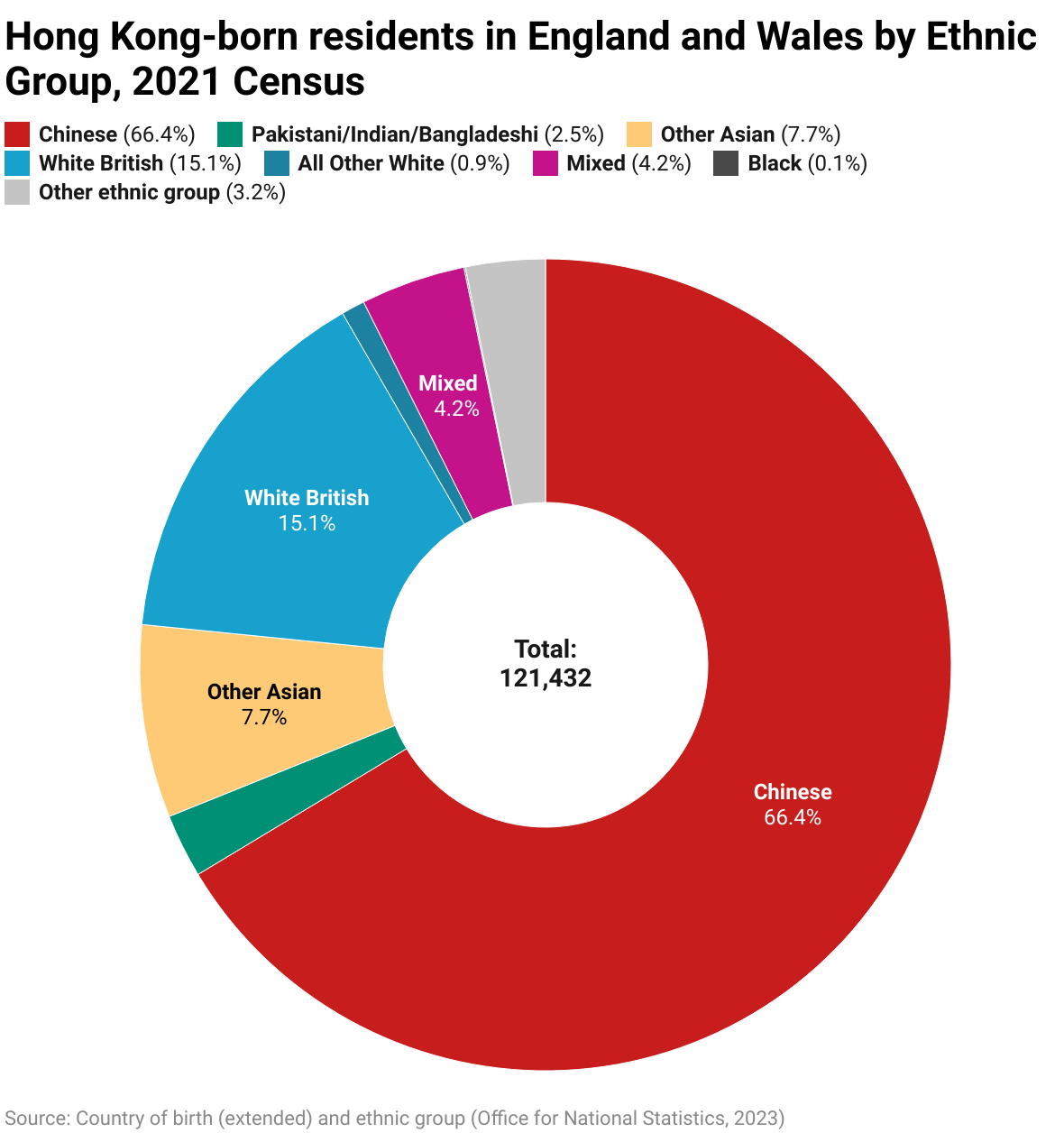
Hong Kong-born residents by ethnic group (2021 census, England and Wales)

The 2001 census recorded 96,445 Hong Kong-born people residing in the United Kingdom. The 2011 census recorded 98,724 Hong Kong-born people resident in England, 3,517 in Wales, 7,586 in Scotland and 1,906 in Northern Ireland. The figure in Scotland was 7,068 in 2001 and 5,910 in 1991. The 2021 census recorded 117,714 Hong Kong-born people resident in England, 11,901 in Scotland, 3,715 in Wales and 1,982 in Northern Ireland. The 2021 census was conducted less than two months after the implementation of the new BN(O) visa scheme in January 2021 so there is a likelihood that few of its beneficiaries had been recorded by the census. Figures from the Home Office in January 2024 showed that over 144,000 Hong Kongers have moved to the UK since the start of 2021, more than doubling the size of the community.

Hong Kongers who migrated to the UK under the BN(O) visa scheme introduced in 2021 were predominately in their 30s and 40s, 70% were graduates and 39% had a professional occupational background. According to The Economist, reasons for this demographic include the fact that only people born before 1997 are eligible for British National (Overseas) status, and that families with children are particularly eager to emigrate from Hong Kong following the introduction of the territory's national security law. BN(O) arrivals tended to move to affordable areas and suburbs outside of London that had a strong schooling system, with popular destinations named as Salford, Trafford, Warrington, Solihull and Sutton.

== Politics ==
Civil society groups have been set up to increase voter registration and to tackle issues affecting the community for the 100,000–140,000 BN(O) arrivals expected to be eligible to vote. A survey conducted at the end of 2022 by the University of Liverpool on Hong Kongers who came to the UK through the BN(O) visa pathway suggested that more than half of the new arrivals would vote Conservatives, 16 per cent for the Liberal Democrats and 14 per cent for Labour. Amongst the Chinese ethnic group in general, another survey conducted in 2023 found that Conservatives (40 per cent) led Labour (37 per cent) by 3 points.

== Community ==
Hong Kong migrants under the BN(O) visa pathway to citizenship have created several self-help organisations, including Hongkongers in Britain and the Sutton Hongkongers Group, to support and advocate for each other since the pathway was introduced. Many of these organisations were set up because new Hong Kong migrants often fear recently established Chinese community groups that are aligned with the government in Beijing.

== Transnational repression ==
Hong Kongers in the UK have faced targeting by secretive overseas police stations run by the Chinese government, including allegations of stalking and harassment and the targeting of family members who remained in China.

In December 2024, a number of former pro-democracy activists in Hong Kong who had since moved to Britain had bounties placed on them.

== Notable people ==
- Lydia Dunn, Baroness Dunn
- Alan Mak, Conservative Member of Parliament
- Sir David Tang, businessman
- Bob's Your Uncle, YouTube personality
- Gemma Chan, actress
- Angela Hui, journalist and author
- Jenny Lau, writer and community organiser
- Katie Leung, actress
- Herman Li, guitarist for DragonForce
- Anna Lo, former politician
- Gok Wan, fashion consultant and television presenter
- Benedict Wong, actor
- Tom Wu, actor
- Isobel Yeung, journalist
- Nathan Law, HK protest leader
- Nat Wei, Baron Wei

== See also ==
- British Hong Kong (1841–1997)
- Hong Kong–United Kingdom relations
- China–United Kingdom relations
- Emigration from Hong Kong
