= Hongkongers =

Cultural identity of Hong Kong people

- Chinese: 香港人
Transcriptions
Standard Mandarin
- Hanyu Pinyin: Xiānggǎng rén
- IPA: [ɕjáŋ.kàŋ.ɻə̌n]
Hakka
- Romanization: hiong^{1} gong^{3} ngin^{2}
Yue: Cantonese
- Yale Romanization: Hèunggóng Yàhn
- Jyutping: Hoeng1gong2 jan4
- IPA: [hœŋ˥.kɔŋ˧˥.jɐn˩]

Hongkongers (Chinese: 香港人; Jyutping: Hoeng1gong2 jan4), Hong Kongers, Hong Kong citizens (Note: Formally, the government of Hong Kong does not confer "citizenship". The term Hong Kong citizen is a colloquialism used to denote a permanent resident of Hong Kong. Permanent residents of Hong Kong typically hold citizenship from China or another sovereign state.) and Hong Kong people are demonyms that refer to a resident or native inhabitants of Hong Kong, such as the Punti and Tanka, although they may also refer to others who were born and/or raised in the territory.

Prior to British colonization, the Hong Kong population were overwhelmingly native inhabitants. During British rule, the Greater China identity, shaped by Chinese cultural heritage, were observed in the events such as the 1920s Canton–Hong Kong strike. The 1967 riots and the 1989 Tiananmen Square massacre caused shifts of the Hong Kong identity towards anti-communism, giving rise to localism.

Legally and technically speaking, the term Hongkonger generally refers to a resident of Hong Kong after the 1997 handover of Hong Kong. However, overseas Hong Kong population or their descendants may culturally self-identify as Hongkongers.

== Terminology ==
The terms Hongkonger and Hong Kongese are used to denote "a native or inhabitant of Hong Kong". According to the Oxford English Dictionary, the word Hongkonger first appeared in the English language in an 1870 edition of The Daily Independent, an American-based newspaper. In March 2014, both the terms Hongkonger and Hong Kongese were added to the Oxford English Dictionary. In contrast, the Merriam-Webster Dictionary of American English adopts the form Hong Konger instead. The form Hong Konger also seems to be preferred by governments around the world. In 2008, the U.S. Government Publishing Office decided to include Hong Konger as a demonym for Hong Kong in its official Style Manual. The Companies House of the UK government similarly added Hong Konger to its standard list of nationalities in September 2020. The aforementioned terms all translate to the same term in Cantonese, 香港人 (Cantonese Yale: Hèung Góng Yàhn; lit. 'Hong Kong person').

During the British colonial era, terms like Hong Kong Chinese and Hong Kong Britons were used to distinguish the British and Chinese populations that lived in the territory.

=== Technicality and Legal Status ===
The term Hongkonger generally refers to a legal resident of Hong Kong, as defined under Article 24 of the Hong Kong Basic Law. Residents are holders of Hong Kong Identity Cards, classified as permanent or non-permanent residents. The right of abode may be acquired through birth in Hong Kong or other routes, including family reunification through a one-way permit for eligible mainland Chinese residents. Formally speaking, the government of Hong Kong does not confer its own citizenship, although the term Hong Kong citizen is used colloquially to refer to permanent residents of the city. Permanent residency does not require a language or civic test, while Cantonese proficiency and knowledge of local customs may be considered at the discretion of authorities in applications for Chinese nationality through naturalisation.

== Ethnicity and Background ==
According to Hong Kong's 2021 census, 91.6 per cent of its population is Hongkongers and Chinese, with 29.9 per cent having been born in mainland China, Taiwan or Macau. Historically, much of the Han Chinese trace their ancestral origins from Southern China as Chaoshan, Canton, Taishan, Fujian, Jiangxi, and Zhejiang. For example, in the 1850s–60s as a result of the Taiping Rebellion and in the 1940s prior to the establishment of the People's Republic of China in 1949. Thus, immigrants from Guangdong and their descendants have long constituted the majority of the ethnic Chinese residents of Hong Kong, which accounts for the city's broad Cantonese culture. The Cantonese language, a form of Yue Chinese, is the primary language of Hong Kong and that used in the media and education. For that reason, while there are groups with ancestral roots in more distant parts of China, such as Shanghai and Shandong, as well as members of other Han Chinese subgroups, such as the Hakka, Hokkien, and Teochew, residents who are Hong Kong-born and/or raised often assimilate into the mainstream Cantonese identity of Hong Kong and typically adopt Cantonese as their first language. Cantonese continues to remain the dominant language, spoken by 93.7% of the population in 2021. However, Mandarin has become increasingly important in daily life, with more residents speaking it due to growing ties with the Mainland. This change in linguistic trends is shaping the territory's cultural future and its role within the greater Chinese-speaking world.

Simultaneously, there has been an increase in the number of new immigrants from mainland China, influencing both demographic composition and linguistic trends in the territory. From late 2022, Hong Kong expanded its talent admission programmes in response to labour shortages. By February 2026, these schemes had admitted more than 530,000 people, including dependants. Around 300,000 of the more than 410,000 applications approved over the preceding three years came from mainland China. At the same time Mainland China holds the largest number of Hong Kong residents outside of Hong Kong.

=== Ethnic Minorities ===
In addition to the Chinese supermajority, Hong Kong's minority population also comprises many other different ethnic and national groups, with the largest non-Chinese groups being the Southeast Asian communities which include the Filipinos (2.7 per cent), Indonesians (1.9 per cent), as well as the Thais and Vietnamese. In 2021, 0.8 per cent of Hong Kong's population were of European ancestry, many (48.9 per cent) of whom resided on Hong Kong Island, where they constitute 2.5 per cent of the population. There are long-established South Asian communities, which comprise both descendants of 19th and early 20th-century migrants as well as more recent short-term expatriates. There are small pockets of South Asian communities who live in Hong Kong including Indians, Nepalese, and Pakistanis, who respectively made up 0.6 per cent, 0.4 per cent, and 0.3 per cent of Hong Kong's population in 2021. Smaller diaspora groups from the Anglosphere include Americans, Britons, Canadians, Australians, New Zealanders. There are also small pockets of East Asian communities, such as the Japanese and Koreans, living in Hong Kong.

Hong Kong population by ancestral origin (1961–1981)
Ancestry	1961		1971		1981	
Ancestry	Number	Percentage	Number	Percentage	Number	Percentage
Hong Kong	260,505	8.3	185,699	4.7	124,279	2.5
Guangzhou and Macau	1,521,715	48.6	2,072,083	52.6	2,455,749	49.2
Sze Yap	573,855	18.3	684,774	17.4	814,309	16.3
Chaozhou	257,319	8.2	391,454	9.9	566,044	11.4
Other parts of Guangdong	244,237	7.8	250,215	6.4	470,288	9.4
Fujian, Taiwan, Jiangsu, Zhejiang	178,626	5.7	235,872	6.0	351,454	7.0
Other parts of China	43,644	1.4	48,921	1.2	103,531	2.1
Foreigners	49,747	1.6	67,612	1.7	100,906	2.0
Total	3,129,648		3,936,630		4,986,560	

- Hong Kong includes: Indigenous inhabitants of the New Territories, Tanka people, Hakka people
- Guangzhou and Macau includes: Humen, Cixi, Zhongshan, Hua County, Wanshan Archipelago, Nanhai, Bao'an County, Panyu, Sanshui, Shenzhen, Shilong Shunde, Dapeng, Zengcheng, Conghua, Dongguan, Huiyang
- Sze Yap includes: Kaiping, Heshan, Jiangmen, Xinhui, Taishan, Enping
- Chaozhou includes: Shantou, Chenghai, Chao'an, Chaoyang, Fengshun, Jieyang, Nan'ao District, Nanshan, Puning, Huilai, Raoping
- Other places in Guangdong include: Hainan administrative region and other places.

== Cultural Identity ==
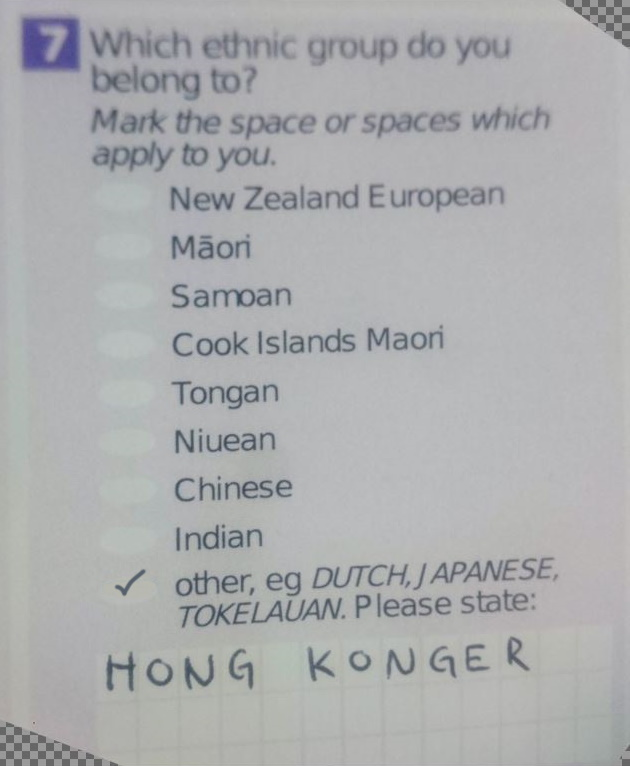
"Hongkonger ethnic group" is manually written in the questionnaire of the 2018 New Zealand census.

Hong Kong culture is primarily a mix of Chinese and Western influences, stemming from Lingnan Cantonese roots and later fusing with British culture due to British colonialism (Chinese: 粵英薈萃; Jyutping: jyut6 jing1 wui6 seoi6).

From 26 January 1841 to 30 June 1997, Hong Kong was formally a British crown colony and later a British dependent territory, (Note: From the 19th century to 1983, British Dependent Territories were referred to as Crown Colonies. Several years after the handover of Hong Kong, British Dependent Territories were renamed British Overseas Territories.) except for a brief period of Japanese occupation during World War II between 1941 and 1945. English was introduced as an official language of Hong Kong during British colonial rule alongside the indigenous Chinese language, notably Cantonese. While it was an overseas territory, Hong Kong participated in a variety of organisations from the Commonwealth Family network. Hong Kong ended its participation with most Commonwealth Family organisations after the handover of Hong Kong in 1997; although it still participates in the Association of Commonwealth Universities and the Commonwealth Lawyers Association. Moreover, Hong Kong also has indigenous people and ethnic minorities from South and Southeast Asia, whose cultures all play integral parts in modern-day Hong Kong culture. As a result, after the 1997 transfer of sovereignty to the People's Republic of China, Hong Kong has continued to develop a unique identity under the rubric of One Country Two Systems. Nonetheless, the historical memories and legacies related to legal frameworks and schooling systems, as well as the privileged status of the English language as a cultural and symbolic capital, complicate Chinese national identity despite the return of sovereignty.

After the handover of Hong Kong, the University of Hong Kong surveyed Hong Kong residents about how they defined themselves. The number of Hong Kong residents identifying as "Hong Kongers" slowly increased over the decade of the 2010s, reaching a high watermark during and immediately following the 2019–2020 Hong Kong protests, with over 55 percent of all respondents identifying as "Hong Konger" in a poll conducted in December 2019, with the most notable spike occurring amongst younger residents. Following the passage of the 2020 Hong Kong National Security Law and a subsequent wave of emigrants from Hong Kong, that percentage has declined; in its latest poll published in June 2022, 39.1% of respondents identified as Hong Konger, 31.4% as Hong Konger in China, 17.6% as Chinese, 10.9% as Chinese in Hong Kong, and 42.4% as mixed identity.

== Diaspora ==
Apart from mainland China, where the largest number of Hongkongers are found outside the territory, the Hong Kong diaspora can be found in Taiwan and several English-speaking countries such as Canada, the United Kingdom, and the United States. Most Hongkongers living outside of Greater China form a part of the larger overseas Chinese community. Waves of the migration of Hongkongers to other parts of the world took place following the Sino-British Joint Declaration in 1984, following 1989, and in the years prior to the territory's transfer to China in 1997, though a significant percentage returned in the years following. A new emigration wave occurred following the 2019–2020 Hong Kong protests and the United Kingdom's enactment of the BN(O) visa scheme.

Since 2021, more than 170,000 Hongkongers have moved to the United Kingdom under the British National (Overseas) visa scheme.

== See Also ==
- Bilingualism in Hong Kong
- British National (Overseas)
- Hong Kong returnee
- New immigrants in Hong Kong
- Waves of mass migrations from Hong Kong
- British nationality law and Hong Kong

=== Culture ===
- Code-switching in Hong Kong
- Culture of Hong Kong
- Hong Kong drifter
- Hong Kong Kids phenomenon
- Hong Kong name
- Hong Kong returnee
- Indigenous inhabitants of the New Territories
- Lion Rock Spirit
- Religion in Hong Kong
- Youth in Hong Kong
