= Hong Kong returnee =

A Hong Kong returnee is a resident of Hong Kong who emigrated to another country, lived for an extended period of time in their adopted home, and then subsequently moved back to Hong Kong.

== Population ==
According to the Hong Kong Transition Project of Hong Kong Baptist University, in 2002, Hong Kong returnees constituted 3% of the Hong Kong population. This number was arrived at by survey and a participant was categorised as a "returnee" by self-identification. As such, it excluded those Hong Kongers surveyed who had foreign citizenship, but did not self-identify as "returnees".

== Emigration ==
Most returnees left Hong Kong during the 1980s and the 1990s leading up to the handover of Hong Kong back to China. According to Matthew Cheung, Secretary for Labour and Welfare, approximately 600,000 people emigrated before and around 1997. The destination of choice was usually a Western country, the most popular being Canada, Australia, and the United States.

There are typically two types of emigrants, those who planned on returning to Hong Kong after they obtained foreign citizenship and those who planned on staying in their adopted homes permanently and fully adapting to life there. The former are sometimes better described as sojourners rather than emigrants. However, often these two types of Hong Kong emigrants act against what they had planned, where some of those who had planned on permanent stays actually returned to Hong Kong, some planning on temporary stays actually made the decision to stay permanently in their adopted homelands.

== Remigration ==
It is estimated that 30% of those Hong Kongers who moved away in the 1980s have returned to Hong Kong. Those that have moved back to Hong Kong have returned for various reasons – for economic reasons, or simply because they enjoy living in Hong Kong more than they do elsewhere. Specifically, many wealthy Hong Kongers who emigrated to Canada found that they could not adjust to the economic culture in Canada. The higher taxes, red tape, and the language contributed to the barrier of entry for businesses in Canada. Comparatively speaking, doing business in Hong Kong was much easier.

The movement of people is not a permanent remigration as returnees could go back to their adopted country at any stage, especially if they gained its citizenship. Plans to return to their adopted homeland could be influenced by political or personal reasons.

== Social consequences ==
=== Cultural identity ===
Issues of identity have sometimes arisen for returnees, especially amongst those returnees that left Hong Kong when they were children, because of the change in national identity of Hong Kong the city itself due to Hong Kong returning to Chinese rule, and because of the life experiences gained living in their previously adopted homes outside of Hong Kong.

=== "Astronauts" ===
Many of those who returned to Hong Kong were husbands who left their entire families in their adopted homes, while they worked in Hong Kong. These husbands were dubbed Taai Hung Yahn (Chinese: 太空人; Cantonese Yale: taai hùng yàhn), or "astronauts" because they spend their lives flying back and forth between Hong Kong and the adopted homes of their families.

Taai Hung Yahn is also a play on words. Taking a more literal meaning of the Chinese characters for "astronaut", Taai Hung Yahn (太空人) can translate loosely to "man without a wife".

== See also ==
- Hongkongers
- Yacht people
- Migration in China
- Overseas Chinese
- China–United Kingdom relations
- Sino-British Joint Declaration
- Third culture kid
- Emigration from Hong Kong
