= Malvern College Hong Kong =

International school in Hong Kong

- 香港墨爾文國際學校
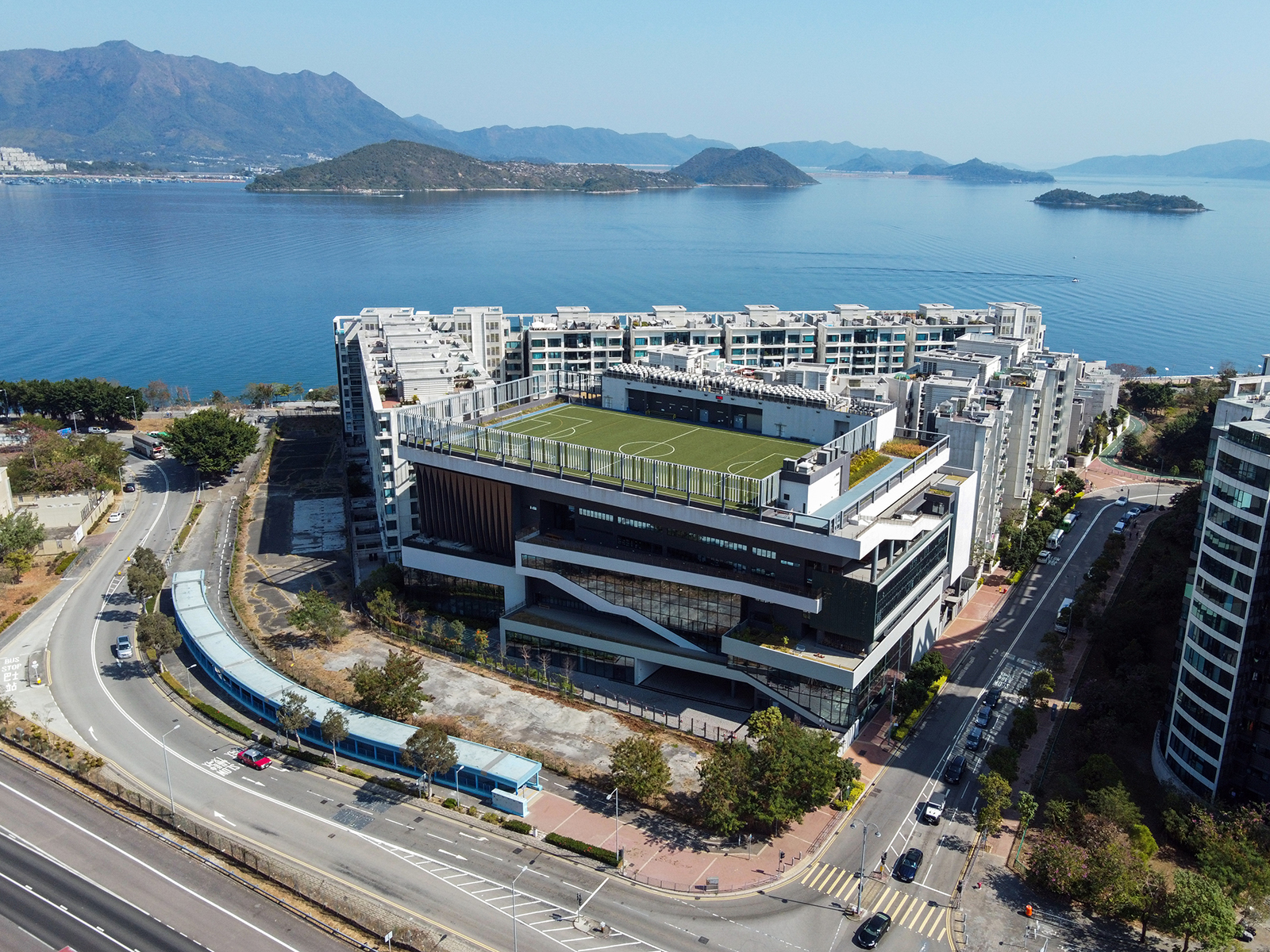
- The school premises

Location
- Fo Chun Road; Pak Shek Kok, Tai Po, New Territories; Hong Kong; 22.4330733°N 114.20161370000005°E

Information
- Type: International school, day school
- Motto: Sapiens qui prospicit (Wise is the person who looks ahead)
- Established: 27 August 2018
- Headmaster: Mr Edward Wright
- Gender: Coeducational
- Age: 5 to 18
- Enrolment: 1200
- Alumni: Old Malvernians
- Website: http://www.malverncollege.edu.hk/

Malvern College Hong Kong
- Traditional Chinese: 香港墨爾文國際學校
- Simplified Chinese: 香港墨尔文国际学校
Transcriptions
Standard Mandarin
- Hanyu Pinyin: Xiānggǎng Mòěrwén Guójì Xuéxiào
Yue: Cantonese
- Jyutping: hoeng1 gong2 mak6 ji5 man4 gwok3 zai3 hok6 haau6

Malvern College Hong Kong (Chinese: 香港墨爾文國際學校) is a private British international school in Pak Shek Kok, Hong Kong. The school officially opened on August 27, 2018 and provides for around 1,200 students at primary and secondary levels. The school is an affiliate of Malvern College in Malvern, Worcestershire, United Kingdom.

In 2026, Edward Wright was appointed as the school's third headmaster. He replaced Paul Wicks who served as headmaster for three years.

The college's affiliated preschool and kindergarten, Malvern College Pre-School Hong Kong is located at Coronation Circle in West Kowloon.

== Curriculum ==
The school adopts the International Baccalaureate curriculum, with classes from Year 1 to Year 13.

== School uniform ==
The school uses a British school uniform, with adjustments to fit the Hong Kong weather: short sleeve shirts, a different sports kit, and a lack of requirement of jackets. Former headmaster Robin A Lister stated that the uniform's "Britishness" is a key element.

== Facilities ==
The school campus, of reinforced concrete structure in constructivist style, was designed by Palmer & Turner Group, constructed by BuildKing Holdings and completed in 2018. The school features a rooftop football pitch, a continuous interweaving staircase, vertical greenery and multiple sky terraces.

The school houses a swimming pool, a 450-seated auditorium, two indoor gymnasiums, and a library with bookshelves arranged in the format of an amphitheatre.

The school campus was the first international school in Hong Kong being awarded the Leading Energy and Environmental Design (LEED) Gold Certification from the US Green Building Council. The campus also received Quality Building Award 2020 Hong Kong Non-Residential (New Building – Government, Institution or Community) Merit Award.

== See also ==
- Britons in Hong Kong
- Consulate General of the United Kingdom in Hong Kong
