= Emigration from Hong Kong =

Reasons for emigration from Hong Kong range from livelihood hardships, such as the high cost of living and educational pressures, to economic opportunities elsewhere, such as expanded opportunities in mainland China following the reform and opening up, to various political events, such as the Japanese invasion of Hong Kong during the Second World War, the 1967 unrest, uncertainties leading up to the 1997 handover, and the 2019–2020 unrest. The largest community of Hong Kongers living outside of Hong Kong is in Mainland China, followed by the United States, Canada and the UK.

== History ==
=== Japanese occupation ===
Governor Mark Aitchison Young surrendered British Hong Kong to the Empire of Japan on 25 December 1941 after Allied forces were defeated by the invading Japanese military. The ensuing occupation lasted for three years and eight months until the surrender of Japan in August 1945, which marked the end of World War II in Asia. As a result of the Japanese occupation, the population of Hong Kong dwindled from 1.6 million in 1941 to 600,000 in 1945.

=== Post-WWII to 1960s unrest ===
While post-WWII Hong Kong saw a population boom with increased migration from mainland China, the traditional ways of life in the indigenous villages in the New Territories collapsed. Unable to earn a living in the newly industrialised economy of post-war Hong Kong, many villagers exercised their right of abode in the United Kingdom and left for Europe.

Throughout the 1960s, local discontent and labour movements against British colonial rule led to growing unrest, exemplified by the 1966 and 1967 riots. This pushed some Hong Kong residents to move abroad to various countries in Southeast Asia, South Africa and South America. This wave did not come to a rest until the mid-1970s.

=== Lead-up to handover ===
On 19 December 1984, the People's Republic of China and the United Kingdom signed the Sino-British Joint Declaration, and validated the 1997 handover of Hong Kong back to China. Political uncertainties leading up to this transfer of sovereignty, including the 1989 Tiananmen Square protests and massacre in Beijing, prompted some Hong Kong residents to migrate in the 1980s–90s.

The British government made it clear that Hong Kong subjects would not be granted British citizenship on the grounds that they were residing in a British colony, so migrants made their own arrangements. Cities such as Vancouver, Toronto, Sydney, Melbourne and London were popular destinations, and an estimated US$4.2 billion entered Canada as a result. Peak outflows between 1988 and 1994 averaged about 55,000 per year, although many returned to Hong Kong in the early years following the handover.

=== Post-handover and reverse migration ===
After the handover, a significant portion of Hong Kong-born emigrants to foreign countries returned to Hong Kong in a wave of return migration known as the "Hong Kong returning tide" (Chinese: 香港回流潮). Statistics indicate that 35% of people who emigrated from Hong Kong since the 1980s ultimately returned to the city.

==== Migration to mainland China ====
In the years following the reform and opening up, a growing number of Hongkongers have migrated to mainland China, in what is known as the "heading north" (北上) phenomenon.

==== Social issues and 2019–2020 unrest ====
Social inequality and the high cost of living accelerated throughout the 2010s. This, coupled with the increasingly hostile stance from the Hong Kong government to universal suffrage and political expression, further increased the sentiment to migrate from Hong Kong. A key milestone would be the first occasion of tear gassing of peaceful protestors in decades, which at the time was directed by Chief Executive Leung Chun-ying, sparking backlash from the public and precipitated the Umbrella Movement. Government further exacerbated the political climate, notably the mass protests that erupted in 2019 in response to proposed extradition amendments by the Carrie Lam administration, which began as peaceful demonstration and protests but later escalated. The central Chinese government then enacted the Hong Kong national security law to enlarge the power of the police to arrest and detain.

These events have pushed some residents to leave Hong Kong, including opposition activists fleeing arrest. Both Australia and Canada widened permanent residency pathways for students, skilled workers and asylum seekers from Hong Kong.

==== Expanded access to UK citizenship ====
In January 2021, the United Kingdom took significant measures in response to the exodus by announcing a pathway to citizenship for British National (Overseas) status holders and dependents, thus granting 2.9 million Hongkongers the eligibility for British citizenship. In the first year, 88,000 people applied for the BN(O) visa, a number which had grown to 191,000 by 2024. In the following few years, the number of Hongkongers moving to the UK via this pathway is projected to reach as high as 300,000, of whom 144,500 had already done so by January 2024.

== See also ==
- History of Hong Kong
- Demographics of Hong Kong
- Hong Kong returnee
- Chinese emigration
- British nationality law and Hong Kong
- Brain drain
- Yacht people
