= Britons in Hong Kong =

Total population
- 33,733 (2011)

Languages
- British English, Hong Kong Cantonese, Hong Kong English

Britons never made up more than a small portion of the population in Hong Kong, despite Hong Kong having been under British rule for more than 150 years. However, they did leave their mark on Hong Kong's institutions, culture and architecture. The British population in Hong Kong today consists mainly of career expatriates working in banking, education, real estate, law and consultancy, as well as many British-born ethnic Chinese, former Chinese émigrés to the UK and Hong Kongers (mostly ethnic Chinese) who successfully applied for full British citizenship before the transfer of sovereignty in 1997.

There were 33,733 Britons in Hong Kong, as of the 2011 Hong Kong Census.

== Numbers ==
Estimating the number of Britons in Hong Kong, as with the rest of Asia, can be difficult for a variety of reasons. One reason is that not all immigrants or visitors register with the British Consulate-General in Hong Kong. Another is that a large part of the British population is transitory, working in the city for only a few months or years.

Hong Kong's Immigration Department estimated that there were 35,000 British citizens living in the Special Administrative Region eight months after the handover of sovereignty in 1997. (This number included many British-born ethnic Hong Kong and ethnic Hong Kong who obtained full British citizenship in the 1990s under the British Nationality Selection Scheme in Hong Kong.) A large proportion of the British who were government employees left following the handover.

There have been noticeably fewer native Britons emigrating to Hong Kong since the handover. During British Hong Kong era, Britons wishing to live and work in Hong Kong were not subject to the immigration and visa restrictions that would apply today. It was common for young Britons to go to Hong Kong to work in blue-collar occupations, particularly during economic downturns in Britain. This advantage ended with the handover: Britons applying for permission to work in Hong Kong must now prove they will have jobs that cannot be filled by local residents, which means blue-collar jobs in Hong Kong (e.g., in retail or construction) are for the most part no longer an option for Britons.

In the decade before the handover around 3.4 million British Dependent Territories Citizens (BDTCs) of Hong Kong (mainly ethnic Chinese) acquired the status of British National (Overseas) (BN(O)) by registration. They do not have the right of abode in the UK (just as BDTCs did not have that right), and China does not recognise Hong Kong-born ethnic Chinese BN(O)s as British nationals. However, BN(O) are considered British outside China.

== Migration history ==
The first British presence in the area was the British East India Company, which started trading in the area in 1699 and set up a trading post in Canton in 1711. The British captured Hong Kong Island in 1841 during the First Opium War and were officially ceded the territory in 1842 under the Treaty of Nanking. Over the next 150 years Britons came to Hong Kong in relatively large numbers—many to work in the colony's administration, trading houses, and merchant banks—along with other Europeans and Americans.

Between 1991 and 1996 there was a substantial increase in the number of British citizens in Hong Kong; the number of UK passport holders in Hong Kong more than doubled, to over 34,000. This increase was mainly due to the British Nationality Selection Scheme, which granted British citizenship to 50,000 families (mostly ethnic Chinese), some of whom did not emigrate. However, in those years many young people from the United Kingdom went to Hong Kong to take up unskilled jobs (e.g., as doorpersons or in food service).

== Ethnicity ==
Among the 33,733 citizens of the United Kingdom living in Hong Kong, 19,405 are of some European ethnicity, 6,893 are Chinese, 2,337 are Indian, 1,047 are Pakistani, 829 are Nepalese, 273 are other Asians, 227 are Filipino, 98 are Thai, 40 are Japanese, and 40 are Indonesian. 2,544 other Britons are of a different ethnicity.

== Education ==
Schools using the education system of England in Hong Kong include:

- Harrow International School Hong Kong
- Kellett School – As of 2011 children with UK citizenship make up 69% of the student body
- Malvern College Hong Kong
- South Island School – As of 2011 children with UK citizenship are the largest component of the student body

== Religion ==
- The Cathedral Church of St John the Evangelist - As of 2011, it is one of the oldest Western ecclesiastical building of Hong Kong and as designed by British Gothic style in the city.
- Holy Trinity Cathedral

== See also ==
- Hong Kong–United Kingdom relations
- British Hong Kong
- Demographics of Hong Kong
- Gweilo
- Hong Kongers in the United Kingdom
- Britons in China
