= Yacht people =

Yacht people is a slang term for the wealthy residents of Hong Kong who fled the city in the 1980s and 1990s, prior to the city's return to Chinese rule in 1997. The term is a deliberate contrast to the poor "boat people" who fled southeast Asia (most notably Vietnam) in the 1970s. One of the destinations for the yacht people was Vancouver, British Columbia, Canada.

== See also ==
- Emigration from Hong Kong
