= British Nationality (Hong Kong) Selection Scheme =

British citizenship process

British Nationality (Hong Kong) Act 1990 (Note: Section 6(1).)
- Act of Parliament
- Parliament of the United Kingdom
- Long title: An Act to provide for the acquisition of British citizenship by selected Hong Kong residents, their spouses and minor children.
- Citation: 1990 c. 34
- Territorial extent: United Kingdom (Note: Section 6(5): the Act has the same extent as the provisions of the British Nationality Act 1981 mentioned in section 2(3).)

Dates
- Royal assent: 26 July 1990
- Commencement: 7 November 1990 (except section 2(2)) (Note: Section 6(4). The British Nationality (Hong Kong) Act 1990 (Commencement) Order 1990 (SI 1990/2210).)
Other legislation
Amended by	Nationality, Immigration and Asylum Act 2002; Nationality, Immigration and Asylum Act 2002 (Consequential and Incidental Provisions) Order 2003
Relates to	British Nationality Act 1981; Hong Kong (British Nationality) Order 1986; British Nationality (Selection Scheme) Order 1990

Status: Amended

Text of statute as originally enacted

Text of the British Nationality (Hong Kong) Act 1990 as in force today (including any amendments) within the United Kingdom, from legislation.gov.uk.

The British Nationality (Hong Kong) Selection Scheme, popularly known in Hong Kong as the British Nationality Selection Scheme (BNSS), was a process whereby the Governor of Hong Kong invited certain classes of people to apply, be considered, and be selected to register as British citizens under the British Nationality (Hong Kong) Act 1990 (c. 34). The qualifications for eligibility include citizens who were permanent residents of Hong Kong with the right of abode, and who were also considered British nationals under the British Nationality Act 1981, but were not British citizens (with the right of abode in the United Kingdom).

The scheme allowed at least 50,000 persons, and their spouses and children, to become British citizens by means of registration under the 1990 Act.

British nationals who were permanent residents of Hong Kong with the right of abode, who also met certain eligibility criteria, could apply to be selected and become registered as British citizens, under Section 1(1) of the 1990 Act, during two three-month periods:

- 1 December 1990 to 28 February 1991
- 3 January 1994 to 31 March 1994

The Governor and the Government of Hong Kong retained the power to invite, accept, process, and approve applications after 31 March 1994. However, no person could be registered by the British Home Secretary as a British citizen under that section of the 1990 Act after 30 June 1997.

Spouses and children of those who were granted British citizenship under section 1(1) could apply for registration under Section 1(4) of the Act. All applications from spouses and children for registration under section 1(4) were required to be made on or before 31 December 1996.

== Eligibility criteria ==
To be considered for registration as a British citizen under section 1(1), a person was required to be settled in Hong Kong and to be one of the following:

- A British Dependent Territories Citizen (BDTC) by virtue of a connection with Hong Kong, or an applicant for registration or naturalisation;
- A British National (Overseas) (BN(O)), British Overseas Citizen (BOC), British Subject (BS), or British Protected Person (BPP)

There were four classes of eligible section 1(1) applicants:

- General Occupational Class (GOC), for managers and professionals.
- Entrepreneurs Class (EC), for businessmen and women.
- Disciplined Services Class (DSC), for Hong Kong civil servants in the police, fire, immigration, customs, and correctional services.
- Sensitive Service Class (SSC), for those in public or private sector roles with particular vulnerabilities on account of their positions.

Selection of persons in the GOC and DSC classes was primarily based on a "points system". Applicants who, in addition to British nationality, held, claimed or possessed, voluntarily or involuntarily, nationality or citizenship of another country, other than (and excluding) the nationality of the People's Republic of China (PRC), were penalised in the points test, although it was not a bar to acceptance, selection and registration.

Spouses and children of family heads who registered under section 1(1) were eligible for registration under section 1(4) regardless of their nationality. However, a spouse who married the family head after that person was registered under section 1(1) was required to be settled in Hong Kong on the date of the marriage to be eligible for registration under section 1(4).

== Nationality status ==
Under subsection 2(2) of the British Nationality (Hong Kong) Act 1990, a BDTC who was successfully registered as a British citizen under BNSS automatically ceased to be a BDTC.

While the Act did not specify the loss of applicant's British National (Overseas) status, subsection 4(3) of the Hong Kong (British Nationality) Order 1986 specified that BN(O) status would be lost when the applicant ceased to be a BDTC. Hence, those who were registered as British citizens under the BNSS would only hold one class of British nationality.

Under Chinese nationality law and the respective explanations made by the Standing Committee of the National People's Congress, the British citizenship acquired by Chinese nationals in Hong Kong through BNSS is not recognised. They are not entitled to British consular protection in Hong Kong and other parts of the People's Republic of China.

== See also ==
- British nationality law
- British nationality law and Hong Kong
- History of British nationality law
