= British National (Overseas) =

Class of British nationality

- Traditional Chinese: 英國國民（海外）
Transcriptions
Standard Mandarin
- Hanyu Pinyin: Yīngguó guómín (hǎiwài)
Yue: Cantonese
- Yale Romanization: Yīng gwok gwok màhn (hói ngoih)
- Jyutping: Jing1 gwok3 gwok3 man4 (hoi2 ngoi6)

British National (Overseas), abbreviated as BN(O), is a class of British nationality associated with the former colony of Hong Kong. The status was acquired through voluntary registration by individuals with a connection to the territory who had been British Dependent Territories citizens (BDTCs) before the handover to China in 1997. Registration for BN(O) status was limited to the 10-year period preceding the transfer as a transitional arrangement for former BDTCs; current residents cannot newly acquire this nationality.

BN(O)s are British nationals and Commonwealth citizens, but not British citizens. They are subject to immigration controls when entering the United Kingdom and do not have automatic right of abode there or in Hong Kong, but all BN(O)s would have had permanent resident status in Hong Kong when they acquired this nationality. Following the Chinese government's imposition of a controversial national security law on Hong Kong in 2020, the UK has allowed BN(O)s and their dependent family members to apply for a renewable 5-year residence visa since 31 January 2021.

This nationality gives its holders favoured status when they are resident in the United Kingdom, conferring eligibility to vote, obtain citizenship under a simplified process, and serve in public office or government positions. There are an estimated 2.9 million BN(O)s; about 710,000 of them hold valid British passports with this status and enjoy consular protection when travelling abroad. However, the Chinese government does not recognise these passports as valid travel documents and restricts BN(O)s from accessing British consular protection from diplomatic missions located in Hong Kong and mainland China.

== Background ==
Hong Kong was a British colony from 1842 until its transfer to China in 1997. The territory initially consisted only of Hong Kong Island and was expanded to include Kowloon Peninsula and Stonecutters Island in 1860. All of these areas were ceded in perpetuity to the United Kingdom by the Qing dynasty after the Opium Wars. Britain negotiated a further expansion of the colony to include the New Territories in 1898, which were leased (rather than ceded) from Qing China for a period of 99 years.

As the end of the lease drew closer, Hong Kong's future was uncertain. Because most of the territory's industry was developed in the New Territories, separating the leased area and returning only that part of the colony to China was economically and logistically infeasible. The colonial government could not grant new land leases in the New Territories past 1997, causing concern among local businesses over the long-term viability of further real estate investment. By the time negotiations began over the future of the colony in the early 1980s, China had since become communist. Local residents were apprehensive about the prospect of being handed over to Chinese rule and overwhelmingly preferred that Hong Kong remain a British territory; contemporary opinion polls show that 85 per cent of residents favoured this option. The British government attempted to negotiate an extension of its administration of Hong Kong past 1997, but pivoted towards ensuring the city's stability when it became clear that the Chinese authorities would not allow this.

The two governments agreed on the Sino-British Joint Declaration in 1984. The United Kingdom would transfer the entire territory of Hong Kong at the conclusion of the New Territories lease in 1997 to the People's Republic of China, which promised to guarantee the continuation of the region's existing economic and political systems for 50 years after the handover. Hong Kong would become a special administrative region governed under Chinese sovereignty with a high level of autonomy in local affairs and its residents were to retain civil liberties such as freedom of speech, assembly, and religion after the transfer.

=== Nationality arrangements for residents ===
Before 1983, all citizens of the British Empire, including Hongkongers, held a common nationality. Citizens of the United Kingdom and Colonies (CUKCs) had the unrestricted right to enter and live in the UK, although non-white immigration was systemically discouraged. Immigration from the colonies and other Commonwealth countries was gradually restricted by Parliament from 1962 to 1971 amid decolonisation, when British subjects originating from outside of the British Islands first had immigration controls imposed on them when entering the UK. After passage of the British Nationality Act 1981, CUKCs were reclassified into different nationality groups based on their ancestry and birthplace, and the vast majority of British subjects in Hong Kong became British Dependent Territories citizens (BDTCs) with the right of abode only in Hong Kong. Only those reclassified as British citizens held an automatic right to live in the United Kingdom.

The British government issued a memorandum attached to the Joint Declaration that concerned transitional arrangements for the nationality of residents, which included a stipulation that a new nationality would be created for Hongkongers that did not confer right of abode in the United Kingdom. The Hong Kong Act 1985 created the British National (Overseas) status to fulfil this requirement. All BDTCs who did not have a connection with a remaining British Dependent Territory other than Hong Kong lost BDTC status on the day of the transfer in 1997. Ethnic Chinese Hongkongers became Chinese nationals and could only retain British nationality if they had registered as BN(O)s before the handover. Residents who were not ethnically Chinese, had not registered as BN(O)s, and would have been stateless on that date automatically became British Overseas citizens.

=== Debate over full citizenship rights ===
The deprivation of full passports and nationality rights for Hongkongers, and its reinforcement as part of the Joint Declaration, drew criticism for effectively making ethnicity the deciding factor in determining what rights British subjects were entitled to. Hong Kong residents and Legislative Council members, with some supporters in the British Parliament, believed that granting full British citizenship would have been more appropriate for instilling confidence in Hong Kong's post-handover future and that residents should have been offered a choice to continue living under British rule. Proponents argued that giving Hongkongers the right of abode as an "insurance policy" to protect against a potential curbing of civil freedoms by communist authorities after the handover would encourage them to stay in the territory and help prevent a mounting brain drain. BDTCs in Gibraltar and the Falkland Islands were already given access to citizenship, and it was noted that asking for the same to be granted to Hong Kong residents was only requesting equal treatment. Legislative Councillors and their supporters in Parliament unfavourably compared these nationality arrangements to the situation in Macau, where residents were allowed to retain Portuguese citizenship and right of abode after that territory's transfer to China in 1999.

A considerable number of residents began emigrating to other countries in the 1980s. While the number of annual departures remained steady for most of the decade and only started to increase towards its end, the outflow grew dramatically following the 1989 Tiananmen Square protests and massacre. The brutality of the Chinese government's response against demonstrations for democracy immediately dimmed local optimism in Hong Kong's future, indicated by a sudden drop in stock market and property values. The crackdown caused a rush among residents to seek permanent residency or citizenship in other countries. Residents feared an erosion of civil rights, the rule of law, and quality of life after the transition to Chinese rule, suspicions that were only exacerbated by the Tiananmen incident. Over a half million people left Hong Kong during the peak migration period from 1987 to 1996. Skepticism in the Chinese government's commitment to Hong Kong's future autonomy was further reflected by high demand for BDTC naturalisation. Even though BDTC status would expire after the handover in 1997 and carried no entitlement to UK right of abode, over 54,000 people applied for it on the final registration date in 1996 because the status qualified them to register as BN(O)s.

Despite petitions from Governors David Wilson and Chris Patten asking for full citizenship to be conferred on the colony's residents, Parliament ultimately refused to grant all Hongkongers right of abode in the United Kingdom, citing difficulty in absorbing a large number of new citizens and that doing so would contradict the Joint Declaration. Instead, it offered citizenship to only 50,000 qualified residents and their dependents, through the British Nationality Selection Scheme. Because many departing residents were well-educated and held critical positions in medicine, finance, and engineering, the intention of the plan was to convince people within this professional core of Hong Kong's economy to remain in the territory after 1997. This limited grant of citizenship, along with the fact that the provision for nationality without UK right of abode was included in a memorandum of the Joint Declaration and not in the treaty text, has been used by proponents of conferring citizenship on BN(O)s to argue that granting it would not be a violation of that agreement. On the other hand, the Chinese government considers even these restricted grants to be a breach of the treaty and specifically disregards the British citizenship of those who obtained it under the BNSS. Legislative Councillors derided the Selection Scheme as a thinly veiled attempt by the British government to absorb only the wealthy and well-educated elite and accused the UK of abandoning the moral responsibility it had for subjects in the colony.

=== Post-handover developments ===
Number of British National (Overseas) passports issued per year

In the immediate years after the territory's handover, Chinese oversight of Hong Kong was considered relatively benign and hands-off. Because virtually all BN(O)s are also entitled to Hong Kong Special Administrative Region (HKSAR) passports, the UK-issued passports were redundant for international travel. Some residents sold these documents to people smugglers, who used them to assist illegal mainland Chinese migrants in passing through border control when they entered Western countries. BN(O) passports at the time lacked sufficient anti-forgery measures and these documents were easily altered to match the details of other people. Passports issued since 2001 have been produced with digitised photos and signatures that mitigate counterfeiting issues.

While nearly 545,000 BN(O) passports were issued between 1997 and 2007, the rate of renewals for these documents dropped steadily during the immediate post-handover period. From a peak of 139,000 in 2001, just over 7,600 passports were issued in 2011. The usage and renewals of BN(O) passports have decreased, potentially influenced by the expansion of visa-free regions offered by HKSAR passports. This trend of decline began to reverse in the mid-2010s amid political unrest following the 2014 Hong Kong protests; about 37,000 BN(O)s renewed their passports in 2016. Renewals increased sharply following the start of large-scale anti-government protests in 2019. Over 154,000 passports were issued in that year, nearly doubling the number of valid passports in circulation. The upward shift continued through the following year; 315,000 people opted for renewals in 2020.

=== Expanded access to UK citizenship ===
Substantive debate on expanding BN(O) rights was restarted in 2020, when the National People's Congress (NPC) bypassed the Legislative Council and directly approved national security legislation for Hong Kong that severely penalises acts of secession and subversion against the state as a response to ongoing anti-government protests. This was done despite an explicit stipulation in the Hong Kong Basic Law stating the territory's responsibility for enacting its own legislation in that area. Pro-democracy Legislative Councillors and activists denounced the direct application of national law without local consultation as a fundamental upheaval of the regional legal system, labelling it as the end of territory's autonomy and "one country, two systems". The United Kingdom, along with its EU, Five Eyes, and G7 allies, further condemned the legislation as a severe violation of the Joint Declaration that inherently undermines the system of self-government promised to Hong Kong and the fundamental rights of its residents.

The Home Office initially announced that the existing six-month stay limit on BN(O)s would be extended to renewable periods of 12 months with the right to work. When the national security law came into force, the British government declared a further extension of residence rights; BN(O)s would have leave to remain in the UK with rights to work and study, after 5 years they may apply for settled status. They would then be eligible for full citizenship after holding settled status for 12 months. This was implemented as the eponymously named "British National (Overseas) visa", a residence permit that BN(O)s and their dependent family members have been able to apply for since 31 January 2021. BN(O)s and their dependents who arrived in the UK before the new immigration route became available were granted "Leave Outside the Rules" at the discretion of the Border Force to remain in the country for up to six months as a temporary measure. Despite the COVID-19 pandemic, about 7,000 people had entered the UK under this scheme between July 2020 and January 2021. The BN(O) visa was granted to over 97,000 applicants in 2021; As of 31 August 2022, there were over 133,000 BN(O) visas granted since January 2021.

Countering the expanded access to UK citizenship, the Chinese and Hong Kong governments withdrew their recognition of BN(O) passports as valid travel documents for immigration clearance. The territorial government further requested 14 countries that they stop accepting BN(O) passports for issuing working holiday visas, although the documents remain valid for visa purposes in all of those nations. The NPC again directly legislated for the region in March 2021, approving a rework of local election laws that reduces the number of Legislative Council seats elected by the public and establishes a screening committee to scrutinise the political loyalty of candidates for public office. Since this decision, the UK has considered China to be in a "state of ongoing non-compliance" with the Joint Declaration.

== Acquisition and loss ==
Application deadlines for registration as a British National (Overseas)
Year of birth	Registration deadline
1967 to 1971	30 October 1993
1962 to 1966	31 March 1994
1957 to 1961	31 August 1994
1947 to 1956	28 February 1995
Prior to 1947	30 June 1995
1972 to 1976	31 October 1995
1977 to 1981	30 March 1996
1982 to 1986	29 June 1996
1987 to 1991	30 September 1996
1992 to 1995	31 December 1996
1996	31 March 1997
1 January to 30 June 1997	30 September 1997
People Naturalised as BDTC after the deadline	3 months after the issue of naturalisation certificate

Becoming a British National (Overseas) is no longer possible. Acquisition was not an automatic process and eligible residents had to have applied for the status between 1 July 1987 and the end of the registration period. Registration deadlines were assigned to applicants by their birth year. The last date on which eligible applicants could register was 31 December 1997, if they were born in that year and prior to the transfer of sovereignty. BN(O) nationality cannot be transferred by descent, and the number of living status holders will dwindle until there are none. The status was granted in addition to other British nationality classes; an individual can be both a British citizen and a British National (Overseas).

Applicants were required to be British Dependent Territories citizens who held that status solely by a connection with Hong Kong. Connection in this context generally means having acquired BDTC status by birth or naturalisation in the colony, or by birth to a parent who fulfilled these requirements. While about 3.4 million people acquired BN(O) nationality, 2.5 million non-BDTC residents (virtually all Chinese nationals) were ineligible. Those ineligible who wished to register as BN(O)s were required to have been naturalised as Hong Kong-connected BDTCs by 31 March 1996. Acquiring Hong Kong BDTC status other than by birth was no longer possible after that date.

Unlike other British nationalities, BN(O) holders are uniquely entitled to hold British passports in that status. Every BN(O) was directly issued a British National (Overseas) passport when they first obtained the status, while members of all other nationality classes are first given certificates of registration and do not receive passports automatically. All Hong Kong-connected British Dependent Territories citizens lost BDTC status on 1 July 1997. Individuals who did not acquire Chinese nationality (this generally only applied to those not ethnically Chinese) and would have been stateless at that date automatically became British Overseas citizens.

British National (Overseas) status can be relinquished by a declaration made to the Home Secretary provided that the declarant already possesses or intends to acquire another nationality. Prior to 1 July 1997, deprivation of this nationality was also tied to the loss of British Dependent Territories citizenship. Individuals who successfully registered as British citizens under the British Nationality Selection Scheme automatically lost BDTC status, and consequently also lost BN(O) nationality if they had acquired it. There is no path to restore BN(O) status once lost.

== Rights and privileges ==
British Nationals (Overseas) are exempted from obtaining visas or entry certificates when visiting the United Kingdom for less than six months. They and their dependent family members are eligible to apply for the "British National (Overseas) visa", an indefinitely renewable residence permit valid for either a period of 30 months or 5 years. BN(O)s under the age of 30 are also eligible for two-year working holiday visas and do not face annual quotas or sponsorship requirements.

BN(O)s are not considered foreign nationals when residing in the UK and are entitled to certain rights as Commonwealth citizens. These include exemption from registration with local police, voting eligibility in UK elections, and the ability to enlist in the British Armed Forces. British Nationals (Overseas) are also eligible to serve in nearly all Civil Service posts (except for those in His Majesty's Diplomatic Service and the Foreign, Commonwealth and Development Office), be granted British honours, receive peerages, and sit in the House of Lords. If given indefinite leave to remain (ILR), they are eligible to stand for election to the House of Commons and local government. About 2.9 million people retain BN(O) nationality, with about 710,000 of them holding valid British passports with the status as of 2025. When travelling in other countries, they may seek British consular protection. BN(O)s (as well as all other British nationals) who are in same-sex relationships may choose to register marriages under UK law at British diplomatic missions in countries where such unions would otherwise be illegal, subject to the approval of local authorities.

BN(O)s may become British citizens by registration, rather than naturalisation, after residing in the United Kingdom for 5 years and possessing ILR for a further 12 months. Registration confers citizenship otherwise than by descent, meaning that children born outside of the UK to those successfully registered will be British citizens by descent. Becoming a British citizen has no effect on BN(O) status, someone can concurrently possess a British citizen passport and a BN(O) passport. Alternatively, the British citizen passport can be issued upon request with the observation that states the holder's right of abode in Hong Kong, and the British National (Overseas) status.

Prior to 1997, BN(O)s in qualified occupational classes were eligible to register as British citizens without UK residence requirements under the British Nationality Selection Scheme at the discretion of the Governor of Hong Kong. Additionally, BN(O)s who are not Chinese nationals and held no foreign nationality on 3 February 1997, who were ordinarily resident in Hong Kong on that date, and who continue to reside there are entitled to register as British citizens. Children born after that date who later became BN(O)s and fulfil the other requirements may also register for citizenship. Whether these applicants receive citizenship by descent or otherwise is dependent on how they obtained BDTC status. Remaining BN(O)s who held no other citizenship or nationality on or before 19 March 2009 are entitled to register as British citizens by descent. However, if a BN(O) acquires another citizenship or nationality and renounces it after either applicable date before applying to register as a British citizen, that person would not be eligible.

== Restrictions ==
Although British National (Overseas)s may travel using a BN(O) passport, because the status does not entitle its holders to the right of abode in either the United Kingdom or Hong Kong, they may face restrictions when travelling to either place and are not treated identically to British citizens when entering other countries. Although the Joint Declaration allows continued use of foreign passports as travel documents post-handover, the Chinese and Hong Kong governments have not allowed BN(O) passports to be used for immigration clearance since 31 January 2021.

=== United Kingdom ===
British Nationals (Overseas), as British nationals and Commonwealth citizens, are subject to immigration controls when they enter UK territory. Unless they are British citizens, BN(O) citizens have neither the right of abode nor automatic right to work in the United Kingdom. According to United Kingdom immigration rules, BN(O) citizens do not need Electronic Travel Authorisation (ETA) to enter the country. They do not need any entry clearance or visa to stay in the United Kingdom for up to six months. BN(O) citizens are currently ineligible for the Registered Traveller service, which enables expedited clearance through UK border, whereas Hong Kong Special Administrative Region passport holders who fulfil the necessary criteria are.

To continue to live in the United Kingdom, BN(O)s are required to pay an immigration health surcharge to access National Health Service benefits when applying for a bespoke visa and do not usually qualify for most welfare programmes.

=== Hong Kong and China ===
The vast majority of British Nationals (Overseas) are ethnically Chinese and were involuntarily regarded as Chinese nationals in Hong Kong upon the transfer of sovereignty in 1997. Individuals who hold Chinese nationality concurrently with any other nationality, including BN(O) status, are treated solely as Chinese nationals under Chinese nationality law. Consequently, most BN(O) citizens cannot access British consular protection while in Hong Kong, Macau, or mainland China. Additionally, BN(O)s who are Chinese nationals must use a Mainland Travel Permit to enter mainland China.

Until 31 January 2021, BN(O) citizens were able to use their BN(O) passports for immigration clearance in Hong Kong and to seek consular protection from overseas Chinese diplomatic missions. Since that date, the Chinese and Hong Kong governments have prohibited the use of BN(O) passports as travel documents or proof of identity. BN(O) citizens who do not possess Chinese (or any other) nationality are required to use a Document of Identity for Visa Purposes for travel. This restriction disproportionally affects ease of travel for permanent residents of South Asian ethnicity, who were not automatically granted Chinese nationality in 1997. As an additional consequence, Hongkongers seeking early pre-retirement withdrawals from the Mandatory Provident Fund pension scheme may not use BN(O) passports for identity verification.

BN(O) citizens are barred from registering same-sex marriages at the British Consulate-General, Hong Kong. Consular same-sex marriages under UK law are contingent on local authority approval, which the Hong Kong government has explicitly denied. Conversely, Chinese authorities have not prohibited these marriages from taking place in mainland China.

Although registration for BN(O) status was dependent on permanent residency in Hong Kong, it is possible for some BN(O) citizens to lose their right of abode in Hong Kong. Non-Chinese nationals who hold permanent residency or citizenship elsewhere and have not returned to Hong Kong for more than a continuous period of three years will automatically lose their right of abode. However, these individuals acquire the right to land, which is identical to the right of abode except that they can be subject to a deportation order. BN(O) citizens subject to a deportation order would lose the right to land and, if without any other nationality, would become effectively stateless.

=== European Union ===
Before the United Kingdom withdrew from the European Union on 31 January 2020, most British citizens were also European Union citizens. Similar to British citizens who only have connections to the Channel Islands or Isle of Man but not mainland United Kingdom, British Nationals (Overseas) were regarded as British nationals but not UK nationals for the purpose of European Union law. Therefore, they could not exercise freedom of movement rights within the European Union. BN(O) citizens, as with British citizens, are exempt from obtaining a visa when visiting the Schengen Area after Brexit.

British citizens (including those from the Channel Islands, Isle of Man and Gibraltar) may continue to exercise freedom of movement in Ireland (part of the Common Travel Area with the UK); BN(O) citizens have never been granted this right.
