= Immigration Act =

Stock short title used for legislation

Immigration Act (with its variations) is a stock short title used for legislation in many countries relating to immigration.

The Bill for an Act with this short title will have been known as a Immigration Bill during its passage through Parliament.

Immigration Acts may be a generic name either for legislation bearing that short title or for all legislation which relates to immigration.

== List ==
=== Australia ===
- Immigration Restriction Act 1901
- Migration Act 1958

=== Canada ===
- Immigration Act, 1906
- Chinese Immigration Act of 1923
- Immigration Act, 1952
- Immigration Act, 1976
- Immigration and Refugee Protection Act, 2002

=== Hong Kong ===
- Immigration Ordinance 1972

=== Malaysia ===
- Immigration Act 1959/63

=== New Zealand ===
- Immigration Act 1987
- Immigration Act 2009

=== United Kingdom ===
- Commonwealth Immigrants Act 1962 (10 & 11 Eliz. 2. c. 21)
- Commonwealth Immigrants Act 1968 (c. 9)
- Immigration Act 1971 (c. 77)
- British Nationality Act 1981 (c. 61)
- Immigration Act 1988 (c. 14)
- British Nationality (Hong Kong) Act 1990 (c. 34)
- Asylum and Immigration Act 1996
- Special Immigration Appeals Commission Act 1997 (c. 68)
- Immigration and Asylum Act 1999 (c. 33)
- Nationality, Immigration and Asylum Act 2002 (c. 41)
- Asylum and Immigration (Treatment of Claimants, etc.) Act 2004 (c. 19)
- Immigration, Asylum and Nationality Act 2006 (c. 13)
- Borders, Citizenship and Immigration Act 2009 (c. 11)
- Immigration Act 2014 (c. 22)
- Immigration Act 2016 (c. 19)

=== United States ===
- Page Act of 1875
- Immigration Act of 1882
- Immigration Act of 1903
- Immigration Act of 1907
- Immigration Act of 1917
- Immigration Act of 1918
- Immigration Restriction Act of 1921
- Immigration Act of 1924
- Immigration and Nationality Act of 1952
- Immigration and Nationality Act of 1965
- Immigration Reform and Control Act of 1986
- Immigration Act of 1990

=== Others ===
- European Union Asylum and Immigration Act
- Law No. 2011-672 on Immigration, Integration and Nationality (2011 French Immigration Law)

== See also ==
- List of short titles
