= Immigration, Asylum and Nationality Act 2006 =

Act of the Parliament of the United Kingdom

Immigration, Asylum and Nationality Act 2006 (Note: Section 64(1).)
- Act of Parliament
- Parliament of the United Kingdom
- Long title: An Act to make provision about immigration, asylum and nationality; and for connected purposes.
- Citation: 2006 c. 13
- Territorial extent: England and Wales; Scotland; Northern Ireland; (Note: Section 63.)

Dates
- Royal assent: 30 March 2006
- Commencement: Various (Note: Section 62.)
Other legislation
| Amends | Prison Act 1952; Immigration Act 1971; Race Relations Act 1976; Protection from Eviction Act 1977; Interpretation Act 1978; Customs and Excise Management Act 1979; British Nationality Act 1981; Asylum and Immigration Act 1996; Special Immigration Appeals Commission Act 1997; National Minimum Wage Act 1998; Immigration and Asylum Act 1999; Anti-terrorism, Crime and Security Act 2001; Nationality, Immigration and Asylum Act 2002; Asylum and Immigration (Treatment of Claimants, etc.) Act 2004; Civil Partnership Act 2004 |
| Amended by | Police and Justice Act 2006; Nationality, Immigration and Asylum Act 2002 (Juxtaposed Controls) (Amendment) Order 2006; UK Borders Act 2007; Channel Tunnel (International Arrangements and Miscellaneous Provisions) (Amendment) Order 2007; Counter-Terrorism Act 2008; Borders, Citizenship and Immigration Act 2009; Equality Act 2010 (Consequential Amendments, Saving and Supplementary Provisions) Order 2010; Transfer of Functions of the Asylum and Immigration Tribunal Order 2010; Immigration (Guernsey) Order 2011; Immigration (Jersey) Order 2012; Crime and Courts Act 2013; Police and Fire Reform (Scotland) Act 2012 (Consequential Provisions and Modifications) Order 2013; Immigration Act 2014; Counter-Terrorism and Security Act 2015; Immigration Act 2016; Sentencing Act 2020; Nationality and Borders Act 2022; Criminal Justice Act 2003 (Commencement No. 33) and Sentencing Act 2020 (Commencement No. 2) Regulations 2022; Judicial Review and Courts Act 2022 (Magistrates’ Court Sentencing Powers) Regulations 2023; Border Security, Asylum and Immigration Act 2025 |

Status: Amended

History of passage through Parliament

Text of statute as originally enacted

Revised text of statute as amended

The Immigration, Asylum and Nationality Act 2006 (c. 13) is an act of the Parliament of the United Kingdom.

It is the fifth major piece of legislation relating to immigration and asylum since 1993.

== Provisions ==
=== Appeals ===
The Act introduced a number of changes to the immigration appeals process, most notably restricting the right of appeal for refusal of entry clearance in cases where the subject intends to enter the country as a dependent, a visitor or a student.

This leaves the only grounds for appeal open to human rights and race discrimination reasons. Appeals launched within the UK can be for asylum cases only.

=== Employment ===
The Act introduces civil (not criminal) penalties in the form of fines for employers who take on people over the age of 16 who are subject to immigration control (that is, have no entry clearance or leave to remain, or no valid permit to work in the UK).

=== Information ===
The Act allows immigration officers to request and obtain biometric data (such as fingerprints) from immigration arrivals for the purposes of proving they are the rightful holder of their passport or travel documents. The act allows for data sharing between the Immigration Service, police services and HMRC.

It allows the police to request and obtain advance information on passengers and crew of flights and ships arriving in or leaving the United Kingdom, or those expected to do so.

The Act requires the Asylum and Immigration Tribunal and the Special Immigration Appeals Commission to first consider if an application for refugee status meets article 1F of the Convention Relating to the Status of Refugees, if the decision by the Home Secretary is to refuse on that basis.

=== Citizenship and right of abode ===
The act contains several provisions empowering the Home Secretary to deprive a person of British citizenship (or right of abode) if it is considered that such deprivation is "conducive to the public good".

== Commencement orders ==
Although the act received royal assent on 30 March, its provisions did not take effect immediately, until a series of commencement orders brought the provisions into force incrementally:

- The Immigration, Asylum and Nationality Act 2006 (Commencement No. 1) Order 2006 (S.I. 2006/1497 (C. 50)), made on 2 June 2006, brought into force on 16 June 2006 the sections on grants, proof of right of abode, accommodation, removal: cancellation of leave, deprivation of citizenship, deprivation of right of abode, and money. It also repealed section 40A(3) of the British Nationality Act 1981.
- The Immigration, Asylum and Nationality Act 2006 (Commencement No. 2) Order 2006 (S.I. 2006/2226 (C. 75)), made on 13 August 2006, enacted the bulk of the Act's provisions including the sections on variation of leave to enter or remain, removal, grounds of appeal, failure to provide documents, refusal of leave to enter, deportation, continuation of leave, consequential amendments, code of practice, discrimination: code of practice, documents produced or found, fingerprinting, attendance for fingerprinting, searches: contracting out, information: embarking passengers, inspection of detention facilities, capacity to make nationality application, arrest pending deportation, refugee convention: construction, refugee convention:certification, detained persons: national minimum wage. It also repealed sections of the Prison Act 1952 (c.52), the Immigration Act 1971 (c.77), the Anti-terrorism, Crime and Security Act 2001 and the Nationality, Immigration and Asylum Act 2002 (c.41).
- The Immigration, Asylum and Nationality Act 2006 (Commencement No. 3) Order 2006 (S.I. 2006/2838 (C. 98)), made on 4 December 2006, enacted the remainder of the Act's provisions including the sections on abandonment of appeal and acquisition of British nationality.

== Notable applications of the act ==
- Australian Guantánamo Bay inmate David Matthew Hicks applied for British citizenship in 2005 after the previous 2002 legislation allowed citizenship by virtue of maternal heritage. It was considered that the British government may petition for his release as had been done for other British nationals. After a lengthy court battle with the Home Office, Hicks was granted British citizenship on 5 July 2006, but then stripped of it several hours later as a result of the changes that S.56 of this act made to S.40 of the British Nationality Act 1981. Said changes under section 56 of the act allowed the Home Secretary to "deprive a person of a citizenship status if the Secretary of State is satisfied that deprivation is conducive to the public good."
- Anna Chapman

== See also ==
- British nationality law
- History of British nationality law
