= Immigration Appellate Authority =

The Immigration Appellate Authority (IAA) was an independent judicial body in the United Kingdom constituted under the Immigration Act 1971, with jurisdiction to hear appeals from many immigration and asylum decisions. Administered by the Tribunals Service, it was superseded in 2005 by the Asylum and Immigration Tribunal, which itself was superseded in 2010 by the Asylum and Immigration Chamber of the First-tier Tribunal created by the Tribunals, Courts and Enforcement Act 2007.

== Description ==
The system of appeals to adjudicators appointed by the Home Secretary, with the right of appeal to a body then called the Immigration Appeal Tribunal, with members appointed by the Lord Chancellor, was created by the Immigration Appeals Act 1969. As a result of the Immigration Act 1971, the Immigration Appellate Authority (IAA) became an independent judicial body consisting of two tiers: Immigration Adjudicators and an Immigration Appeal Tribunal (IAT). The Adjudicators initially considered appeals against decisions made by Immigration Officers, entry clearance officers and the Home Secretary, based in permanent centres in Islington, London, Hatton Cross, Birmingham, Leeds, Manchester and Glasgow. The Tribunal dealt with applications for leave to appeal and appeals against decisions made by the Immigration Adjudicators, with its main hearing centre in Bream's Buildings, off Chancery Lane in Central London.

The Tribunal was headed by a President, who was required to be a barrister or a solicitor of at least seven years' standing. From 1999, a High Court judge was appointed President rather than a member of the IAA. Both lay members and legally-qualified members were appointed to the IAT.

== Presidents of the Immigration Appeal Tribunal ==
- -1997: George Farmer
- 1997–1999: David Pearl
- 1999–2002: Sir Andrew Collins
- 2002–2005: Sir Duncan Ouseley

== Replacement ==
The two tier structure of the Immigration Appellate Authority was abolished by the Asylum and Immigration (Treatment of Claimants, etc.) Act 2004, which created the single tier Asylum and Immigration Tribunal to replace it. All former adjudicators and members of the IAA became members of the new AIT. The Home Office Adjudicators became known as Immigration Judges, although many of them were not formally qualified as judges. The former 'regional adjudicators' became known as Senior Immigration Judges, mostly involved in reconsidering applications for challenging the outcome of appeals.

== See also ==
- Immigration to the United Kingdom
- Special Immigration Appeals Commission
- Right of asylum
- Office of the Immigration Services Commissioner
