= British nationality law =

The primary legislation governing nationality in the United Kingdom is the British Nationality Act 1981, which came into force on 1 January 1983. Its provisions apply to the British Islands (comprising the United Kingdom (England, Wales, Scotland, and Northern Ireland) and the Crown dependencies of Jersey, Guernsey, and the Isle of Man) and the 14 British Overseas Territories.

The six classes of British nationality provide differing levels of civil and political rights, reflecting the United Kingdom's historical legacy as a colonial power. The primary form is British citizenship, which is linked to the British Islands and confers full rights. Those connected with a current overseas territory are classified as British Overseas Territories citizens (BOTCs), and since 2002, nearly all BOTCs, except those associated solely with Akrotiri and Dhekelia, have also held British citizenship. Other residual forms of British nationality generally linked to former colonies and now largely closed to new acquisition include the statuses of British Overseas citizen, British subject, British National (Overseas) and British protected person. These categories do not confer automatic right of abode in the United Kingdom and offer limited entitlements.

All individuals born in the British Islands prior to 1 January 1983 were automatically granted British citizenship by birth (jus soli), irrespective of their parents' nationalities. To become a British Citizen under the 1981 Act, it was necessary to hold Citizenship of the UK and Colonies as well as Right of abode in the United Kingdom on 31 December 1982, without which a person would either hold British Overseas Territory citizenship, or British Overseas citizenship.

Since that date, birthright citizenship in those territories has been limited to children with at least one parent who is either a British citizen or holds settled status in the United Kingdom (jus sanguinis). Foreign nationals may apply to naturalise as British citizens after fulfilling a minimum residence requirement, typically five years, and obtaining settled status.

The United Kingdom was formerly a member of the European Union (EU), and during its membership, British citizens were also EU citizens. This conferred automatic and permanent rights to live and work in any EU or European Free Trade Association (EFTA) country, along with the right to vote in elections to the European Parliament. Although the United Kingdom left the EU in 2020 following Brexit, British citizens retain permanent rights to live and work in the Republic of Ireland through the Common Travel Area arrangement.

== Terminology ==
The distinction between the meaning of the terms citizenship and nationality is not always clear in the English language and differs by country. Generally, nationality refers to a person's legal belonging to a sovereign state and is the common term used in international treaties when addressing members of a country, while citizenship usually means the set of rights and duties a person has in that nation. This distinction is clearly defined in many non-English speaking countries but not in the Anglosphere.

Historically, an individual associated with Britain was neither a national nor a citizen, but a British subject. British citizenship was not created until passage of the British Nationality Act 1981. This Act defined six types of nationality dependent on a person's connections with the United Kingdom, overseas territories, or former colonies.

British citizens hold their status because of a close connection with the British Islands, usually through their own (or parents' or grandparents') birth, adoption, naturalisation, or registration as citizens of the UK. This was defined as right of abode by the Immigration Act 1971.

=== Types of British nationality ===
There are six types of British nationality:

- British citizen (for the United Kingdom and Crown Dependencies)
- British Overseas Territories citizen (BOTC)
- British Overseas citizen (BOC)
- British National (Overseas) (BN(O))
- British subject
- British protected person

Of these statuses, only British citizenship grants automatic right of abode in the United Kingdom. British Overseas Territories are areas outside of the British Islands where the UK holds sovereignty. Since 2002, nearly all BOTCs also hold British citizenship, except for those associated with Akrotiri and Dhekelia.

The other four categories are residual nationality classes that generally cannot be acquired. BOCs are people connected with former British colonies who have no close ties to the UK or overseas territories. Many such people were descendants of Indian-born British subjects who had migrated to African countries and could not obtain local citizenship; as they did not hold right of abode, they did not become British citizens.

British subjects (Note: as defined by the 1981 Act) hold their status through a connection either to former British India or to what became the Republic of Ireland, as they existed before 1949; as they did not hold right of abode, they also did not become British citizens.

British protected persons come from areas controlled by the British Empire that were never formally incorporated as Crown territory; this includes protectorates, protected states, mandated territories, and Indian princely states. It is only possible to retain this status if a person has not gained any other nationality since August 1978. BN(O)s are Hong Kong residents who voluntarily registered for this status before the territory's transfer to China in 1997.

== History ==
=== Development from feudal allegiance ===
Before the concept of nationality was codified in legislation, inhabitants of English communities owed allegiance to their feudal lords, who were themselves vassals of the monarch. This system of loyalty, indirectly owed to the monarch personally, developed into a general establishment of subjecthood to the Crown. Calvin's Case in 1608 established the principle of jus soli, that all those who were born within Crown dominions were natural-born subjects. After passage of the Acts of Union 1707, English and Scottish subjects became British subjects. Similarly, the Kingdom of Ireland was merged with the Kingdom of Great Britain to form the United Kingdom of Great Britain and Ireland in 1801. Natural-born subjects were considered to owe perpetual allegiance to the Crown and could not voluntarily renounce British subject status until this was first permitted in 1870.

Prior to 1708, foreigners could only be naturalised through Acts of Parliament. Protestants fleeing religious persecution in mainland Europe were allowed to naturalise as subjects in 1708, but this was quickly repealed in 1711 in response to the number of migrants exercising that ability. A standard administrative process was not introduced until 1844, when applicants were first able to acquire naturalisation grants from the Home Office. Despite the creation of this pathway, personalised naturalising legislation continued to be enacted until 1975.

The monarch could personally make any individual a subject by royal prerogative. By this method, a foreigner became a denizen – although they were no longer considered an alien, they could not pass subject status to their children by descent and were barred from Crown service and public office. This mechanism was no longer used after 1873.

Until the mid-19th century, it was unclear whether nationality regulations in the United Kingdom were applicable elsewhere in the British Empire. Individual colonies had each developed their own procedures and requirements for naturalisation, granting subject status at the discretion of the local governments. In 1847, Parliament formalised a clear distinction between subjects who were naturalised in the UK and those who became British subjects in other territories. Individuals who naturalised in the UK were deemed to have received the status by imperial naturalisation, which was valid throughout the Empire. Those naturalising in colonies were said to have gone through local naturalisation and were given subject status valid only within the relevant territory; a subject who locally naturalised in Canada was a British subject there, but not in England or New Zealand. When travelling outside of the Empire, British subjects who were locally naturalised in a colony were still entitled to imperial protection.

Certain territories that came under British jurisdiction were not formally incorporated as Crown territory proper. These included protectorates, protected states, mandated territories, and Indian princely states. Because domestic law treated these areas as foreign territory, birth in one of these areas did not automatically confer British subject status. Instead, most people associated with these territories were designated as British protected persons. British protected persons were treated as aliens in the United Kingdom, but both British subjects and protected persons could be issued British passports. Protected persons could not travel to the UK without first requesting permission, but were afforded the same consular protection as British subjects when travelling outside of the Empire.

=== Imperial common code ===
Parliament brought regulations for British subject status into codified statute law for the first time with passage of the British Nationality and Status of Aliens Act 1914 (4 & 5 Geo. 5. c. 17). British subject status was standardised as a common nationality across the Empire. Dominions that adopted Part II of this Act as part of local legislation were authorised to grant subject status to aliens by imperial naturalisation.

The 1914 regulations codified the doctrine of coverture into imperial nationality law, where a woman's consent to marry a foreigner was also assumed to be intent to denaturalise; British women who married foreign men automatically lost their British nationality. There were two exceptions to this: a wife married to a husband who lost his British subject status was able to retain British nationality by declaration, and a British-born widow or divorcée who had lost her British nationality through marriage could reacquire that status without meeting residence requirements after the dissolution or termination of her marriage.

By the end of the First World War, the Dominions had exercised increasing levels of autonomy in managing their own affairs and each by then had developed a distinct national identity. Britain formally recognised this at the 1926 Imperial Conference, jointly issuing the Balfour Declaration with all the Dominion heads of government, which stated that the United Kingdom and Dominions were autonomous and equal to each other within the British Commonwealth of Nations. Full legislative independence was granted to the Dominions with passage of the Statute of Westminster 1931.

Women's rights groups throughout the Empire pressured the imperial government during this time to amend nationality regulations that tied a married woman's status to that of her husband. Because the government could no longer enforce legislative supremacy over the Dominions after 1931 and wanted to maintain a strong constitutional link to them through the common nationality code, it was unwilling to make major changes without unanimous agreement among the Dominions on this issue, which it did not have. Imperial legal uniformity was nevertheless eroded during the 1930s; New Zealand and Australia amended their laws in 1935 and 1936 to allow women denaturalised by marriage to retain their rights as British subjects, and Ireland changed its regulations in 1935 to cause no change to a woman's nationality after her marriage.

==== Irish independence ====
Irish resistance to the Union and desire for local self-governance led to the Irish War of Independence. During the war, the island of Ireland was partitioned into two parts. Arising from the Anglo-Irish Treaty that ended the war, Southern Ireland became the Irish Free State in 1922, while Northern Ireland remains part of the United Kingdom. Under the terms of the Anglo-Irish Treaty, Northern Ireland was included in the Irish Free State on independence, but had the right to opt out of the new state within one month of its establishment. This option was exercised on 7 December 1922. The 24-hour period in which Northern Ireland was officially part of the Irish Free State meant that every person ordinarily resident in Northern Ireland on 6 December who fulfilled the citizenship provisions in the Constitution of the Irish Free State had automatically become an Irish citizen on that date.

At its inception, the Irish Free State gained independence as a Dominion within the British Empire. Imperial legislation at the time dictated that although individual Dominions could define a citizenship for their own citizens, that citizenship would only be effective within the local Dominion's borders. A Canadian, New Zealand, or Irish citizen who travelled outside of their own country would have been regarded as a British subject. This was reinforced by Article 3 of the 1922 Free State Constitution, which stated that Irish citizenship could be exercised "within the limits of the jurisdiction of the Irish Free State".

When Free State authorities were first preparing to issue Irish passports in 1923, the British government insisted on the inclusion of some type of wording that described the holders of these passports as "British subjects". The two sides could not reach agreement on this issue and when the Irish government began issuing passports in 1924, British authorities refused to accept these documents. British consular staff were instructed to confiscate any Irish passports that did not include the term "British subject" and replace them with British passports. This situation continued until 1930, when Irish passports were amended to describe its holders as "one of His Majesty's subjects of the Irish Free State". Despite these disagreements, the two governments agreed not to establish border controls between their jurisdictions and all Irish citizens and British subjects continued to have the ability to move freely within the Common Travel Area. Although Irish citizens have not been considered British subjects under Irish law since 1935, the British government continued to treat virtually all Irish citizens as British subjects, except for those who had acquired Irish citizenship by naturalisation since the Free State had not incorporated part II of the British Nationality and Status of Aliens Act 1914 (4 & 5 Geo. 5. c. 17) into its legislation.

=== Changing relationship with the Empire and Commonwealth ===
Diverging developments in Dominion legislation, as well as growing assertions of local national identity separate from that of Britain and the Empire, culminated with the creation of a substantive Canadian citizenship in 1946, breaking the system of a common imperial nationality. Combined with the approaching independence of India and Pakistan in 1947, comprehensive reform to nationality law was necessary at this point to address ideas that were incompatible with the previous system.

The British Nationality Act 1948 redefined British subject as any citizen of the United Kingdom, its colonies, or other Commonwealth countries. Commonwealth citizen was first defined in this Act to have the same meaning. This alternative term was necessary to retain a number of newly independent countries in the Commonwealth that wished to become republics rather than preserve the monarch as head of state. The change in naming also indicated a shift in the base theory to this aspect of British nationality; allegiance to the Crown was no longer a requirement to possess British subject status and the common status would be maintained by voluntary agreement among the various members of the Commonwealth.

British subject/Commonwealth citizen status co-existed with the citizenships of each Commonwealth country. A person born in Australia would be both an Australian citizen and a British subject. British subjects under the previous meaning who held that status on 1 January 1949 because of a connection with the United Kingdom or a remaining colony became Citizens of the United Kingdom and Colonies (CUKC). CUKC status was the principal form of British nationality during this period of time.

There was also a category of people called British subjects without citizenship. Irish citizens who fulfilled certain requirements could file formal claims with the Home Secretary to remain British subjects under this definition. Additionally, those who did not qualify for CUKC status or citizenship in other Commonwealth countries, or were connected with a country that had not yet defined citizenship laws, would transitionally remain British subjects in this group.

==== Irish departure from the Commonwealth ====
Despite the accommodations for republics, Ireland ended its Commonwealth membership in 1948 when it formally declared itself a republic and removed the British monarch's remaining official functions in the Irish state. This was recognised by Britain after passage of the Ireland Act 1949 (which was made retrospective to the date of independence). Although Irish citizens have no longer been defined as British subjects in British law since 1949, they continue to be treated as non-foreign in the United Kingdom and retain the same rights and privileges exercised by Commonwealth citizens; Irish citizens remain eligible to vote and stand for parliament in the UK.

The British Nationality Act 1948 unintentionally excluded certain British subjects associated with Ireland from acquiring CUKC status. The wording of that law did not take into account the 24-hour period during which Northern Ireland was part of the Irish Free State in 1922. Individuals born before 1922 in the area that became the Republic of Ireland to fathers also born in that area but were domiciled in Northern Ireland on Irish independence had nevertheless automatically acquired Irish citizenship. The Ireland Act 1949 specifically addresses this by deeming any person in such circumstances who had never registered for Irish citizenship and had not permanently resided in the Republic between 10 April 1935 and 1 January 1949 as a CUKC and having never ceased to be a British subject.

==== British Nationality (Irish Citizens) Act 2024 ====
British Nationality (Irish Citizens) Act 2024 (Note: Section 2(4).)
- Act of Parliament
- Parliament of the United Kingdom
- Long title: An Act to make provision for Irish citizens who have been resident in the United Kingdom for five years to be entitled to British citizenship; and for connected purposes.
- Citation: 2024 c. 19
- Introduced by: Gavin Robinson MP (Commons); Lord Hay of Ballyore (Lords)
- Territorial extent: England and Wales; Scotland; Northern Ireland; Guernsey; Jersey; Isle of Man; British Overseas Territories; (Note: Section 2(1)–(2).)

Dates
- Royal assent: 24 May 2024
- Commencement: 22 July 2025 (Note: Section 2(3). The British Nationality (Irish Citizens) Act 2024 (Commencement) Regulations 2025 (SI 2025/787).)
Other legislation
Amends	British Nationality Act 1981; Illegal Migration Act 2023

Status: Current legislation

History of passage through Parliament

Text of statute as originally enacted

The British Nationality (Irish Citizens) Act 2024 (c. 19) is an act of the Parliament of the United Kingdom which allows Irish citizens to no longer have to demonstrate their knowledge of English and be exempted from taking the Life in the UK test. They also pay a lower fee than naturalisation applicants. The act came into force on 22 July 2025. It is estimated to be relevant to 260,000 people, 31,000 of them in Northern Ireland.

==== Restricting Commonwealth free movement ====
All British subjects under the reformed system initially continued to hold free movement rights in both the UK and Ireland. Non-white immigration into the UK was systemically discouraged, but strong economic conditions in Britain following the Second World War attracted an unprecedented wave of colonial migration. This entitlement was part of a wider initiative to preserve close relationships with certain Dominions and colonies (Australia, Canada, New Zealand, South Africa, and Southern Rhodesia) and to moderate nationalist attitudes within the Commonwealth. In response, Parliament imposed immigration controls on any subjects originating from outside the British Islands with the Commonwealth Immigrants Act 1962. This restriction was somewhat relaxed by the Immigration Act 1971 for patrials, subjects whose parents or grandparents were born in the United Kingdom, which gave effective preferential treatment to white Commonwealth citizens. Ireland mirrored this restriction and limited free movement only to people born on the islands of Great Britain or Ireland. However, individuals born in the UK since 1983 are only British citizens if at least one parent is already a British citizen. The Irish regulation created a legal anomaly where persons born in Britain without British citizenship nevertheless held an unrestricted right to settle in Ireland; this inconsistency was removed in 1999.

In other parts of the Commonwealth, British subjects already did not have an automatic right to settle. Australia, Canada, New Zealand, and South Africa had immigration restrictions in place for British subjects from outside their jurisdictions targeted at non-white migrants since the late 19th century. After 1949, non-local British subjects under the new definition who were resident in these independent Commonwealth countries continued to retain certain privileges. This included eligibility to vote in elections, for preferred paths to citizenship, and for welfare benefits. British subjects were eligible to vote in New Zealand until 1975 and Australia until 1984 (though subjects on the electoral roll in that year are still eligible). In Canada, voting eligibility was revoked at the federal level in 1975, but not fully phased out in provinces until 2006. All Commonwealth citizens remain eligible to vote and stand for public office in the UK.

=== Post-imperial redefinition of nationality classes ===
By the 1970s and 1980s, most colonies of the British Empire had become independent and remaining ties to the United Kingdom had been significantly weakened. The UK updated its nationality law to reflect the more modest boundaries of its remaining territory and possessions with the British Nationality Act 1981. CUKCs were reclassified in 1983 into different nationality groups based on their ancestry, birthplace, and immigration status: CUKCs who had right of abode in the United Kingdom became British citizens while those connected with a remaining colony became British Dependent Territories citizens (BDTCs). Remaining CUKCs who were no longer associated with a British territory became British Overseas citizens. The definition of "British subject" became limited to include only the category of people previously called British subjects without citizenship who held that status through a connection with former British India or Ireland before 1949.

=== Former membership in the European Union ===
In 1973, the United Kingdom joined the European Communities (EC), a set of organisations that later developed into the European Union (EU). British citizens were able to work in other EC/EU countries under the freedom of movement for workers established by the 1957 Treaty of Rome and participated in their first European Parliament elections in 1979. With the creation of European Union citizenship by the 1992 Maastricht Treaty, free movement rights were extended to all nationals of EU member states regardless of their employment status. The scope of these rights was further expanded with the establishment of the European Economic Area in 1994 to include any national of an EFTA member state except for Switzerland, which concluded a separate free movement agreement with the EU that came into force in 2002.

Not all British nationals were EU citizens. Only British citizens, British Overseas Territories citizens connected with Gibraltar, and British subjects under the 1981 Act who held UK right of abode were defined as UK nationals for the purposes of EU law. Although the Crown dependencies were part of the European Union Customs Union, free movement of persons was never implemented in those territories. Following the UK's withdrawal from the EU on 31 January 2020, British nationals have no longer been EU citizens. Despite this, British citizens continue to have free movement in Ireland as part of the preexisting arrangement for the Common Travel Area.

While the UK was a member state of the EU, Cypriot and Maltese citizens held a particularly favoured status there. While non-EU Commonwealth citizens continued to need a residence visa to live in the UK, Cypriot and Maltese citizens were able to settle there and immediately hold full rights to political participation due to their status as both Commonwealth and EU citizens. This group of EU citizens (along with Irish citizens) domiciled in the UK were able to vote in the 2016 United Kingdom European Union membership referendum while all other non-British EU citizens could not.

== Acquisition and loss of nationality ==
The British Islands (the United Kingdom, the Isle of Man and the Channel Isles)

=== British citizenship ===
Prior to 1983, everyone born within the British Islands (the United Kingdom and Crown Dependencies) received British citizenship at birth regardless of the nationalities of their parents. Individuals born afterwards only receive citizenship at birth if at least one parent is a British citizen or considered to have settled status in the UK. Section 2 of the Act establishes that adults born overseas are British citizens by descent if either parent is a citizen otherwise than by descent, subject to regulations. Section 3 of the Act establishes also that minors may be entitled to be citizens by registration if a parent is a citizen by descent who lived in the UK for a period before the birth. Adopted children are treated as if they were naturally born to the adopting parents at the time of adoption. Children born abroad to members of the British Armed Forces or British citizens on Crown service are treated as if they were born in the UK.

Children born in the UK to a resident Irish citizen at any time are always British citizens at birth. Since 1983, the status of a child born in the UK is dependent on whether their parents held British citizenship or settled status at the time of their birth. Irish citizens residing in the UK are deemed to hold settled status upon arrival.

Regulations concerning settled status for other European Union (EU), European Economic Area (EEA) and Swiss citizens have changed greatly over time, affecting the status of their children born during the different regulatory periods. EU/EEA citizens living in the UK before 2 October 2000 were automatically considered to be settled. Between that date and 29 April 2006, EU/EEA citizens were required to apply for permanent residency. Swiss citizens became subject to the same regulations on 1 June 2002. From 30 April 2006 until 30 June 2021, EU/EEA and Swiss citizens living in the UK for at least five years automatically received permanent resident status. Permanent resident status for these citizens expired on 1 July 2021, after which they have been required to hold settled status through the European Union Settlement Scheme or another path.

Foreign nationals may naturalise as British citizens after residing in the UK for more than five years and possessing indefinite leave to remain (ILR) for at least one year. The residency requirement is reduced to three years if an applicant is married to a British citizen and they immediately become eligible for naturalisation after receiving ILR or equivalent. Applicants must demonstrate proficiency in the English, Welsh, or Scottish Gaelic languages and pass the Life in the United Kingdom test.

=== British by Descent or Otherwise than by Descent ===
British nationality can be classified as by descent or otherwise than by descent. Persons who are British otherwise than by descent can pass on British citizenship to their children born abroad. Generally, a person is considered to be British otherwise than by descent if they are a British citizen who was born or naturalized in the UK. Persons registered in the UK can be considered by descent or otherwise than by descent. For cases of registration, by descent status is layed out clearly in the relevant legislation. Person registered before 1983 are usually considered British otherwise than by descent as long as the registration occurred in the UK (note: this includes children of British mothers registered under s. 7 of the BNA 1948) and can thus pass on British citizenship to their children born abroad.

British citizenship by descent and otherwise than by descent under the British Nationality Act 1981
Section	Route to citizenship	Status
Section 1	Birth in the United Kingdom	Otherwise than by descent
Section 2(1)	Birth outside the United Kingdom to a British citizen parent	By descent
Section 3(2)	Registration of a child born abroad to a British citizen by descent	By descent
Section 3(5)	Registration of a child born abroad to a British citizen by descent following residence in the United Kingdom	Otherwise than by descent
Section 3(1)	Discretionary registration of a child	Depends on the basis of registration
Sections 4A	Registration under statutory entitlement provisions (overseas territory citizen)	Otherwise than by descent
Section 4C	Registration of persons born before 1983 to British mothers	By descent
Section 4D	Registration of certain children of members of the armed forces	Otherwise than by descent
Sections 4F, 4G, 4H, 4I and 4K	Registration correcting historical legislative unfairness	Depends on the status the person would have held but for the unfairness
Section 4L	Historical legislative unfairness/exceptional circumstances	Otherwise than by descent
Section 6	Naturalisation	Otherwise than by descent
Section 10	Resumption of citizenship after renunciation	Same status as before renunciation

Prior to 1983, civil connection with the UK was defined as citizenship of the United Kingdom and Colonies (CUKC). For persons who became British citizens upon the BNA 1981 coming into force the following table defines by descent or otherwise than by descent status.

British citizenship by descent and otherwise than by descent for persons who acquired citizenship before the British Nationality Act 1981
Pre-1983 provision	Route to citizenship	Status
British Nationality Act 1948, section 4	Birth in the United Kingdom and Colonies	Otherwise than by descent
British Nationality Act 1948, section 5	Citizenship of the United Kingdom and Colonies by descent	By descent
British Nationality Act 1948, section 12(1)	British subject by birth, annexation or naturalisation in the United Kingdom and Colonies before 1949	Otherwise than by descent
British Nationality Act 1948, section 12(2)	Descent from a father who became a CUKC under section 12(1)	By descent
British Nationality Act 1948, section 12(3)	Birth in a protectorate, protected state or United Kingdom trust territory before 1949	Otherwise than by descent
British Nationality Act 1948, section 12(4)	Residual acquisition of CUKC status by certain British subjects	By descent
British Nationality Act 1948, section 12(6)	Registration as a CUKC by descent	By descent
British Nationality Act 1948, section 13(2)	Certain British subjects without citizenship who became CUKCs	By descent
British Nationality Act 1948, paragraph 3 of Schedule 3	Transitional acquisition of CUKC status	By descent
British Nationality Act 1948, registration provisions	Registration as a CUKC for commonwealth citizens and children (s. 6 & 7)	Otherwise than by descent*
British Nationality Act 1948, naturalisation provisions	Naturalisation as a CUKC	Otherwise than by descent
British Nationality (No. 2) Act 1964, section 1(4)	Acquisition of CUKC status under the 1964 Act	By descent

*Note: some confusion exists surrounding status of by descent for children registered under S. 7 BNA 1948. If the child had a British mother and not a British father AND was registered at a CUKC between 1979-1982, they normally became British citizens OTBD on 1 January 1983.

=== British Overseas Territories citizenship ===
Individuals born in a territory automatically receive BOTC status if at least one parent is a BOTC or has belonger status. Children born in an overseas territory to British citizen parents who are not settled in a territory are British citizens at birth, but not BOTCs. Parents do not necessarily need to be connected with the same overseas territory to pass on BOTC status. Alternatively, a child born in an overseas territory may be registered as a BOTC if either parent becomes a BOTC or settles in any overseas territory subsequent to birth. A child who lives in the same territory until age 10 and is not absent for more than 90 days in each year is also entitled to registration as a BOTC. Furthermore, an adopted child automatically become a BOTC on the effective day of adoption if either parent is a BOTC or has belonger status. In all cases that an individual is a British Overseas Territories citizen at birth or adoption within the territories, that person is a BOTC otherwise than by descent.

Individuals born outside of the territories are BOTCs by descent if either parent is a BOTC otherwise than by descent. Unmarried fathers cannot automatically pass on BOTC status, and it would be necessary for them to register children as BOTCs. If a parent is a BOTC by descent, additional requirements apply to register children as BOTCs. Parents in Crown service who have children abroad are exempted from these circumstances, and their children would be BOTCs otherwise than by descent, as if they had been born on their home territory.

Foreigners and non-BOTC British nationals may naturalise as British Overseas Territories citizens after residing in a territory for more than five years and possessing belonger status or permanent residency for more than one year. The residency requirement is reduced to three years if an applicant is married to a BOTC. All applicants for naturalisation and registration are normally considered by the governor of the relevant territory, but the Home Secretary retains discretionary authority to grant BOTC status. Since 2004, BOTC applicants aged 18 or older are required to take an oath of allegiance to the Sovereign and loyalty pledge to the relevant territory during their citizenship ceremonies.

All British Overseas Territories citizens other than those solely connected with Akrotiri and Dhekelia became British citizens on 21 May 2002, and children born on qualified overseas territories to dual BOTC-British citizens since that date are both BOTCs and British citizens otherwise than by descent. Prior to 2002, only BOTCs from Gibraltar and the Falkland Islands were given unrestricted access to citizenship. BOTCs naturalised after that date may also become British citizens by registration at the discretion of the Home Secretary. Becoming a British citizen has no effect on BOTC status; BOTCs may also simultaneously be British citizens.

Following the Chagos Archipelago handover agreement, the British government is also due to introduce legislation to implement the agreement, including amending the British Nationality Act 1981 to reflect that the British Indian Ocean Territory is no longer an overseas territory following Parliament's ratification of the treaty.

=== Other nationality classes ===
It is generally not possible to acquire other forms of British nationality. British Overseas citizenship, British subjecthood, and British protected person status are only transferred by descent if an individual born to a parent holding one of these statuses would otherwise be stateless. British Overseas citizens retain their status by association with most former British colonies, British subjects are connected specifically with Ireland or British India before 1949, and British protected persons are associated with territories that were under British control but not formally incorporated as part of the British Empire. British National (Overseas) status was exclusively granted by voluntary registration to Hong Kong residents who had been British Dependent Territories citizens prior to the transfer of sovereignty to China in 1997 and cannot be newly acquired in any case. Noncitizen British nationals may become British citizens by registration, rather than naturalisation, after residing in the United Kingdom for more than five years and possessing ILR for more than one year.

=== Renunciation and restoration ===
Any type of British nationality can be renounced by making a declaration to the Home Secretary, provided that the declarant possesses or intends to acquire another nationality. Former British citizens or BOTCs may subsequently apply for nationality restoration. Applicants who had originally renounced their British nationality in order to retain or acquire another nationality are entitled to register as British citizens or BOTCs once. Any subsequent renunciation and application for restoration, or someone applying for restoration who originally renounced their British nationality for a reason unrelated to acquiring or retaining an alternate nationality, would be subject to the discretionary approval of the Home Secretary.

=== Automatic loss of British nationality ===
British subjects (other than British subjects by virtue of a connection with the Republic of Ireland) and British protected persons lose British nationality upon acquiring any other form of nationality.

- These provisions do not apply to British citizens.
- British Overseas Territories citizens (BOTCs) who acquire another nationality do not lose their BOTC status but they may be liable to lose belonger status in their home territory under its immigration laws. Such persons are advised to contact the governor of that territory for information.
- British Overseas citizens (BOCs) do not lose their BOC status upon acquisition of another citizenship, but any entitlement to registration as a British citizen on the grounds of having no other nationality no longer applies after acquiring another citizenship.

=== Deprivation of British nationality ===
The British government does not publish the number of people it strips of citizenship, but independent research by a lawyer-run website, in 2022, found at least 464 people's citizenships were revoked in the last 15 years.

After the Nationality, Immigration and Asylum Act 2002 came into force British nationals could be deprived of their citizenship if and only if the Secretary of State was satisfied they were responsible for acts seriously prejudicial to the vital interests of the United Kingdom or an Overseas Territory.

This was extended under the Immigration, Asylum and Nationality Act 2006: people with dual nationality who are British nationals can be deprived of their British citizenship if the Secretary of State is satisfied that "deprivation is conducive to the public good", or if nationality was obtained by means of fraud, false representation or concealment of a material fact. Between 2006 and the end of 2021 at least 464 people have had their citizenship removed by the government since the law was introduced. There is a right of appeal. This provision has been in force since 16 June 2006 when the Immigration, Nationality and Asylum Act 2006 (Commencement No. 1) Order 2006 brought it into force. Loss of British nationality in this way applies also to dual nationals who are British by birth. The Secretary of State may not deprive a person of British nationality, unless obtained by means of fraud, false representation or concealment of a material fact, if they are satisfied that the order would make a person stateless. (Note: This was to give effect to article 8(1) of the 1961 Convention on the Reduction of Statelessness.)

This provision was again modified by the Immigration Act 2014 so as not to require that a third country would actually grant nationality to a person; British nationality can be revoked if "the Secretary of State has reasonable grounds for believing that the person is able, under the law of a country or territory outside the United Kingdom, to become a national of such a country or territory."

The powers to strip citizenship were initially very rarely used. Between 2010 and 2015, 33 dual nationals had been deprived of their British citizenship. In the two years to 2013 six people were deprived of citizenship; then in 2013, 18 people were deprived, increasing to 23 in 2014. In 2017, over 40 people had been deprived as of July (at this time increased numbers of British citizens went to join the "Islamic State" and then tried to return).

The Home Office does not issue information on these cases and is resistant to answering questions, for example under the Freedom of Information Act 2000. It appears that the government usually waits until the person has left Britain, then sends a warning notice to their British home and signs a deprivation order a day or two later. Appeals are heard at the highly secretive Special Immigration Appeals Commission (SIAC), where the government can submit evidence that cannot be seen or challenged by the appellant.

Home Secretary Sajid Javid said in 2018 that until then deprivation of nationality had been restricted to "terrorists who are a threat to the country", but that he intended to extend it to "those who are convicted of the most grave criminal offences". The acting director of Liberty responded "The home secretary is taking us down a very dangerous road. ... making our criminals someone else's problem is ... the government washing its hands of its responsibilities ... Banishment belongs in the dark ages."

A Nationality and Borders Bill was introduced to the British House of Commons in July 2021, sponsored by the Home Office under Home Secretary Priti Patel. In November 2021, an amendment to the Bill was introduced which, if passed, would allow people to be deprived of British citizenship without being given notice. At the time the Home Office reiterated its position on citizenship: "British citizenship is a privilege, not a right".

== British citizenship ceremonies ==
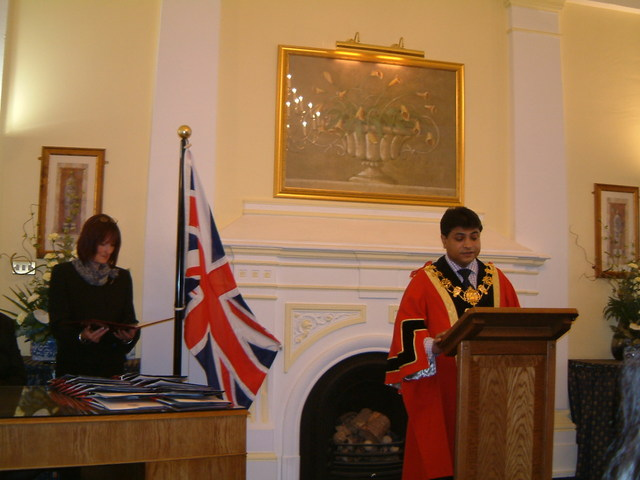
A British citizenship ceremony in the London Borough of Tower Hamlets, 2005

From 1 January 2004, all new applicants for British citizenship by naturalisation or registration aged 18 or over if their application is successful must attend a citizenship ceremony and either make an affirmation or take an oath of allegiance to the monarch, and make a pledge to the UK.

Citizenship ceremonies are normally organised by:

- local councils in England, Scotland and Wales
- the Northern Ireland Office
- the governments of the Isle of Man, Jersey and Guernsey
- the Governors of British Overseas Territories
- British consular offices outside the United Kingdom and territories.

Persons from what is now the Republic of Ireland born before 1949 reclaiming British subject status under section 31 of the 1981 Act do not need to attend a citizenship ceremony. If such a person subsequently applies for British citizenship by registration or naturalisation, attendance at a ceremony is required.

For those who applied for British citizenship before 2004:

- the oath of allegiance was administered privately through signing a witnessed form in front of a solicitor or other accredited person
- those who already held British nationality (other than British protected persons) were exempt, as were those citizens of countries with the British monarch as Head of State (such as Australia and Canada).

== See also ==
- Visa policy of the United Kingdom
- Visa requirements for British citizens
- Visa requirements for British Nationals (Overseas)
- Visa requirements for British Overseas citizens
- Visa requirements for British Overseas Territories citizens
