= Immigration and Asylum Act 1999 =

Act of the Parliament of the United Kingdom

Immigration and Asylum Act 1999 (Note: Section 170(1).)
- Act of Parliament
- Parliament of the United Kingdom
- Long title: An Act to make provision about immigration and asylum; to make provision about procedures in connection with marriage on superintendent registrar’s certificate; and for connected purposes.
- Citation: 1999 c. 33
- Territorial extent: England and Wales; Scotland; Northern Ireland (Note: Section 170(6).)

Dates
- Royal assent: 11 November 1999
- Commencement: Various (Note: Section 170(2)–(5).)
Other legislation
Amends	Marriages (Ireland) Act 1844; Marriage Law (Ireland) Amendment Act 1863; National Assistance Act 1948; Marriage Act 1949; Prison Act 1952; Parliamentary Commissioner Act 1967; Firearms Act 1968; Health Services and Public Health Act 1968; Social Work (Scotland) Act 1968; Family Law Reform Act 1969; Marriage (Registrar General's Licence) Act 1970; Immigration Act 1971; Health and Personal Social Services (Northern Ireland) Order 1972; House of Commons Disqualification Act 1975; Northern Ireland Assembly Disqualification Act 1975; Protection from Eviction Act 1977; National Health Service Act 1977; Housing (Northern Ireland) Order 1983; Mental Health (Scotland) Act 1984; Prosecution of Offences Act 1985; Immigration Act 1988; Courts and Legal Services Act 1990; Social Security Contributions and Benefits Act 1992; Social Security Contributions and Benefits (Northern Ireland) Act 1992; Judicial Pensions and Retirement Act 1993; Asylum and Immigration Appeals Act 1993; Asylum and Immigration Act 1996; Housing Act 1996; Education Act 1996; Special Immigration Appeals Commission Act 1997
Repeals/revokes	Immigration (Carriers' Liability) Act 1987
Amended by	Immigration (European Economic Area) Regulations 2000; Anti-terrorism, Crime and Security Act 2001; Postal Services Act 2000 (Consequential Modifications No. 1) Order 2001; State Pension Credit Act 2002; Tax Credits Act 2002; Homelessness Act 2002; Nationality, Immigration and Asylum Act 2002; Education Act 2002; State Pension Credit Act (Northern Ireland) 2002; Regulatory Reform (Carer’s Allowance) Order 2002; Asylum Support (Repeal) Order 2002; Mental Health (Care and Treatment) (Scotland) Act 2003; Agricultural Holdings (Scotland) Act 2003; Marriage (Northern Ireland) Order 2003; Asylum and Immigration (Treatment of Claimants, etc.) Act 2004; Civil Partnership Act 2004; Constitutional Reform Act 2005; Mental Health (Care and Treatment) (Scotland) Act 2003 (Consequential Provisions) Order 2005; Immigration, Asylum and Nationality Act 2006; Identity Cards Act 2006; National Health Service (Consequential Provisions) Act 2006; Welfare Reform Act 2007; Legal Services Act 2007; UK Borders Act 2007; Welfare Reform Act (Northern Ireland) 2007; Transfer of Functions (Asylum Support Adjudicators) Order 2007; Housing and Regeneration Act 2008; Health and Social Care Act 2008]; Transfer of Tribunal Functions Order 2008; Borders, Citizenship and Immigration Act 2009; Identity Documents Act 2010; Transfer of Tribunal Functions Order 2010; Transfer of Functions of the Asylum and Immigration Tribunal Order 2010; Housing and Regeneration Act 2008 (Consequential Provisions) Order 2010; Welfare Reform Act 2012; Northern Ireland Act 1998 (Devolution of Policing and Justice Functions) Order 2012; Crime and Courts Act 2013; Immigration Act 2014; Counter-Terrorism and Security Act 2015; Welfare Reform (Northern Ireland) Order 2015; Immigration Act 2016; Legal Complaints and Regulation Act (Northern Ireland) 2016; Data Protection Act 2018; Data Protection, Privacy and Electronic Communications (Amendments etc) (EU Exit) Regulations 2019; Immigration, Nationality and Asylum (EU Exit) Regulations 2019; Immigration and Social Security Co-ordination (EU Withdrawal) Act 2020 (Consequential, Saving, Transitional and Transitory Provisions) (EU Exit) Regulations 2020; Nationality and Borders Act 2022; Public Service Pensions and Judicial Offices Act 2022; Health and Social Care Act (Northern Ireland) 2022 (Consequential Amendments) Order 2022; Illegal Migration Act 2023; Border Security, Asylum and Immigration Act 2025; Employment Rights Act 2025
Relates to	Immigration and Asylum Act 1999 (Jersey) Order 2003; Immigration (Guernsey) Order 2011; Immigration (Jersey) Order 2012

Status: Amended

Text of statute as originally enacted

Revised text of statute as amended

The Immigration and Asylum Act 1999 (c. 33) is an act of the Parliament of the United Kingdom. It followed a 1998 government white paper entitled "Fairer, Faster And Firmer – A Modern Approach To Immigration And Asylum". Its main aim was to create a faster system to deal with a backlog of cases.

One of the most notable parts of the new law was to introduce the dispersal policy under section 95 of the act. This system allowed for the creation of dispersal areas around the United Kingdom, where asylum applicants would be accommodated while their claims for asylum were reviewed. The act provided for two types of accommodation, "initial accommodation", which was generally available for up to two weeks, and "dispersal" accommodation, which could be occupied for longer periods.
