= Andrew Sharpe, Baron Sharpe of Epsom =

British Conservative politician

The Right Honourable The Lord Sharpe of Epsom OBE
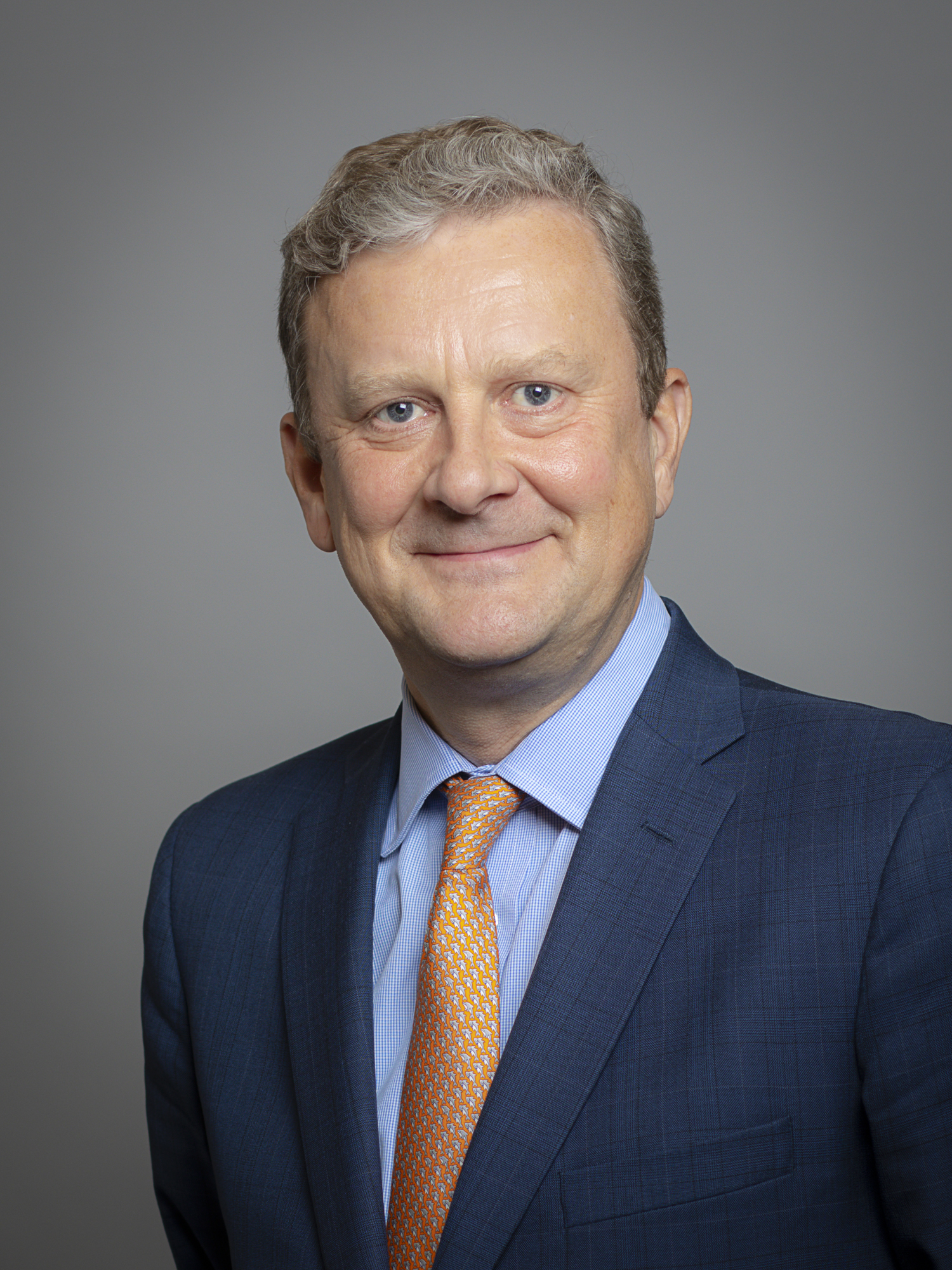
- Official portrait, 2020

Shadow Minister for Business and Trade
- Incumbent
- Assumed office 11 November 2024
- Leader: Kemi Badenoch

Shadow Minister for the Home Office
- In office 1 September 2024 – 10 November 2024
- Leader: Rishi Sunak; Kemi Badenoch

Parliamentary Under-Secretary of State for the Home Department
- In office 20 September 2022 – 5 July 2024
- Prime Minister: Liz Truss; Rishi Sunak
- Preceded by: The Baroness Williams of Trafford (as Minister of State)
- Succeeded by: The Lord Hanson of Flint

Lord-in-waiting Government Whip
- In office 8 October 2021 – 20 September 2022
- Prime Minister: Boris Johnson

Member of the House of Lords
- Lord Temporal
- Life peerage 15 September 2020

Personal details
- Born: Andrew Michael Gordon Sharpe; June 1965 (age 61)

Andrew Michael Gordon Sharpe, Baron Sharpe of Epsom, OBE (born June 1965) is an investment banker and British Conservative politician based in Surrey, who served as Parliamentary Under-Secretary of State in the Home Office from September 2022 to July 2024.

== Career ==
Sharpe was originally a policeman in Hong Kong between 1987 and 1991, before migrating to the UK in the early 1990s, where he began working as a merchant banker.

Sharpe was the President of the National Conservative Convention from 2017 to 2018 and was its Chairman until July 2021. Sharpe was also Vice Chair of the Policy Forum. He has worked to promote voluntary involvement in senior levels of the Conservative Party's organisation.

=== Parliamentary career ===
Sharpe was nominated for a Life Peerage in the 2020 Political Honours by Prime Minister Boris Johnson. He was created Baron Sharpe of Epsom on 15 September and introduced to the House of Lords on 12 October. He made his maiden speech on 16 December 2020. He was appointed to the front bench in October 2021 in Johnson's Reshuffle.

Prominently, Sharpe piloted the Illegal Migration Act 2023 and the Safety of Rwanda (Asylum and Immigration) Act 2024 through the Lords for the Government. He became a Shadow Home Office Minister in September 2024 and later a Shadow Business Minister in November of the same year.

Orders of precedence in the United Kingdom
Preceded by The Lord Sedwill	Life Peer; Baron Sharpe of Epsom	Followed by The Lord Lancaster of Kimbolton
