= Safety of Rwanda (Asylum and Immigration) Act 2024 =

Act of the Parliament of the United Kingdom

Safety of Rwanda (Asylum and Immigration) Act 2024 (Note: Section 11.)
- Act of Parliament
- Parliament of the United Kingdom
- Long title: An act to make provision about the removal of certain migrants to the Republic of Rwanda.
- Citation: 2024 c. 8
- Introduced by: James Cleverly, Home Secretary (Commons); The Lord Sharpe of Epsom, Parliamentary Under-Secretary of State for the Home Department (Lords)
- Territorial extent: England and Wales; Scotland; Northern Ireland; (Note: Section 9.)

Dates
- Royal assent: 25 April 2024
- Commencement: Not in force (Note: Section 10.)
- Repealed: 2 December 2025
Other legislation
Amends	UK Borders Act 2007; Illegal Migration Act 2023
Repealed by	Border Security, Asylum and Immigration Act 2025
Relates to	Immigration Act 1988; Asylum and Immigration (Treatment of Claimants, etc.) Act 2004; Immigration Act 2014

Status: Repealed

History of passage through Parliament

Text of statute as originally enacted

Revised text of statute as amended

The Safety of Rwanda (Asylum and Immigration) Act 2024 (c. 8) was an act of the Parliament of the United Kingdom. The act sought to deter unlawful migration, particularly by unsafe and illegal routes, by allowing some migrants to be sent to the Republic of Rwanda. It was introduced in the House of Commons on 7 December 2023, by James Cleverly, Home Secretary, passed its second reading on 12 December and passed its third reading on 17 January 2024.

The bill was introduced to the House of Lords by Lord Sharpe of Epsom, Parliamentary Under-Secretary of State for the Home Department, passed Committee Stage on 19 February 2024, and passed Report Stage on 6 March 2024. After its third reading in the Lords, the bill returned to the Commons for consideration of amendments, which took place on 18 March 2024. The government disagreed with all the Lords’ amendments.

After this, the bill returned to the Lords for consideration of Commons disagreements on 20 March 2024, where the Lords insisted on a number of amendments. The bill was then sent back and forth four times where it waited on Commons consideration of Lords amendments on 22 April 2024, and where the government vowed to disagree with the amendments. The bill returned to the Lords the same day for consideration of Commons disagreements. There was speculation about the double-insistence rule and its implications for the bill, including the use of the Parliament Acts.

Prime Minister, Rishi Sunak, vowed that Parliament would "sit day and night" until the Lords backed down on 22 April 2024. The bill had two extra rounds of Parliamentary ping-pong on 22 April 2024 and the Lords did not insist on their amendments in the early hours of 23 April 2024. The bill therefore passed both Houses of Parliament and received royal assent on 25 April 2024. The act was intended to come into force with the United Kingdom-Rwanda Asylum Partnership Treaty. In December 2025, it was repealed via the Border Security, Asylum and Immigration Act 2025.

== Background ==
The background to the act is the British Government's Rwanda asylum plan, under which it plans to send some migrants who would otherwise claim asylum in Britain to Rwanda and says it is a safe country for them. Despite legislative changes in the Illegal Migration Act 2023, which received royal assent on 20 July 2023, but was not in force at the time, a judgment of the Supreme Court of the United Kingdom on 15 November 2023 found that Rwanda is not safe, and the plan was unlawful, as migrants might be sent away from Rwanda to face persecution.

On 5 December 2023, the government signed a new treaty with Rwanda containing further safeguards over relocation. A significant change is that no one relocated to Rwanda could be sent on from there to another country, only back to Britain. The Rwanda policy does not mean that asylum-seekers would be held in Rwanda while their claims for asylum were determined in Britain. Their claims would be determined by Rwanda, and when claims were allowed the result would be that those concerned would remain in Rwanda.

In the act, Parliament has declared that Rwanda is to be treated as safe, believing that this will mean the relocation plan is lawful.

While the act disapplies some provisions of the Human Rights Act 1998, it avoids the more radical option of withdrawing from the European Convention on Human Rights altogether, which was opposed by the Rwandan government. Prime Minister Rishi Sunak subsequently stated that he would withdraw the UK from the ECHR if there were further challenges to stop deportations to Rwanda after the act was passed.

== Provisions ==
Section 1(1) states that the purpose of the act is to "prevent and deter unlawful migration, and in particular migration by unsafe and illegal routes". This repeats a section of the Illegal Migration Act 2023.

Section 1(2) refers to the recent treaty with Rwanda and states that the act gives effect to "the judgement of Parliament that the Republic of Rwanda is a safe country".

Section 1(3) summarises the treaty, setting out what has changed since an asylum partnership was agreed with Rwanda in April 2022.

Section 1(4)(a) recognises that Parliament is sovereign, repeating words in the European Union (Withdrawal Agreement) Act 2020.

Section 1(4)(b) states that international law does not override acts of the Parliament.

Section 1(5) defines the meaning of declaring that Rwanda is a safe country: namely, that removing someone to there is in compliance with all relevant international law.

Section 1(6) defines international law as including the treaties mentioned by the Supreme Court in its judgment, as well as customary international law and "any other international law... whatsoever".

Section 2 seeks to prohibit legal challenges based on the argument that Rwanda is unsafe. It instructs immigration officers and judges to treat Rwanda as safe when deciding whether or not to send people there:

Section 2(1) "Every decision-maker must conclusively treat the Republic of Rwanda as a safe country."

Section 2(3) is an ouster clause which prohibits a court or tribunal from hearing a legal challenge to a removal to Rwanda based on the safety of Rwanda.

Section 2(4) prohibits arguments that someone removed to Rwanda might be sent to another country and as a result face persecution

Section 3 disapplies most of the operative provisions of the Human Rights Act 1998, for certain specific purposes. Section 2 of that act requires that the courts "must take into account" the judgments and decisions of the European Court of Human Rights if relevant to proceedings.

Section 3(3) disapplies the Human Rights Act for the purpose of determining whether Rwanda is a safe country in respect of a decision to be taken under the Immigration acts. Where the question of the safeness of Rwanda arises in any such proceedings, courts and tribunals are not required to take account of any relevant ECHR case law, but are not prevented from doing so.

Section 3(4) disapplies section 3 of the Human Rights Act, which requires legislation to be interpreted compatibly with Convention rights "so far as it is possible to do so", in relation to the entire act; so that courts interpreting the legislation are not required to attempt to find a Convention- compliant reading of it.

Section 3(5) disapplies sections 6 to 9 of the Human Rights Act, in relation to:

- A decision to conclusively treat Rwanda as a safe country under section 2(1) of the act;
- A decision as to whether to grant interim relief, such as an injunction preventing removal, in a challenge to removal based on individual circumstances under section 4 of the act.
- A decision as to whether the person would face a real risk of serious and irreversible harm in a challenge to removal based on particular individual circumstances.

Section 6 of the Human Rights Act requires public authorities to act compatibly with European Convention rights. Sections 7, 8 and 9 give people the right to bring proceedings and get remedies in the courts of the United Kingdom, rather than having to go to the European Court of Human Rights. The act does not disapply other provisions of the Human Rights Act, leaving open the possibility of obtaining a declaration of incompatibility under section 4 of that act. The explanatory memorandum which is attached to the act states that the purpose of section 3 is "to make clear that the courts and tribunals should defer to Parliament’s sovereign view that Rwanda is safe country as defined, and are under no obligation that could conflict with this".

Section 4(1) qualifies the section 2 restrictions on challenges based on the safety of Rwanda, by providing that challenges based on the person's "particular individual circumstances" are still permitted, while requiring the person to provide compelling evidence in support of such a claim. A court or tribunal is not to grant an injunction suspending the person's removal while the challenge proceeds, unless there is a "real, imminent and foreseeable risk of serious and irreversible harm", and it is not allowed to entertain the argument that Rwanda is unsafe for that person because of the risk of being sent to another country to face possible persecution in breach of international law ("refoulement"). The question of safety based on individual circumstances must be confined to conditions in Rwanda itself.

Section 5 provides that where the European Court of Human Rights makes urgent orders called "interim measures" in proceedings concerning the removal of a person to Rwanda under the Immigration Acts, a minister can decide whether to comply. Courts and tribunals are therefore instructed to ignore such interim measures when considering an application or appeal.

Sections 6 to 10 mostly deal with routine technical issues common to most legislation, such as territorial extent. However, there are two which are significant.

Section 7(2) excludes Rwandan citizens from being removed to Rwanda, as a claim for asylum by such persons is likely to be based on alleged persecution by the Government of Rwanda.

Section 9 provides that if enacted the act would not come into force until the United Kingdom-Rwanda Asylum Partnership Treaty comes into force, when the internal ratification procedures of each country are complete.

== Parliamentary progress ==
The bill for the act was announced by James Cleverly on 6 December 2023 as emergency legislation, and was given a first reading in the House of Commons the next day. On 12 December, it was given a second reading in the Commons with a majority of 44, and with no Conservatives voting against, but some government supporters said they would be proposing amendments at the committee stage.

The One Nation grouping of Conservatives had recommended its members to vote for the act, and its chairman Damian Green said later "if the government sticks to its guns then it can probably get this legislation through intact".

Mark Francois, chairman of the European Research Group, was among the Conservatives who abstained, and commented "Our objection was that we don't believe as it's currently drafted the act is firm enough to ensure that flights will take off to Rwanda."

The bill was considered by a committee of the whole House on 16–17 January 2024 and passed its third reading in the Commons with a majority of 44. Eleven Conservative MPs voted against the bill, including former Home Secretary Suella Braverman and former immigration minister Robert Jenrick.

The two deputy chairmen of the Conservative Party, Lee Anderson and Brendan Clarke-Smith, both resigned their positions in order to support amendments designed to "toughen up" the act. Following the third reading in the Commons, The Independent reported that Sunak was "set for titanic battle" with the House of Lords over the bill. The act secured its second reading in the Lords on 29 January 2024 and had its third reading in the Lords on 12 March 2024.

== Reception ==
On 6 December 2023, Robert Jenrick resigned as immigration minister over "strong disagreements" with the government's response to problems with the Rwanda plan, stating that the act "does not go far enough".

Suella Braverman, dismissed as Home Secretary by Sunak three weeks before, following arguments which included the government policy on immigration, claimed the day after the bill was published that it "won't work".

Alasdair Mackenzie, a barrister active in the Rwanda litigation, has suggested that the prevention of judicial review in section 2(3) of the act could itself be judicially reviewed, to test the lawfulness of migrants being denied access to the courts. The outcome of this would depend on whether the courts maintained the orthodoxy that parliamentary sovereignty makes whatever Parliament enacts lawful or whether they agreed with some previous judgments that parliamentary sovereignty is not absolute.

In the Supreme Court judgment in R (Privacy International) v Investigatory Powers Tribunal, [2019] UKSC 22, Lord Carnwath said:

... it is ultimately for the courts, not the legislature, to determine the limits set by the rule of law to the power to exclude review.

Mark Elliott, Professor of Public Law at the University of Cambridge and former Legal Adviser to the House of Lords Constitution Committee, commented that "For a court to take the step implied in this comment, by holding, in effect, that Parliament had exceeded its authority by seeking to limit the courts' constitutional role, would be fraught with risk for the judiciary."

== Repeal ==
Repeal of the Safety of Rwanda (Asylum and Immigration) Act 2024 was included as Section 37 of the Border Security, Asylum and Immigration Bill, and Home Secretary Yvette Cooper confirmed that the government intended to repeal the Act. The bill was granted Royal Assent on 2 December 2025, and the repealing provision, by then numbered Section 40, came into force.
