= UK Borders Act 2007 =

Act of the Parliament of the United Kingdom

UK Borders Act 2007 (Note: Section 61(1).)
- Act of Parliament
- Parliament of the United Kingdom
- Long title: An Act to make provision about immigration and asylum; and for connected purposes.
- Citation: 2007 c. 30
- Introduced by: John Reid MP, Home Secretary (Commons); Baroness Scotland of Asthal, Minister of State, Home Office (Lords)
- Territorial extent: England and Wales; Scotland (in part); Northern Ireland; (Note: Section 60.)

Dates
- Royal assent: 30 October 2007
- Commencement: Various (Note: Section 59.)
Other legislation
Amends	Immigration Act 1971; Race Relations Act 1976; Immigration and Asylum Act 1999; Nationality, Immigration and Asylum Act 2002; Asylum and Immigration (Treatment of Claimants, etc.) Act 2004; Commissioners for Revenue and Customs Act 2005; Immigration, Asylum and Nationality Act 2006; Tribunals, Courts and Enforcement Act 2007
Amended by	Identity Documents Act 2010; Immigration Act 2014; Counter-Terrorism and Security Act 2015; Sentencing Act 2020; Nationality and Borders Act 2022; Illegal Migration Act 2023; Economic Crime and Corporate Transparency Act 2023; Safety of Rwanda (Asylum and Immigration) Act 2024; Border Security, Asylum and Immigration Act 2025; Sentencing Act 2026

Status: Amended

History of passage through Parliament

Text of statute as originally enacted

Revised text of statute as amended

The UK Borders Act 2007 (c. 30) is an act of the Parliament of the United Kingdom about immigration and asylum.

== Provisions ==
Amongst other things, it introduced compulsory biometric residence permits for non-EU immigrants and introduced greater powers for immigration control. It received Royal Assent on 30 October 2007 with sections 17 and 59 to 61 coming into force on that day.

The act established the UK Border Agency.

Among other provisions, the Act provides immigration officers with several police-like powers, such as detention, entry, search and seizure. It also created The Independent Chief Inspector of the UK Border Agency.

Section 32 of the act places a duty on the Secretary of State to make a deportation order in respect of a foreign criminal. A foreign criminal, as defined by the 2007 Act, is a person who is not a British citizen or Irish citizen, who has been convicted of an offence in the UK and sentenced to a period of imprisonment of at least 12 months. The duty to deport does not apply if there is an exception under section 33 of the 2007 Act.
