= United States congressional conference committee =

U.S. House and Senate committees formed to resolve disagreements on bills

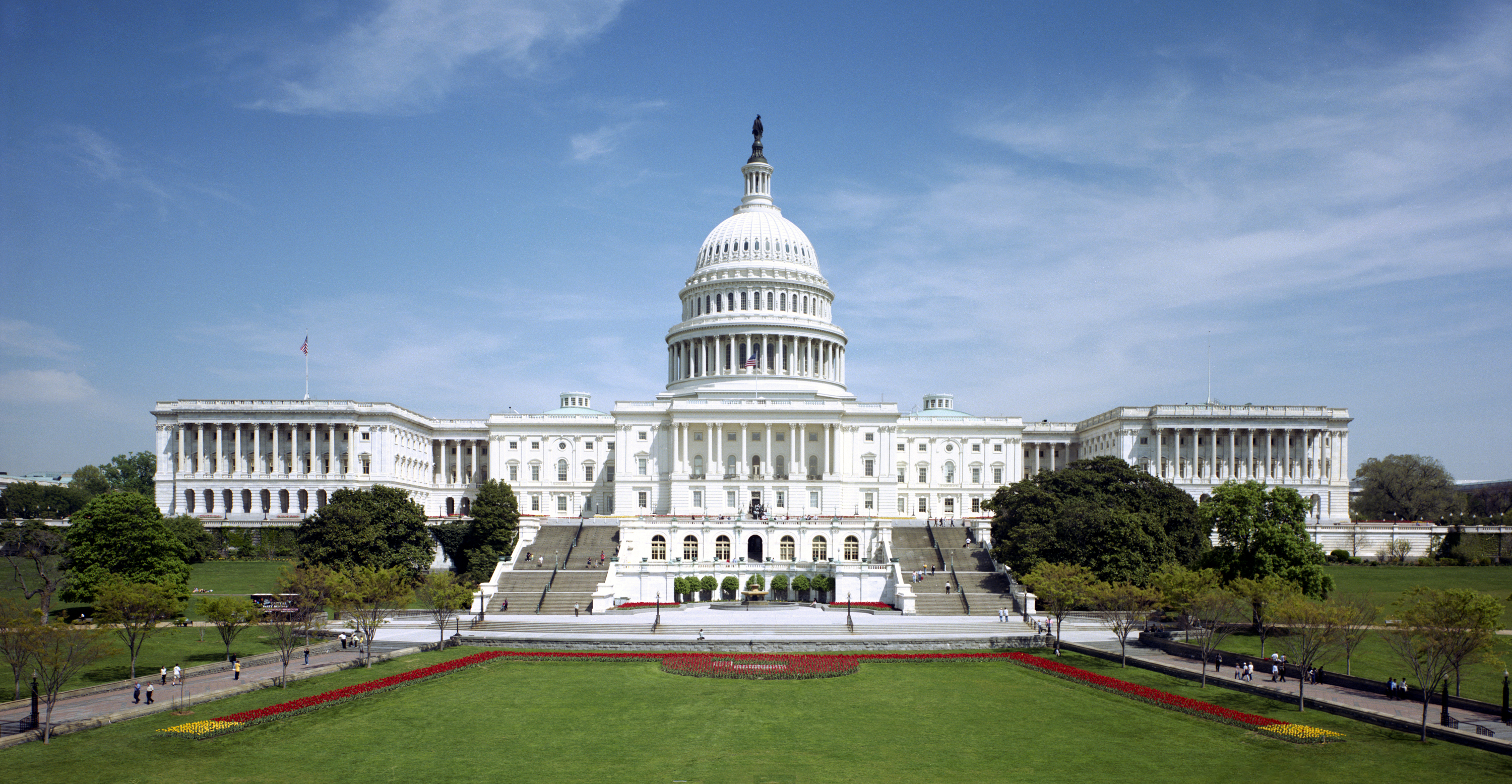
The United States Capitol, west front, with the Senate chamber on the left, and the House on the right.

A conference committee is a joint committee of the United States Congress appointed by the House of Representatives and Senate to resolve disagreements on a particular bill. A conference committee is usually composed of senior members of the standing committees of each house that originally considered the legislation.

The use of the conference committee process has steadily declined in recent decades. Sixty-seven conference reports were produced as recently as the 104th Congress (1995–97), falling to zero in the 117th Congress (2021–2023) and just one in the 118th Congress (2023–2025). There has been zero reports in the 119th Congress as of 4 November 2025.

== Going to conference ==
Conference committees operate after the House and the Senate have passed different versions of a bill. Conference committees exist to draft a compromise bill that both houses can accept. Both houses of Congress must pass identical legislation in order for a bill to be presented to the president. The two houses can reach that point through the process of amendments between Houses, where the House passes the Senate bill with a House amendment, or vice versa, but this process can be cumbersome. Thus, some bills pass both Houses through the use of a conference committee.

After one house passes a bill, the second house often passes the same bill, with an amendment representing the second house's work product. The second house then sends a message to the first house, asking the first house to concur with the second house's amendment. If the first house does not like the second house's amendment, then the first house can disagree with the amendment of the second house, request a conference, appoint conferees, and send a message to that effect to the second house. The second house then insists on its amendment, agrees to a conference, and appoints conferees.

Each house determines the number of conferees from its house. The number of conferees need not be equal. To conclude its business, a majority of both House and Senate delegations to the conference must indicate their approval by signing the conference report.

The authority to appoint conferees lies in the entire House, and the entire Senate appoints conferees by adopting a debatable motion to do so, but leadership have increasingly exercised authority in the appointment of conferees.

The House and Senate may instruct conferees, but these instructions are not binding.

== Authority ==
Conference committees can be extremely contentious, particularly if the houses are controlled by different parties. House rules require that one conference meeting be open to the public, unless the House, in open session, votes to close a meeting to the public. Apart from this one open meeting, conference committees usually meet in private, and are dominated by the chairs of the House and Senate committees.

House and Senate rules forbid conferees from inserting in their report matter not committed to them by either House. But conference committees sometimes do introduce new matter. In such a case, the rules of each House let a member object through a point of order, though each House has procedures that let other members vote to waive the point of order. The House provides a procedure for striking the offending provision from the bill. Formerly, the Senate required a senator to object to the whole bill as reported by the conference committee. If the objection was well-founded, the presiding officer ruled, and a senator could appeal the ruling of the chair. If the appeal was sustained by a majority of the Senate, it had precedential effect, eroding the rule on the scope of conference committees. From fall 1996 through 2000, the Senate had no limit on the scope of conference reports, and some argued that the majority abused the power of conference committees. In December 2000, the Senate reinstated the prohibition of inserting matters outside the scope of conference. The rule changed again with the Honest Leadership and Open Government Act, enacted in September 2007. Now any single senator may raise a point of order against subject matter newly inserted by the conference committee without objecting to the rest of the bill. Proponents of the measure may move to waive the rule. The affirmative vote of 60 senators is required to waive the rule. If the point of order is not waived and the chair rules that the objection is well-founded, only the offending provision is stricken from the measure, and the Senate votes on sending the balance of the measure back to the House.

== Conference report ==
Most times, the conference committee produces a conference report melding the work of the House and Senate into a final version of the bill. A conference report proposes legislative language as an amendment to the bill committed to conference. The conference report also includes a joint explanatory statement of the conference committee. This statement provides one of the best sources of legislative history on the bill. Chief Justice William Rehnquist once observed that the joint conference report of both Houses of Congress is considered highly reliable legislative history when interpreting a statute.

Once a bill has been passed by a conference committee, it goes directly to the floor of both houses for a vote, and is not open to further amendment. In the first house to consider the conference report, a member may move to recommit the bill to the conference committee. But once the first house has passed the conference report, the conference committee is dissolved, and the second house to act can no longer recommit the bill to conference.

Conference reports are privileged. In the Senate, a motion to proceed to a conference report is not debatable, although senators can generally filibuster the conference report itself. The Congressional Budget Act of 1974 limits debate on conference reports on budget resolutions and budget reconciliation bills to ten hours in the Senate, so senators cannot filibuster those conference reports.

The conference report must be approved by both the House and the Senate before the final bill is sent to the president.

== Declining use ==
The use of the formal conference process has steadily declined in recent decades. The number of conference reports produced is shown below from the 104th Congress (1995–97) through the 118th Congress (2023-2025) as of 21 November 2024:

== See also ==
- Parliamentary ping-pong
- Formal trilogue meeting
