= Asylum and Immigration Tribunal =

United Kingdom tribunal

The Asylum and Immigration Tribunal (AIT) was a tribunal constituted in the United Kingdom with jurisdiction to hear appeals from many immigration and asylum decisions. It was created on 4 April 2005, replacing the former Immigration Appellate Authority (IAA), and fell under the administration of the Tribunals Service.

On 15 February 2010, the Tribunal was abolished and its functions transferred to the new Asylum and Immigration Chamber of the First-tier Tribunal created by the Tribunals, Courts and Enforcement Act 2007.

The Special Immigration Appeals Commission (SIAC) has been set up to hear appeals against removal of potential deportees in high security cases. The information given to appellants and their representatives is limited as compared to other removal hearings.

== History ==
=== Origins ===
The system of appeals to adjudicators (who were appointed by the Secretary of State) with the right of subsequent appeal to the Immigration Appeal Tribunal (IAT) (whose members were appointed by the Lord Chancellor) was first created by the Immigration Appeals Act 1969 (1969 c.21).

=== The IAA ===
The predecessor of the AIT, the Immigration Appellate Authority (IAA), was an independent judicial body in the United Kingdom constituted under the Immigration Act 1971. It consisted of two tiers:Immigration Adjudicators and the Immigration Appeal Tribunal (IAT).

Immigration Adjudicators considered appeals against decisions made by Immigration Officers, entry clearance officers and the Home Secretary, with permanent centres in Islington in inner London, Hatton Cross, Birmingham, Leeds, Manchester and Glasgow.

The IAT dealt with applications for leave to appeal and appeals against decisions made by the Immigration Adjudicators, the main hearing centre was in Bream's Buildings, just off Chancery Lane, in Central London.

=== The creation of the AIT ===
The Asylum and Immigration (Treatment of Claimants, etc.) Act 2004 abolished the two tier structure and created a single tier tribunal. All former adjudicators and members of the IAA became members of the new AIT. At this point, the Home Office Adjudicators became known as Immigration Judges, although many of these are not officially qualified as judges, and the former regional adjudicators became Senior Immigration Judges, who are mostly involved in reconsideration applications for previously dismissed appeals.

== Procedure ==
At hearings, asylum seekers and would-be immigrants are usually, but not invariably, represented by legal representatives including barristers, advocates, solicitors, and those registered with the Office of the Immigration Service Commissioner. The UK government is usually represented by Home Office Presenting Officers ("HOPOs"); specially trained Civil Servants. For some significant cases, the Home Office instructs a barrister from TSol to conduct the case.

Procedure is governed by the Asylum and Immigration Tribunal (Procedure) Rules 2005 (SI 2005/230).

== Further appeals ==
Ordinarily, there is no right to appeal a decision of the AIT.

The AIT makes most initial decisions through a single immigration judge. Such decisions can be "reconsidered". An order for reconsideration is sought by making a written request to the High Court in England and Wales or the Court of Session (Outer House) in Scotland. For an indefinite period requests for reconsideration orders will be considered initially by Immigration judges of the AIT ("the filter"); should the request be refused a party can opt into the High Court or Court of Session.

Either of the parties (the Home Secretary or the Appellant) can apply for reconsideration, within strict time limits (for example, 5 days from receipt of the decision if the Appellant is in the UK). Such an application must be made in writing. A Senior Immigration Judge considers whether or not the grounds for reconsideration are "arguable". The only matters which can be considered are errors of law. A party cannot say that he seeks a re-hearing of the facts or that the factual conclusions reached by the Immigration Judge are wrong. He can only seek reconsideration if the Immigration Judge has misdirected himself in law, failed to consider relevant material, considered irrelevant material, or erred in his fact-finding to the extent that the findings are irrational and therefore amount to an error of law.

If permission is refused on the papers, the party may renew his application for an order for reconsideration to the High Court or Court of Session. Again, the time limits are short. If the High Court or Court of Sessions agree that the AIT has made a mistake in not considering the application for reconsideration, he may order the AIT to reconsider.

A successful application comes before the AIT for reconsideration. Most of these cases are heard at the old IAT, at Field House, Bream's Buildings, just off Chancery Lane in central London. Some are heard elsewhere. The initial hearing is a first-stage reconsideration, usually called an "error of law hearing" by lawyers and Immigration Judges. The panel of Immigration Judges (usually one legally-qualified Senior Immigration Judge and one or two lay members) determine whether a material error of law was made in the determination (judgment). If they conclude that no error was made, that is the end of the matter in front of the AIT. If they conclude that there was a material error of law, they may either reconsider the case in full or in part themselves, or (more usually) order that it be re-heard at a later date. They may set out that all the case be re-considered, or only part of it, depending on the exact circumstances. The second-stage reconsideration may be heard by three Immigration Judges, or by a single Immigration Judge.

After a re-hearing, or if the AIT which hears a case for the first time has a 3 or more members, the decision may only be challenged by an appeal to the Court of Appeal (Civil Division) in England and Wales, or the Court of Session (Inner House) in Scotland. Permission is required for such an appeal either from the Tribunal itself or the relevant court.

== See also ==
- Immigration to the United Kingdom
- Special Immigration Appeals Commission
- Office of the Immigration Services Commissioner
