= Anti-terrorism, Crime and Security Act 2001 =

Act of the Parliament of the United Kingdom

Anti-terrorism, Crime and Security Act 2001 (Note: Section 129.)
- Act of Parliament
- Parliament of the United Kingdom
- Long title: An Act to amend the Terrorism Act 2000; to make further provision about terrorism and security; to provide for the freezing of assets; to make provision about immigration and asylum; to amend or extend the criminal law and powers for preventing crime and enforcing that law; to make provision about the control of pathogens and toxins; to provide for the retention of communications data; to provide for implementation of Title VI of the Treaty on European Union; and for connected purposes.
- Citation: 2001 c. 24
- Introduced by: David Blunkett
- Territorial extent: United Kingdom (except parts 5 and 12 (not Scotland), section 100 (not Northern Ireland); British Overseas Territories (sections 50–56); (Note: Section 128.)

Dates
- Royal assent: 14 December 2001
- Commencement: 14 December 2001 – 7 July 2002 (Note: Section 127.)
Other legislation
Amends	Public Bodies Corrupt Practices Act 1889; Prevention of Corruption Act 1906; Prevention of Corruption Act 1916; Special Constables Act 1923; Emergency Laws (Re-enactments and Repeals) Act 1964; Nuclear Installations Act 1965; Police (Scotland) Act 1967; Firearms Act 1968; Finance Act 1968; Atomic Energy Authority Act 1971; Immigration Act 1971; Biological Weapons Act 1974; Legal Aid, Advice and Assistance (Northern Ireland) Order 1981; Civil Aviation Act 1982; Aviation Security Act 1982; Police and Criminal Evidence Act 1984; Public Order Act 1986; Ministry of Defence Police Act 1987; Public Order (Northern Ireland) Order 1987; Police and Criminal Evidence (Northern Ireland) Order 1989; Intelligence Services Act 1994; Criminal Justice and Public Order Act 1994; Chemical Weapons Act 1996; Police Act 1996; Special Immigration Appeals Commission Act 1997; Crime and Disorder Act 1998; Access to Justice Act 1999; Immigration and Asylum Act 1999; Terrorism Act 2000; Powers of Criminal Courts (Sentencing) Act 2000; See § Repealed enactments
Amended by	List: Justice (Northern Ireland) Act 2002; Police Reform Act 2002; Enterprise Act 2002; Nationality, Immigration and Asylum Act 2002; Aviation (Offences) Act 2003; Railways and Transport Safety Act 2003; Communications Act 2003; Crime (International Co-operation) Act 2003; Health and Social Care (Community Health and Standards) Act 2003; Criminal Justice Act 2003; Access to Justice (Northern Ireland) Order 2003; Nationality, Immigration and Asylum Act 2002 (Consequential and Incidental Provisions) Order 2003; Asylum and Immigration (Treatment of Claimants, etc.) Act 2004; Energy Act 2004; Companies (Audit, Investigations and Community Enterprise) Act 2004; Pensions Act 2004; Criminal Justice (Northern Ireland) Order 2004; Prevention of Terrorism Act 2005; Constitutional Reform Act 2005; Commissioners for Revenue and Customs Act 2005; Serious Organised Crime and Police Act 2005; Companies (Audit, Investigations and Community Enterprise) (Northern Ireland) Order 2005; Equality Act 2006; Terrorism Act 2006; Immigration, Asylum and Nationality Act 2006; National Health Service (Consequential Provisions) Act 2006; Armed Forces Act 2006; Police and Criminal Evidence (Amendment) (Northern Ireland) Order 2007; Schedule 5 to the Anti-terrorism, Crime and Security Act 2001 (Modification) Order 2007; Statute Law (Repeals) Act 2008; Counter-Terrorism Act 2008; Energy Act 2008; Legislative Reform (Health and Safety Executive) Order 2008; Companies Act 2006 (Consequential Amendments, Transitional Provisions and Savings) Order 2009; Bribery Act 2010; Postal Services Act 2011; Energy Act 2011; Treaty of Lisbon (Changes in Terminology) Order 2011; Protection of Freedoms Act 2012; Legal Aid, Sentencing and Punishment of Offenders Act 2012; Financial Services Act 2012; Schedule 5 to the Anti-terrorism, Crime and Security Act 2001 (Modification) Order 2012; Energy Act 2013; Police and Fire Reform (Scotland) Act 2012 (Consequential Provisions and Modifications) Order 2013; Local Audit and Accountability Act 2014; Anti-social Behaviour, Crime and Policing Act 2014; Immigration Act 2014; Public Bodies (Merger of the Director of Public Prosecutions and the Director of Revenue and Customs Prosecutions) Order 2014; Infrastructure Act 2015; Investigatory Powers Act 2016; Policing and Crime Act 2017; Criminal Finances Act 2017; Data Protection Act 2018; EEA Passport Rights (Amendment, etc., and Transitional Provisions) (EU Exit) Regulations 2018; Data Protection, Privacy and Electronic Communications (Amendments etc) (EU Exit) Regulations 2019; Law Enforcement and Security (Amendment) (EU Exit) Regulations 2019; Sentencing Act 2020; Financial Services Act 2021; Criminal Justice Act 2003 (Commencement No. 33) and Sentencing Act 2020 (Commencement No. 2) Regulations 2022; Economic Crime and Corporate Transparency Act 2023; Judicial Review and Courts Act 2022 (Magistrates' Court Sentencing Powers) Regulations 2023; National Security Act 2023 (Consequential Amendments of Primary Legislation) Regulations 2023; Retained EU Law (Revocation and Reform) Act 2023 (Consequential Amendment) Regulations 2023
Relates to	Proceeds of Crime Act 2002; Crime (International Co-operation) Act 2003

Status: Amended

Text of statute as originally enacted

Revised text of statute as amended

The Anti-terrorism, Crime and Security Act 2001 (c. 24) is an act of the Parliament of the United Kingdom, formally introduced on 19 November 2001, two months after the terrorist attacks in the United States on 11 September. The act received royal assent and came into force on 14 December 2001. Many of its measures are not specifically related to terrorism, and a Parliamentary committee was critical of the swift timetable for such a long bill including non-emergency measures.

The act was widely criticized, with one commentator describing it as "the most draconian legislation Parliament has passed in peacetime in over a century". On 16 December 2004, the Law Lords ruled that Section 23 was incompatible with the European Convention on Human Rights, but under the terms of the Human Rights Act 1998 it remained in force. It has since been replaced by the Prevention of Terrorism Act 2005.

== Part 1 (Terrorist property) ==
Sections 1–3, along with schedules 1 and 100, applied to the finances of suspected terrorists and terrorist organizations. Parliament rewrote parts of the Terrorism Act 2000 relating to seizure of suspected terrorist assets.

== Part 2 (Freezing orders) ==
This part re-enacted and widened provisions of the Emergency Laws (Re-enactments and Repeals) Act 1964, which in themselves dated from the Defence (General) Regulations 1939.

=== Usage against Iceland ===
In October 2008, prime minister Gordon Brown invoked this part of the Act within the Landsbanki Freezing Order 2008 to freeze the British assets of Icelandic bank Landsbanki during the Icelandic financial crisis, by virtue of the fact that the Treasury reasonably believed that "action to the detriment of the United Kingdom's economy (or part of it) has been or is likely to be taken by a person or persons".

Unless explicitly stated, the short title of an Act does not limit the powers expressed within it. The Act does not say "terrorism-related action to the detriment of the United Kingdom's economy". Indeed, the government had defeated attempts to restrict Part 2 to terrorism-related cases during the passage of the Bill through the House of Lords. The long title of the Act lists "to provide for the freezing of assets" as a separate item from "To amend the Terrorism Act 2000; to make further provision about terrorism and security".

Iceland's prime minister Geir Haarde protested against what he described "a terrorist law ... being applied against us", calling it "a completely unfriendly act".

== Part 3 (Disclosure of information) ==
This part gives new powers to Her Majesty's Customs and Excise and Inland Revenue (now merged into His Majesty's Revenue and Customs) to permit them to disclose information "for law enforcement purposes". It also clarifies the existing requirements to disclose information for criminal investigations, particularly in relation to confidential information held by public bodies.

== Part 4 (Immigration and asylum) ==
Part 4 allowed for the Home Secretary to certify any non-British citizen whom he suspected to be a terrorist and detain them indefinitely, pending deportation, even when such a deportation would be prohibited. The Law Lords ruled against the law in a case brought by nine of the detained suspected terrorists on 16 December 2004 (by issuing against it a declaration of incompatibility with the European Convention on Human Rights, as provided in the Human Rights Act 1998). The measure was effectively abolished the following March when it was up for review. Its powers were replaced with "control orders", brought in by the Prevention of Terrorism Act 2005.

=== Implementation ===
The Immigration Act 1971 allows for the deportation of those who are a threat to national security for cases where there is insufficient admissible evidence for prosecution; however, a ruling by the European Court of Human Rights in the case of Chahal v United Kingdom in 1996 ruled that deportation of persons to another country was not allowed if there were substantial grounds for believing that the person would be subjected to torture. As a result, the government argued that this provision was necessary to overcome this conjunction of legal and security problems, and allow indefinite detention without charge or trial.

Since this measure was known to step beyond the bounds of Article 5 of the ECHR, the government included section 30 to allow for a derogation (an opt out), claiming that since there was a "state of emergency threatening the life of the nation" (just one interpretation of the war on terror) which allowed it to do this. The Special Immigration Appeals Commission was to oversee the process.

The derogation order came into force on 13 November 2001, and was repealed on 8 April 2005. Between those dates the government claimed that there existed in the United Kingdom a state of public emergency threatening the life of the nation, within the meaning of Article 15(1) of the ECHR.

This part was renewed by Parliament on 3 March 2003 without a vote, and on 3 March 2004 with a vote.

=== Cases ===
Between 2001 and 2003 sixteen foreign nationals were detained and held using these powers at HM Prison Belmarsh. Eight were detained in December 2001, one in February 2002, two in April 2002, one in October 2002, one in November 2002, two in January 2002 and one in October 2003. One further individual was certified but detained under other powers. Of the total detained, two voluntarily left the United Kingdom. The other fourteen remained in detention as of 18 November 2003. The Council of Europe reported in a document dated 23 July 2004 that according to information supplied to their delegation by the authorities, in March 2004, there were fourteen persons certified as suspected international terrorists and deprived of their liberty in the United Kingdom. Twelve of them were detained exclusively under Part 4 of the Anti-Terrorism, Crime and Security Act 2001, of whom half since December 2001.

=== Appeals ===
The Act did provide a process for appealing to a judicial tribunal against the Home Secretary's decision to detain in each case. However, the government had argued that a special appellate process was needed to deal with these appeals because of the possibility that much of the evidence or information upon which the Home Secretary's suspicions may be based was likely to be sensitive information of a confidential nature whose release to the person detained or the public might compromise intelligence methods, operatives, and other persons. Therefore, the process established by the ATCSA involved special rules of evidence which most notably permitted the exclusion of the detainees and their legal representatives from proceedings. In an attempt to ensure that their rights were safeguarded at these times, security-vetted "special advocates" were appointed in the place of their legal representatives. However, there is some evidence that these special advocates experienced difficulties effectively protecting their interests, and two of the special advocates subsequently resigned from their positions following the December 2004 ruling of the House of Lords.

In October 2002 the Special Immigration Appeals Commission decided that the Home Secretary's derogation was lawful, and that there was indeed a "state of emergency threatening the life of the nation".

A series of legal challenges were made in respect of the powers and processes established under the ATCSA and on 16 December 2004, the Law Lords ruled that the powers of detention conferred by Part 4 of ATCSA were incompatible with the UK's obligations under the European Convention on Human Rights. The Court ruled by a majority of 8–1 that the purported derogation was not authorised by Article 15 of the European Convention on Human Rights since the measures taken could not rationally be held to be "strictly required by the exigencies of the situation", and were also discriminatory contrary to Article 14 of the Convention.

The ruling could be summed up as follows:

- No detention pending deportation had lasted for more than seven days, let alone three years.
- The law was unjustifiably discriminatory. What if a British citizen was also suspected of terrorism which required that they be detained indefinitely without trial? There was no way to do it.
- There was no observable state of emergency threatening the life of the nation. No other European country which had experienced far more severe crises had declared such a state of emergency over such a long time period.

The Court quashed the order derogating from the UK's obligations under the Convention, and issued a declaration pursuant to section 4 of the Human Rights Act 1998 that the provisions of the ATCSA which empowered the preventative detention of non-British suspected international terrorists were incompatible with the European Convention. The effect of such a declaration in British law is not to deprive the legislation of legal effect, and Parliament may, if it wishes, refuse to repeal or amend any provision declared to be incompatible. However the making of a declaration of incompatibility carries strong moral force, and creates considerable political pressure to address the incompatibility.

=== Replacement of Part 4 ===
To this end Part 4 of the ATCSA was replaced by the Prevention of Terrorism Act 2005 in March 2005. This act replaces detention in prison with "control orders" which allow for the imposition of an extensive and non-exhaustive set of conditions on the movements of the suspected person with restrictions approaching a form of house arrest.

Unlike Part 4 of the ATCSA, the powers in the Prevention of Terrorism Act 2005 can be applied to British and non-British suspected terrorists alike. At the time of its enactment there was considerable debate as to the compatibility of this Act's provisions with domestic and international human rights laws.

Eleven control orders were issued on the night the act passed on 11 March 2005 against the terrorist suspects who were due to be released. By October of that year only three were still in force.

== Part 5 (Racial hatred) ==
This part substitutes "racially aggravated" with "racially or religiously aggravated" in some parts of the criminal law.

== Parts 6–8 (Weapons of mass destruction) ==
These parts make it illegal to deal in biological or chemical weapons, or set off a nuclear explosion. They also make it illegal to disclose information "which might prejudice the security of any nuclear site or of any nuclear material".

== Part 9 (Aircraft security) ==
This part allows for the Secretary of State to make new regulations, and for the detention of aircraft where there is suspicion of an act of violence against a person on the aircraft.

== Part 10 (Police powers) ==
This part allows the police to forcefully obtain fingerprints and other identifying features from an individual to ascertain their identity, and for the Ministry of Defence Police to operate as police officers outside of their normal MOD property jurisdiction in relation to non-MOD crime in certain circumstances as defined by the statute. It also allows members of the British Transport Police to operate as police officers outside of their "natural jurisdiction" (mainly the railways) in certain circumstances as defined by the statute.

== Part 11 (Retention of communications data) ==
This part creates wide powers for the Secretary of State to regulate telephone companies and internet providers to retain data for the purpose of national security.

== Part 12 (Bribery and corruption) ==
This part extends the laws against bribery to cases where "functions of the person who receives or is offered a reward have no connection with the United Kingdom and are carried out in a country or territory outside the United Kingdom". It extends the laws against corruption so as to make prosecutions possible if "the act would, if done in the United Kingdom, constitute a corruption offence". The definitions of corruption offences are in Public Bodies Corrupt Practices Act 1889 and Prevention of Corruption Act 1906.

The Serious Fraud Office conducted an investigation into the Al-Yamama contract on the back of this strengthened legislation from late 2003 until 14 December 2006 when it was suddenly discontinued.

== Part 13 (Miscellaneous) ==
This part gives the Secretary of State the power to implement the Police and Judicial Co-operation in Criminal Matters section of the Maastricht Treaty.

== Part 14 (Supplemental) ==
This part outlines the timetable for the review of the Act by the independent reviewer of terrorism legislation.

=== Repealed enactments ===
Section 125 of the act repealed 13 enactments, listed in schedule 8 to the act.

Citation	Short title	Extent of repeal
Part 1: Terrorist property
1999 c. 22	Access to Justice Act 1999	In Schedule 2, in paragraph 2(2), the "or" at the end of paragraph (b), and in paragraph 2(3) the "or" at the end of paragraph (i).
2000 c. 11	Terrorism Act 2000	Sections 24 to 31.
2000 c. 11	Terrorism Act 2000	In section 122, the entries for "Authorised officer" and "Cash".
Part 2: Freezing orders (Note: These repeals have effect subject to section 16(2) of the act.)
1964 c. 60	Emergency Laws (Re-enactments and Repeals) Act 1964	Section 2.
1964 c. 60	Emergency Laws (Re-enactments and Repeals) Act 1964	In section 7(1) the words ", and any general direction given under section 2 of this Act,".
1964 c. 60	Emergency Laws (Re-enactments and Repeals) Act 1964	In section 14(1) and (2) the words "or direction" and ", section 2".
1968 c. 44	Finance Act 1968	Section 55.
Part 3: Immigration and asylum
1999 c. 33	Immigration and Asylum Act 1999	In section 143, subsections (3) to (8) and (14).
Part 4: Race and religion (Note: This repeal and this revocation have effect subject to section 42 of the act.)
1986 c. 64	Public Order Act 1986	In section 17 the words "in Great Britain".
SI 1987/463 (N.I. 7)	Public Order (Northern Ireland) Order 1987	In Article 8, in the definition of fear and the definition of hatred, the words "in Northern Ireland".
Part 5: Civil nuclear security
1965 c. 57	Nuclear Installations Act 1965	In Schedule 1, paragraphs 5 and 6.
1976 c. 23	Atomic Energy Authority (Special Constables) Act 1976	Section 3.
1976 c. 23	Atomic Energy Authority (Special Constables) Act 1976	In section 4(2), the definitions of "specified body corporate" and "designated company".
Part 6: Police powers
1962 c. xlii	British Transport Commission Act 1962	Section 43(3).
1987 c. 4	Ministry of Defence Police Act 1987	In section 2, subsection (2)(d), in subsection (3), the words ", but only" and, in subsection (4), the words "as they have effect in the United Kingdom".
1994 c. 33	Criminal Justice and Public Order Act 1994	In section 60, subsection (4A) and, in subsection (8), paragraph (b) and the word "or" immediately preceding it.
1998 c. 37	Crime and Disorder Act 1998	Section 25(1).
Part 7: Miscellaneous
2000 c. 11	Terrorism Act 2000	In section 55, the definition of "nuclear weapon".
2000 c. 11	Terrorism Act 2000	In Schedule 5, paragraph 18(e).
2000 c. 11	Terrorism Act 2000	In Schedule 7, in paragraph 17(4), the "or" at the end of paragraph (b).

== See also ==
- Civil liberties in the United Kingdom
- Human rights in the United Kingdom
- Taking Liberties (film)
- Terrorism Acts in the United Kingdom
- Counterterrorism
- Patriot Act, a sweeping anti-terrorism law passed in the United States around the same time
