= Asylum and Immigration (Treatment of Claimants, etc.) Act 2004 =

Act of the Parliament of the United Kingdom

Asylum and Immigration (Treatment of Claimants, etc.) Act 2004 (Note: Section 50.)
- Act of Parliament
- Parliament of the United Kingdom
- Long title: An Act to make provision about asylum and immigration.
- Citation: 2004 c. 19
- Territorial extent: England and Wales; Scotland; Northern Ireland; (Note: Section 49.)

Dates
- Royal assent: 22 July 2004
- Commencement: Various (Note: Section 48.)
Other legislation
Amends	Immigration Act 1971; Forgery and Counterfeiting Act 1981; Prosecution of Offences Act 1985; Courts and Legal Services Act 1990; Asylum and Immigration Act 1996; Immigration and Asylum Act 1999; Criminal Justice and Court Services Act 2000; Anti-terrorism, Crime and Security Act 2001; Proceeds of Crime Act 2002; Nationality, Immigration and Asylum Act 2002
Amended by	Human Tissue Act 2004; Prevention of Terrorism Act 2005; Serious Organised Crime and Police Act 2005; Immigration, Asylum and Nationality Act 2006; Identity Cards Act 2006; UK Borders Act 2007; Police and Criminal Evidence (Amendment) (Northern Ireland) Order 2007; Identity Documents Act 2010; Transfer of Functions of the Asylum and Immigration Tribunal Order 2010; Treaty of Lisbon (Changes in Terminology) Order 2011; Protection of Freedoms Act 2012; Criminal Justice Act (Northern Ireland) 2013; Immigration Act 2014; Modern Slavery Act 2015; Human Trafficking and Exploitation (Scotland) Act 2015; Human Trafficking and Exploitation (Criminal Justice and Support for Victims) Act (Northern Ireland) 2015; Sentencing Act 2020; Immigration and Social Security Co-ordination (EU Withdrawal) Act 2020 (Consequential, Saving, Transitional and Transitory Provisions) (EU Exit) Regulations 2020; Nationality and Borders Act 2022; Criminal Justice Act 2003 (Commencement No. 33) and Sentencing Act 2020 (Commencement No. 2) Regulations 2022; Illegal Migration Act 2023; Judicial Review and Courts Act 2022 (Magistrates’ Court Sentencing Powers) Regulations 2023
Relates to	Immigration (Isle of Man) Order 2008; Immigration (Jersey) Order 2021; Safety of Rwanda (Asylum and Immigration) Act 2024

Status: Amended

Text of statute as originally enacted

Revised text of statute as amended

The Asylum and Immigration (Treatment of Claimants, etc.) Act 2004 (c. 19) is an act of the Parliament of the United Kingdom. It set various rules for immigrants to the United Kingdom.

== Provisions ==
The act contains measures to deter traffickers from telling asylum seekers to destroy their travel documents.

=== Section 9 ===
The act withdraws support from failed asylum seekers who refuse to be voluntarily deported, including access to the National Health Service.

=== Section 19 ===
In 2006, section 19 of the Act was declared to be incompatible with the Convention for the Protection of Human Rights and Fundamental Freedoms under section 4 of the Human Rights Act 1998. Section 19 dealt with the problem of so-called "sham marriages", where immigrants marry British citizens merely to gain leave to stay. In a case heard by the High Court of Justice in 2006, Mr Justice Stephen Silber ruled that as the section made an exemption for marriages held in the Anglican church, it discriminated against non-Anglicans.

=== Section 48 - Commencement ===
Section 48(2) provides that section 32(1) has effect in relation to determinations of the Special Immigration Appeals Commission made after the end of the period of two months that began on the date on which this act was passed. The word "months" means calendar months. The day (that is to say, 22 July 2004) on which the act was passed (that is to say, received royal assent) is included in the period of two months. This means that section 32(1) has effect in relation to determinations of the Special Immigration Appeals Commission made after 22 September 2004.

The following orders have been made under this section:

- The Asylum and Immigration (Treatment of Claimants, etc.) Act 2004 (Commencement No. 1) Order 2004 (SI 2004/2523 (C. 105))
- The Asylum and Immigration (Treatment of Claimants, etc.) Act 2004 (Commencement No. 2) Order 2004 (SI 2004/2999 (C. 125))
- The Asylum and Immigration (Treatment of Claimants, etc.) Act 2004 (Commencement No. 3) Order 2004 (SI 2004/3398 (C. 159))
- The Asylum and Immigration (Treatment of Claimants, etc.) Act 2004 (Commencement No. 4) Order 2005 (SI 2005/372 (C. 15))
- The Asylum and Immigration (Treatment of Claimants, etc.) Act 2004 (Commencement No. 5 and Transitional Provisions) Order 2005 (SI 2005/565 (C. 25))
- The Asylum and Immigration (Treatment of Claimants, etc.) Act 2004 (Commencement No. 6) Order 2006 (SI 2006/1517 (C. 53))
- The Asylum and Immigration (Treatment of Claimants, etc.) Act 2004 (Commencement No. 7 and Transitional Provisions) Order 2007 (SI 2007/1602 (C. 64))
- The Asylum and Immigration (Treatment of Claimants, etc.) Act 2004 (Commencement No. 1) (Northern Ireland) Order 2007 (SI 2007/845 (C. 33))
- The Asylum and Immigration (Treatment of Claimants etc.) Act 2004 (Commencement) (Scotland) Order 2004 (SI 2004/494 (C. 35))

== Extent ==
This Act extends to England and Wales, Scotland, and Northern Ireland, except that an amendment effected by this Act has the same extent as the enactment, or as the relevant part of the enactment, amended (ignoring extent by virtue of an Order in Council).

As to the extension of this Act to the Isle of Man, see articles 18 and 19 of, and Schedule 8 and Part 6 of Schedule 10 to, the Immigration (Isle of Man) Order 2008 (S.I. 2008/680), and article 8 of the Asylum and Immigration (Treatment of Claimants, etc.) Act 2004 (Remedial) Order 2011 (S.I. 2011/1158), and article 2 of, and paragraphs 7 and 15 of the Schedule to, the Immigration (Isle of Man) (Amendment) Order 2011 (S.I. 2011/1408).

== See also ==
- Immigration Act
