= Border Security, Asylum and Immigration Act 2025 =

Act of the Parliament of the United Kingdom

Border Security, Asylum and Immigration Act 2025 (Note: Section 66.)
- Act of Parliament
- Parliament of the United Kingdom
- Long title: An Act to make provision about border security; to make provision about immigration and asylum; to make provision about sharing customs data and trailer registration data; to make provision about articles for use in serious crime; to make provision about serious crime prevention orders; to make provision about fees paid in connection with the recognition, comparability or assessment of qualifications; and for connected purposes.
- Citation: 2025 c. 31
- Territorial extent: England and Wales; Scotland; Northern Ireland; (Note: Section 64.)

Dates
- Royal assent: 2 December 2025
- Commencement: Various (Note: Section 65.)
Other legislation
Amends	Immigration Act 1971; British Nationality Act 1981; Immigration and Asylum Act 1999; Terrorism Act 2000; Criminal Justice and Police Act 2001; Proceeds of Crime Act 2002; Nationality, Immigration and Asylum Act 2002; Immigration, Asylum and Nationality Act 2006; Serious Crime Act 2007; UK Borders Act 2007; Immigration Act 2016; Data Protection Act 2018; Immigration (Citizens’ Rights Appeals) (EU Exit) Regulations 2020; Immigration (Collection, Use and Retention of Biometric Information and Related Amendments) Regulations 2021; Illegal Migration Act 2023
Repeals/revokes	Safety of Rwanda (Asylum and Immigration) Act 2024

Status: Current legislation

Text of statute as originally enacted

Revised text of statute as amended

The Border Security, Asylum and Immigration Act 2025 (c. 31) is an act of the Parliament of the United Kingdom. The purpose of the act is to reduce irregular immigration, including small boat crossings, and to strengthen laws to help prevent misuse of the immigration and asylum system.

== Adoption ==
The Border Security, Asylum and Immigration Bill was introduced in the House of Commons on 30 January 2025 and completed its passage in that House on 12 May 2025. The bill was introduced in the House of Lords on 13 May 2025 and the second reading was scheduled for 2 June 2025.

== Provisions ==
The act creates a new criminal offence of endangering another during a journey by sea to the UK from France, Belgium or the Netherlands. The first sentences for this offence took place on 10 June 2026.

Prior to the act, refugees offered protection were granted this for 5 years, after which they were able to apply for settlement. The act changed this, so that refugees will instead be required to have their refugee status reviewed every 30 months and the wait for settlement was changed to 20 years, in some circumstances. This enables the government to refuse to extend protection if the circumstances in the country the refugee originated from have changed, making it safe for them to return. In addition, foreign sex offenders are now excluded from obtaining protection as a result of the refugee convention.

The legislation gives immigration and other authorities increased powers to access, search and seize digital devices.

It repealed the Safety of Rwanda Act 2024, so that individuals can no longer be sent to Rwanda. The act also makes it a criminal offence to supply goods to be used in organised immigration crimes, such as channel crossings. Collecting information to be used in an immigration crime was also made a criminal offence.

The provisions made it unlawful to advertise illegal immigration services, in section 17, with the first person charged with this offence in September 2026.

Section 48 places greater responsibility on companies to check the immigration status of individuals beyond employees, such as those contracted to provide services, sub-contractors and gig economy workers, to ensure they have the legal right to work.

The legislation, in sections 49 and 50, set a 24 week time limit for asylum appeals to be heard by a tribunal, in some cases.

== Criticisms ==
The Public Law Project described the new laws as being "unfair, unworkable and unsafe", citing human rights and other concerns. Other criticism, in regard to the criminal offence of endangering another during a sea crossing to the UK, included that sometimes those using smuggling gangs may provide assistance during the crossing, if they are unable to pay the full fee or may themselves be victims of human trafficking.
