= Illegal Migration Act 2023 =

Act of the Parliament of the United Kingdom

Illegal Migration Act 2023 (Note: Section 69.)
- Act of Parliament
- Parliament of the United Kingdom
- Long title: An Act to make provision for and in connection with the removal from the United Kingdom of persons who have entered or arrived in breach of immigration control; to make provision about detention for immigration purposes; to make provision about unaccompanied children; to make provision about victims of slavery or human trafficking; to make provision about leave to enter or remain in the United Kingdom; to make provision about citizenship; to make provision about the inadmissibility of certain protection and certain human rights claims relating to immigration; to make provision about the maximum number of persons entering the United Kingdom annually using safe and legal routes; and for connected purposes.
- Citation: 2023 c. 37
- Introduced by: Suella Braverman, Home Secretary (Commons); The Lord Murray of Blidworth, Parliamentary Under-Secretary of State for Migration and Borders (Lords)
- Territorial extent: England and Wales; Scotland; Northern Ireland; (Note: Section 67.)

Dates
- Royal assent: 20 July 2023
- Commencement: Various (Note: Section 68.)
Other legislation
Amends	Immigration Act 1971; Immigration and Asylum Act 1999; Nationality, Immigration and Asylum Act 2002; Asylum and Immigration (Treatment of Claimants, etc.) Act 2004; Tribunals, Courts and Enforcement Act 2007; UK Borders Act 2007; Legal Aid, Sentencing and Punishment of Offenders Act 2012; Immigration (European Economic Area) Regulations 2016; Nationality and Borders Act 2022
Amended by	Safety of Rwanda (Asylum and Immigration) Act 2024; British Nationality (Irish Citizens) Act 2024; Border Security, Asylum and Immigration Act 2025

Status: Amended

History of passage through Parliament

Records of Parliamentary debate relating to the statute from Hansard

Text of statute as originally enacted

Revised text of statute as amended

The Illegal Migration Act 2023 (c. 37) is an act of the Parliament of the United Kingdom, introduced by the Home Secretary, Suella Braverman, in March 2023. Most of its heavily debated provisions have never been commenced by Home Office Ministers, those targeted to reduce or end "small boat crossings", across the English Channel, which push against elements of international major treaty-based law.

The act proposed to detain and remove those from the UK who arrive in that country by illegal means, as well as blocking them from re-entry. It followed a rise in the number of migrants crossing the English Channel by boat, which increased from 300 annually in 2018 to 45,000 in 2022, and 3,150 as of March 2023. This issue was one of five key priorities outlined in January 2023 by prime minister Rishi Sunak, who tweeted: "If you come here illegally, you can't claim asylum. You can't benefit from our modern slavery protections. You can't make spurious human rights claims and you can't stay."

The bill had its third reading in the House of Commons on 26 April 2023. MPs voted 289–230 in favour of the bill, which was then sent to the House of Lords for consideration.

As widely expected on 5 July 2023, the government began to push through the bill to make it an Act of Parliament, using the power of actual or threatened provisions of the Parliament Act 1911 which enable the elected chamber to deliver Government manifesto commitments. Six days later, Immigration Minister Robert Jenrick explained the government did not support “little short of wrecking amendments” as were tabled by committees and many members in the Lords.

On 20 July 2023, the bill received royal assent (succeeded in becoming an Act of Parliament), requiring future commencement of its most controversial sections – this has not taken place and several will be re-formulated in new laws, which may be commenced, under the Starmer ministry elected the following summer.

== Provisions commenced on 20 July 2023 ==
- sections 30 to 37; section 52; sections 63 to 69. These are: enacting UK settlement consequences for people who have ever met all four removal conditions in section 2; citizenship consequences in the same manner; resultant amendments to the British Nationality Act 1981; a widening of participants in the UK Immigration & Asylum (Upper Tribunal) to include, where the independent judiciary see that resources require, any judge of the First-tier Tribunal; the usual financial provision to any civil service work needed under the Act to be reimbursed (to enable "expenditure" of ministries ("the Minister") to be met by central funds); the usual consequential and minor revisions (wholly cosmetic or explanatory changes to other legislation) including that 61(2) of the UK Borders Act 2007 lists the Act among those affecting this field; the usual limits upon regulations including with express bar on removing unaccompanied children without Parliamentary approval of any such instruments (SIs/Orders in Council/Regulations); definitions (of words); extent (in territory); commencement (see below); short title.

The following provisions come into force on the day on which this Act is passed for the purposes of making regulations—

- section 3 (amendment of date in section 2(3) etc);
- section 4 (unaccompanied children and power to provide for exceptions);
- section 7 (powers to amend Schedule 1);
- section 11(2) (detention under authority of immigration officer);
- section 11(6) (detention under authority of Secretary of State);
- section 18 (duty of local authority to provide information to Secretary of State);
- section 20 (extension of provisions relating to unaccompanied children to Wales, Scotland and Northern Ireland);
- section 24 (modern slavery: support in Scotland);
- section 40 (meaning of “serious and irreversible harm”);
- section 42 (serious harm suspensive claims);
- section 43 (removal conditions suspensive claims);
- section 60(7) (definition of safe and legal routes).

All other provisions require Regulations to commence, and those which have, in some cases have been repealed or suspended.

== Reactions ==
The bill and subsequent act was generally met with backlash from UK rights groups and United Nations agencies, and questions about its legality (to question Parliamentary sovereignty) were raised.

The bill drew criticism from BBC sports presenter Gary Lineker, who posted tweets about the plans, including one in which he described its language as "not dissimilar to that used by Germany in the 30s". The BBC removed him from co-presenting Match of the Day, saying Lineker's statement violated their impartiality policy. The company's actions led to other journalists and commentators withdrawing in support of Lineker.

== See also ==
- English Channel illegal migrant crossings (2018–present)
- Immigration policy of the United Kingdom
- Rwanda asylum plan
- Safety of Rwanda (Asylum and Immigration) Act 2024
