= Energy Act 2011 =

Act of the Parliament of the United Kingdom

- Act of Parliament
- Parliament of the United Kingdom
- Long title: An Act to make provision for the arrangement and financing of energy efficiency improvements to be made to properties by owners and occupiers; about the energy efficiency of properties in the private rented sector; about the promotion by energy companies of reductions in carbon emissions and home-heating costs; about information relating to energy consumption, efficiency and tariffs; for increasing the security of energy supplies; about access to upstream petroleum infrastructure and downstream gas processing facilities; about a special administration regime for energy supply companies; about designations under the Continental Shelf Act 1964; about licence modifications relating to offshore transmission and distribution of electricity; about the security of nuclear construction sites; about the decommissioning of nuclear sites and offshore infrastructure; for the use of pipelines for carbon capture and storage; for an annual report on contribution to carbon emissions reduction targets; for action relating to the energy efficiency of residential accommodation in England; for the generation of electricity from renewable sources; about renewable heat incentives in Northern Ireland; about the powers of the Coal Authority; for an amendment of section 137 of the Energy Act 2004; for the amendment and repeal of measures relating to home energy efficiency; and for connected purposes.
- Citation: 2011 c. 16
- Introduced by: Chris Huhne (Commons); Lord Marland (Lords)

Dates
- Royal assent: 18 October 2011

Status: Amended

The Energy Act 2011 (c 16) is an Act of the Parliament of the United Kingdom relating to UK enterprise law and energy in the UK.

== Provisions ==
The act implemented the Green Deal, a scheme to provide loans to homeowners, landlords and tenants for measures to make homes more energy efficient; the loans would be repaid through electricity bills. The available home improvements included:

- solar panels
- a new boiler
- external wall insulation or wall cladding
- cavity wall insulation
- double glazing windows
- under-floor heating.

At the time the act was passed, the government said it expected that the scheme would continue until 2020, that approximately 26 million homes would be reached by the scheme, amounting to £14 billion in new loans.

The act created standards for the energy efficiency of commercial buildings.

== Commencement ==
The provisions relating to the Green Deal were commenced in 2012.

== Outcome ==
Uptake of Green Deal loans was low, and the government stopped funding the scheme in 2015.

== See also ==
- Energy law
