= Immigration Act 1988 =

Act of the Parliament of the United Kingdom

Immigration Act 1988 (Note: Section 12(1).)
- Act of Parliament
- Parliament of the United Kingdom
- Long title: An Act to make further provision for the regulation of immigration into the United Kingdom; and for connected purposes.
- Citation: 1988 c. 14
- Territorial extent: United Kingdom; Jersey; Guernsey; Isle of Man; (Note: Section 12(5).)

Dates
- Royal assent: 10 May 1988
- Commencement: various (Note: Section 12(4).)
Other legislation
Amends	Immigration Act 1971
Amended by	Channel Tunnel (International Arrangements) Order 1993; Immigration and Asylum Act 1999; International Criminal Court Act 2001
Relates to	Immigration (Jersey) Order 1993; [[[Immigration (Guernsey) Order 1993]]; Immigration and Asylum Act 1999 (Jersey) Order 2003; Immigration (Isle of Man) Order 2008; Treaty of Lisbon (Changes in Terminology) Order 2011; Immigration (Jersey) (Amendment) Order 2017; Immigration and Social Security Co-ordination (EU Withdrawal) Act 2020; Immigration (Isle of Man) (Amendment) Order 2020; Immigration (Isle of Man) (Amendment) (No. 3) Order 2020; Safety of Rwanda (Asylum and Immigration) Act 2024

Status: Amended

Text of statute as originally enacted

Revised text of statute as amended

Text of the Immigration Act 1988 as in force today (including any amendments) within the United Kingdom, from legislation.gov.uk.

The Immigration Act 1988 (c. 14) is an act of the Parliament of the United Kingdom which updated the rules around immigration to the United Kingdom, the Isle of Man and the Channel Islands.

A principal element introduced by this legislation was with respect to the spouses of polygamous marriages. In particular, only one wife or widow would be entitled to come to the UK.
