= Stephen Silber =

Sir Stephen Robert Silber (born 26 March 1944) is a retired British judge of the High Court of England and Wales.

== Legal career ==
Silber was called to the bar at Gray's Inn in 1968 and made a bencher in 1994. In 1987, he became a Queen's Counsel and in the same year appointed a Recorder, qualifying as a Deputy High Court judge from 1995 to 1999. He was a member of the Criminal Law Committee of the Judicial Studies Board (now the Judicial College) and a member of the Law Commission from 1994 to 1999. On 3 December 1999, he was appointed to the High Court of England and Wales, receiving the customary knighthood, and assigned to the Queen's Bench Division. Since 2004, he has served as a member of the Employment Appeal Tribunal. He has an MPhil from Oxford University, where he is an Honorary Fellow.
