= Immigration Act 2014 =

Act of the Parliament of the United Kingdom

Immigration Act 2014 (Note: Section 272(8).)
- Act of Parliament
- Parliament of the United Kingdom
- Long title: An Act to make provision about immigration law; to limit, or otherwise make provision about, access to services, facilities and employment by reference to immigration status; to make provision about marriage and civil partnership involving certain foreign nationals; to make provision about the acquisition of citizenship by persons unable to acquire it because their fathers and mothers were not married to each other and provision about the removal of citizenship from persons whose conduct is seriously prejudicial to the United Kingdom's vital interests; and for connected purposes.
- Citation: 2014 c. 22
- Introduced by: Theresa May 10 October 2013
- Territorial extent: England and Wales; Scotland; Northern Ireland; (Note: Section 272(5)–(7).)

Dates
- Royal assent: 14 May 2014
- Commencement: Various (Note: Section 272(1)–(3).)
Other legislation
Amends	Marriage Act 1949; Immigration Act 1971; British Nationality Act 1981; Road Traffic (Northern Ireland) Order 1981; Road Traffic Act 1988; Special Immigration Appeals Commission Act 1997; Immigration and Asylum Act 1999; Anti-terrorism, Crime and Security Act 2001; Nationality, Immigration and Asylum Act 2002; Asylum and Immigration (Treatment of Claimants, etc.) Act 2004; Immigration, Asylum and Nationality Act 2006; UK Borders Act 2007; Borders, Citizenship and Immigration Act 2009; Legal Aid, Sentencing and Punishment of Offenders Act 2012
Amended by	Immigration (Residential Accommodation) (Prescribed Cases) Order 2014; Immigration Act 2014 (Bank Accounts) (Amendment) Order 2014; Referral and Investigation of Proposed Marriages and Civil Partnerships (Scotland) Order 2015; Referral and Investigation of Proposed Marriages and Civil Partnerships (Northern Ireland and Miscellaneous Provisions) Order 2015; Immigration Act 2016; Investigatory Powers Act 2016; Immigration (Residential Accommodation) (Termination of Residential Tenancy Agreements) (Guidance etc.) Regulations 2016Immigration, Nationality and Asylum (EU Exit) Regulations 2019; Sentencing Act 2020; Immigration and Social Security Co-ordination (EU Withdrawal) Act 2020 (Consequential, Saving, Transitional and Transitory Provisions) (EU Exit) Regulations 2020; Registration of Marriages Regulations 2021; Criminal Justice Act 2003 (Commencement No. 33) and Sentencing Act 2020 (Commencement No. 2) Regulations 2022; Judicial Review and Courts Act 2022 (Magistrates’ Court Sentencing Powers) Regulations 2023; Immigration Act 2014 (Residential Accommodation) (Maximum Penalty) Order 2024; Data (Use and Access) Act 2025
Relates to	Immigration (Isle of Man) Order 2008; Immigration (Biometric Information) (Jersey) Order 2018; Immigration (Isle of Man) (Amendment) Order 2020; Immigration (Guernsey) Order 2020; Citizens' Rights (Application Deadline and Temporary Protection) (EU Exit) Regulations 2020; Immigration (Isle of Man) (Amendment) Order 2021; Immigration (Jersey) Order 2021; Safety of Rwanda (Asylum and Immigration) Act 2024

Status: Amended

History of passage through Parliament

Text of statute as originally enacted

Revised text of statute as amended

The Immigration Act 2014 (c. 22) is an act of the Parliament of the United Kingdom. It received royal assent on 14 May 2014. The act makes provision to prevent private landlords from renting houses to people without legal status, to prevent illegal immigrants from obtaining driving licences and bank accounts and for the investigation of sham marriages. Landlords who rent housing to illegal migrants without carrying out these checks will bear civil liability. Failure to comply with this requirement may result in a civil penalty of no more than £3,000.

Only six Labour MPs opposed the act; Diane Abbott, Jeremy Corbyn, Kelvin Hopkins, John McDonnell, Fiona Mactaggart and Dennis Skinner.

The act removes key protections for Commonwealth citizens residing in the United Kingdom that existed in the Immigration and Asylum Act 1999 which was a major preceding factor in the Windrush scandal that involved at least 83 wrongful deportations.
