= Special Immigration Appeals Commission =

Superior court of record in the UK

The Special Immigration Appeals Commission (also known by the acronym SIAC) is a superior court of record in the United Kingdom established by the Special Immigration Appeals Commission Act 1997 (c. 68) that deals with appeals from persons deported by the Home Secretary under various statutory powers, and usually related to matters of national security. SIAC also hears persons deprived of British citizenship under the British Nationality Act 1981 as amended by Section 4 of the Nationality, Immigration and Asylum Act 2002.

An appellant is represented to the commission by a special advocate who is a person vetted by the Security Service with controversy surrounding the use of secret evidence which only the judges and special advocates have access to.

It previously had the power to certify a person as an international terrorist under Part 4 of the Anti-terrorism, Crime and Security Act 2001 until this was repealed by the Prevention of Terrorism Act 2005.

== See also ==
- Asylum and Immigration Tribunal
