= Nationality, Immigration and Asylum Act 2002 =

Act of the Parliament of the United Kingdom

Nationality, Immigration and Asylum Act 2002 (Note: Section 164.)
- Act of Parliament
- Parliament of the United Kingdom
- Long title: An Act to make provision about nationality, immigration and asylum; to create offences in connection with international traffic in prostitution; to make provision about international projects connected with migration; and for connected purposes.
- Citation: 2002 c. 41
- Territorial extent: United Kingdom (Note: Section 163.)

Dates
- Royal assent: 7 November 2002
- Commencement: Various (Note: Section 162.)
Other legislation
Amends	Immigration Act 1971; Courts and Legal Services Act 1990; Water Industry Act 1991; Immigration and Asylum Act 1999; Anti-terrorism, Crime and Security Act 2001
Amended by	Prevention of Terrorism Act 2005; Immigration, Asylum and Nationality Act 2006; National Health Service (Consequential Provisions) Act 2006; UK Borders Act 2007; Borders, Citizenship and Immigration Act 2009; Local Education Authorities and Children’s Services Authorities (Integration of Functions) Order 2010; Equality Act 2010 (Public Authorities and Consequential and Supplementary Amendments) Order 2011; Immigration Act 2014; Counter-Terrorism and Security Act 2015; Modern Slavery Act 2015; Illegal Migration Act 2023; Border Security, Asylum and Immigration Act 2025; Sentencing Act 2026

Status: Amended

Text of statute as originally enacted

Revised text of statute as amended

The Nationality, Immigration and Asylum Act 2002 (c. 41) is an act of the Parliament of the United Kingdom. It received royal assent on 7 November 2002.

== Provisions ==
=== British Nationals with no other citizenship ===
The act granted British Overseas Citizens, British Subjects and British Protected Persons the right to register as British citizens if they have no other citizenship or nationality and have not after 4 July 2002 renounced, voluntarily relinquished or lost through action or inaction any citizenship or nationality.

=== Overseas born children of British mothers ===
The act has also conferred a right to registration as a British citizen on persons born between 8 February 1961 and 31 December 1982 who, but for the inability (at that time) of women to pass on their citizenship, would have acquired British citizenship automatically when the British Nationality Act 1981 came into force.

=== Deprivation of British nationality ===
Under amendments made by the act to the British Nationality Act 1981, British nationals can be deprived of their citizenship if the Secretary of State is satisfied they are responsible for acts seriously prejudicial to the vital interests of the United Kingdom or an Overseas Territory. This power is restricted to individuals who have dual citizenship.

=== Citizenship ceremonies ===
The act established citizenship ceremonies. This requires swearing allegiance or affirming allegiance to the Monarch and a pledging loyalty to the United Kingdom.

=== English language requirements ===
The act established applicants have a certain standard of English language proficiency.

=== Life in the United Kingdom test ===
The act removes established the Life in the United Kingdom test as a test of having sufficient knowledge of United Kingdom society.

=== Children of unmarried British fathers ===
With effect from 1 July 2006, children may acquire British citizenship automatically from an unmarried British father (or a British permanent resident if the child is born in the United Kingdom). Proof of paternity must be shown.

As of 6 April 2015, a person over 18 years of age who was born out of wedlock before 1 July 2006 to a British father is entitled to register as a British citizen by descent under the Immigration Act 2014 using form UKF. Such child must also meet character requirements, pay relevant processing fees and attend a citizenship ceremony.
