= William Haldane Porter =

"The Chief" – HM Chief Inspector Sir William Haldane-Porter

Sir William Haldane Porter CB (15 May 1867 – 12 September 1944) was a British civil servant, who was responsible for the creation of the Aliens Branch of the Home Office.

== Biography ==
=== Family ===
William Haldane Porter was born on 15 May 1867 at 23 University Square, Belfast within the precincts of Queen's University. His name was given simply as William. The middle name Haldane, by which he was known thereafter, and gave the impression of a combined but unhyphenated double barrelled surname, was added when he was baptised on 30 June 1867 by Rev. Henry Cooke (1788–1868), his maternal grandfather, then President of Assembly's College, Belfast and founding Minister of the May Street Presbyterian Church, Belfast. The name Haldane is that of a maternal uncle, Alexander Haldane Cooke (1836–1870), so called after James Alexander Haldane (1768–1851), independent Scottish church leader, preacher, and missionary, with whom Henry Cooke may have been associated theologically many years earlier.

William was the youngest of the four surviving children (two sons and two daughters) of Rev. Josias Leslie Porter and Margaret Rainey Cooke (c.1827–1898).

His father, Rev. Josias Leslie Porter, hailed from yeoman Scottish settler stock with family lands overlooking Lough Swilly at Burt in county Donegal. He had been a Presbyterian Church of Ireland missionary to the Jews in Palestine based at Damascus between 1849 and 1859, writing several published illustrated books on the subject and a definitive autobiography of his father-in-law Rev Henry Cooke. Upon his return to Ireland he became Professor of Theological Criticism at Queen's College, Belfast and subsequently President (1878), with a house on the domain.

His mother was the youngest of the thirteen children of Henry Cooke. She married Josias Porter on 9 October 1849 when she was just over twenty years old. The ceremony was conducted by her father Henry Cooke, at his own church in May Street Belfast. The couple almost immediately left for Palestine on their missionary work. Besides William, there were 3 other children: Leslie Alexander Selim Porter (later Sir) (1853–1934) born in Damascus, who become Acting Governor General of the United Provinces of India until retirement to England in 1911; Norah Leslie Porter (1854–1934) born in Palestine, and Ellen Beresford Porter (known as Ela) (1864–1944) born in Belfast. Both daughters remained unmarried.

=== Education ===
Sir William was educated at Methodist College Belfast but may have been initially taught at home. At 18, he studied at Queen's College, Belfast on a Literary Scholarship in 1885 for one year. He then went up to Lincoln College, Oxford (with a Goldsmith's Scholarship in 1888) from where he graduated BA in 1891. He went on to study law in the Middle Temple and was called to the Bar in 1895.

=== Marriage and children ===
Sir William was nearly forty years of age when at Hove Parish Church, Sussex he married Sybil Osborne Pochin, who was descended in her maternal line from the Ashby family of Quenby Hall, Leicestershire, of Toft, Lincolnshire on 6 June 1906.”

The couple's married life until retirement was spent at the house named Quenby (now demolished) at Gerards Cross, Buckinghamshire. They had two children, David Leslie Haldane Porter (1907–1960), and Ursula Haldane Porter, later Stretch (1909–1987).

=== Retirement ===
Upon retirement in 1930 Sir William and Lady Sybil made a move from the United Kingdom to Dublin, Ireland. There he took the position of Assistant managing director with the brewing firm Arthur Guinness Son & Co., a role he held until a year before his death in 1944. (He probably made this choice through an earlier connexion with Lord Iveagh, although this cannot now be confirmed.) An enthusiastic gardener, he frequently exhibited and took many prizes at flower shows in Dublin. Lady Sybil died on 25 March 1941 at their home, 98 James's Street, Dublin, part of the Guinness estate.

=== Death and burial ===
Porter died suddenly aged 78 at his Dublin home on 12 September 1944 of heart failure. His funeral took place on 15 September 1944 at St. James' Church, Dublin. He was buried in the grave at St. James next to his late wife.

== Career ==
Before his time at the Home Office, Haldane Porter had combined some practice at the Bar with journalism both in northern Ireland as well as in London where though an Ulster Tory in politics he was for a while sub-editor with the Daily Chronicle. He also written two books: Erasmus – the chancellor’s essays (1893) and The Law relating to Motor Cars (1904). He served as a parliamentary agent for Lord Iveagh, heir to the Guinness family title, at a time when Labour won the seat for Hoxton and Haggerstone, London.

The Royal Commission on Immigration was set up in 1902 in response to the influxes of poor Jews migrating to the east end of London hounded by pogroms from eastern Europe and Russia. Sir William was selected as Secretary. A Home Office memorandum of 20 November 1905 recorded that: “Mr Haldane Porter was selected as Secretary to the Inner Departmental Committee appointed to consider and report what rules and orders ought to be made to give effect to the provision of the Aliens Act 1905 on account of the special knowledge which he had acquired by several years’ work on the question of alien immigration and his expert knowledge upon this subject has been invaluable to the committee. From 1901 to 1904 he was Secretary to the London Prison Visitors Association, the title of which was in 1904 altered to the Borstal Association of which he has continued as Honorary Secretary down to the present time. In this position he has done excellent work”. Accordingly, he was appointed as Inspector under the Aliens Act 1905 at a salary of £500 + £100 after 3 years and a further £100 after 8 years = £700.

In 1905, he was appointed to the newly created post of Inspector under the United Kingdom Aliens Act subsequently amended in 1919 to Chief Inspector under the Aliens Restriction Act of that year. These acts of parliament were the first legislation since Napoleonic times to attempt to control alien entry and departure to and from the United Kingdom. For the next 25 years until 1930 he headed the Aliens' Department of the Home Office which evolved into the UK Immigration Service, and was to become recognised as one of the most efficient of First World War government departments responsible for the security of the realm. It was only with the onset of war in 1914 that the control of entry of aliens to the United Kingdom really brought about focused application to the ongoing national problem.

From the beginning, he presided over Aliens Branch (later Immigration Branch) and its staff of a specialised seasoned corps of Aliens' Officers (later Immigration Officers) initially selected and appointed by him from the ranks of HM Customs & Excise, the Board of Trade and the Services for duties at the nation's approved ports of entry. The result was an elite male-only force with a working knowledge of languages for interview purposes and a somewhat cynical view of human nature and character, sufficient to distinguish the genuine travellers from the false. Porter impressed on them the approach that with due regard to the public safety, their responsibility was to administer regulations with the least inconvenience to the individual. It was reported that he had been offered several important posts outside the service. He made it his job to regularly visit all the ports under his command, and after the First World War regularly attended the ensuing peace conferences whereby the international use of passports came into being. Even years after retirement, at the age of 73, by then residing in Dublin in the neutral Irish Republic, he was called back to supervise the reception of French and Belgian refugees fleeing in 1940 into British channel ports from their occupied countries. Porter was known as a forceful, far-sighted personality, a leader of men and strict disciplinarian. Popular with both his seniors and his staff, he was nicknamed "The Chief".

For his services Porter was appointed a Companion of the Order of the Bath (CB) in 1917, knighted in the 1926 Birthday Honours, and made an officer of the Order of Leopold of Belgium. He retired in 1930. Many of the procedures which Porter put in place remained operational until the present time, as did the associated jargon, thereby forming the basis of the later Immigration Service (now called the United Kingdom Border Force).
