= Aliens Act 1793 =

Act of the Parliament of Great Britain

- Act of Parliament
- Parliament of Great Britain
- Long title: An Act for establishing Regulations respecting Aliens arriving in this Kingdom, or resident therein in certain Cases.
- Citation: 33 Geo. 3. c. 4
- Introduced by: Lord Grenville (Lords)
- Territorial extent: Great Britain

Dates
- Royal assent: 8 January 1793
- Commencement: 10 January 1793 (Note: Section 3.)
- Expired: 1 January 1794 (Note: Section 44.)
- Repealed: 21 August 1871
Other legislation
Repealed by	Statute Law Revision Act 1871

Status: Repealed

Text of statute as originally enacted

The Aliens Act 1793 (33 Geo. 3. c. 4) was an act of the Parliament of Great Britain regulating immigration into the country, in relation with the question of the French Emigration during the Revolution.

Introduced into the House of Lords by Lord Grenville on 19 December 1792, the act was given high priority during the parliamentary session. Despite the concerns of the opposition party, the act became law on 8 January 1793.

== Context ==
=== French Emigration (1789-1815) ===
French Emigration (1789-1815) refers to the mass movement of citizens from France to neighbouring countries in reaction to the bloodshed and upheaval caused by the French Revolution and Napoleonic rule. To escape political tensions and save their lives, many people left France and settled in the neighbouring countries (chiefly Great Britain, Germany, Austria, and Prussia), and a few went to the United States.

The number of refugees fleeing into Britain reached its climax in autumn of 1792. In September alone, a total of nearly 4,000 refugees landed in Britain. The country appealed to people because it had a channel separating them from the revolutionaries and because it was known for being tolerant.

Emigrants primarily settled in London and Soho, the latter had grown into a thriving French cultural district, complete with French hotels and cuisine, although it had long been a haven for French exiles, housing many thousands of Frenchmen from the last mass migration, of Huguenots, which occurred in reaction to the 1685 revocation of the Edict of Nantes, and the ensuing Foreign Protestants Naturalization Act 1708.

=== British fears about the French refugees ===
The uncontrolled influx of foreigners created significant anxiety in government circles.

Particularly, the British Government feared the presence of spies and Jacobin agents disguised as refugees in the country. J. W. Bruges, secretary of the Foreign Office, wrote to Lord Grenville on 14 September: "By what I can learn, the majority of these people are of a suspicious description, and very likely either to do mischief of their own accord, or to be fit tools of those who may be desirous of creating confusion".

Additionally, the newspapers during the latter part of 1792 emphasised strong public suspicions of "Frenchmen in England" and demanded that high control and security measures be placed onto Britain.

=== Convening of Parliament ===
On 1 December 1792, in response to this crisis, the King issued a royal proclamation pursuant to section 95 of the Militia Act 1786 (26 Geo. 3. c. 107) that "the utmost industry was still employed by evil-disposed persons within the kingdom, acting in concert with persons in foreign parts, with a view to subvert the laws and constitution; and that a spirit of tumult and disorder, thereby excited, had lately shown itself in acts of riot and insurrection — And that, these causes moving him thereto, his majesty had resolved forthwith to embody the militia of the kingdom". On the same day, the King issued another royal proclamation convening the Parliament (which stood prorogued until 3 January 1793), which met on 13 December 1792.

== The act ==
The act enforced that aliens be recorded upon arrival and register with the local justice of the peace. More specifically, those who arrived in Great Britain after January 1793 were required to give their names, ranks, occupations, and addresses. Even those who housed or roomed with an alien had to send similar details.

It further held that violators of the act could be held without bail or mainprise, either to be deported or as punishment, a provision that caused critics to decry it as a suspension of habeas corpus; indeed, its sponsor in Parliament had earlier called it "a bill for suspending the Habeas Corpus Act, as far as it should relate to the persons of foreigners."

During the war period, the act gave an extraordinary power to the government and placed all foreigners in the country at the mercy of the government. All immigrants feared deportation because of either their political views or security reasons, or, simply because they were regarded as an undesirable persons.

== Consequences ==
Despite in theory being an emergency measured to be renewed annually, it remained in force for over thirty years.

Expulsions under the act were limited but it very substantially restricted immigration to Great Britain. Whilst designed for the fear that Jacobins might be hidden amongst royalists fleeing from the French Revolution, it caught all aliens coming to the country and hence had led to sharp decline in Jewish immigration to Great Britain.

One illustrious victim of the act seems to have been Charles Maurice de Talleyrand-Périgord, who had to leave Great Britain for the USA.

== Subsequent developments ==
The whole act was repealed by section 1 of, and the schedule to, the Statute Law Revision Act 1871 (34 & 35 Vict. c. 116), which came into force on 21 August 1871.

== See also ==
- Alien Office
- Aliens Act 1905
- History of UK immigration control
