= History of UK immigration control =

Modern immigration border controls originated in 1905, although some means of controlling foreign visitors to the United Kingdom existed before then. Although the Aliens Act 1793 was passed and remained in force to some extent until 1836, there were no controls between then and 1905 barring a very loosely policed system of registration on entry.

== History ==
=== Aliens Act 1905 and the Immigration Boards ===
The beginnings of the modern-day UK immigration control can be traced from the final decade of the 19th century and the political debate that grew surrounding the perceived growth in the numbers of Eastern European Jews coming to the UK. Political alarm was also expressed regarding the rising numbers of foreign national criminals in UK prisons, the growing demands on poor relief within local parishes and fears of degenerating health and housing conditions.

There was particular focus on the large numbers of Russian and Polish Jews who had arrived in the East End of London after fleeing persecution in the Russian Empire. In 1898 the Secretary of the Board of Trade reported a "…stream of Russian and Polish immigration—in other words, the immigration of the most destitute type...increasing in volume year by year". The numbers of arrivals were highly debatable owing to the deficiencies in available statistics. Concerns focussed on perceived overcrowding in the East End of London.

The legislation that finally emerged was the Aliens Act 1905. It was easily evaded, and did not even require Immigration Officers to give written permission to land or stamp a passport – permission to land was given verbally.

It was, however, the first legislation to define some groups of migrants as 'undesirable', thereby making entry to the United Kingdom discretionary, rather than automatic. The Act ensured that leave to land could be withheld if the immigrant was judged to fall into one of four categories:

- a) if he cannot show that he has in his possession ... the means of decently supporting himself and his dependents;
- b) if he is a lunatic or an idiot or owing to any disease of infirmity liable to become a charge upon the public rates;
- c) if he has been sentenced in a foreign country for a crime, not being an offence of a political character; or
- d) if an expulsion order under this act has [already] been made.

People refused entry under the act were given a right of appeal to the Immigration Board in charge of control of one of the designated ports listed by statute and the practical application of the control was conducted by the new Aliens Inspectorate and its officers, the first Immigration Officers, who were hurriedly recruited from within the existing ranks of HM Customs and the Board of Trade. Their basic task was to test whether the traveler had means of support which might be proven by either presentation of cash or evidence of a firm offer of employment. The inspection generally took place aboard ships or in “receiving houses” on shore. The anomalies within the regulations meant that it was common for passengers to evade the control by the simple means of posing as 2nd or 3rd class passengers or sharing the evidence of funds between them. The head of the new organization was titled HM Inspector and its first incumbent was Mr. William Haldane Porter.

=== 1914–1918: Immigration control during the First World War ===
1914 marked a landmark in UK immigration control in that it was only from this point that every person entering the country had to produce evidence of identity. The Aliens Registration Act 1914 was rushed through Parliament in a single day on the eve of the First World War and allowed stricter controls than before including the power to make aliens aged over 16 register with the police. The power still remains in use. Although the Aliens Act 1905 technically survived until its repeal in 1919, it was, in practice, submerged by the far more stringent powers of the Aliens Restriction Act 1914. The 1914 act contained a clause which gave the Home Secretary power to prevent the entry and order the deportation of aliens if it was deemed 'conducive to the public good'. For the purposes of the 1914 legislation immigration officers were re-titled Aliens Officers and the service was a compound of Home Office staff and Customs staff.

In order to mark someone's arrival and departure the new Aliens Officers endorsed the passports of passengers with red stamps on arrival and with black stamps to cancel the endorsement on the persons departure. In April 1915 an Order in Council was made that no alien passenger was to be allowed to land unless he held either a passport with a photograph attached issued within the two preceding years, or some other document establishing his national status and identity. Prior to this passports had not contained photographs and had not been stamped in any way.

From April 1915 only passengers with exit permits were allowed to leave the UK, and then only from certain ports. In an extension to their duties that would be repeated during the Second World War, officers were tasked with retrieving ration documents from departing passengers. In 1916 a “Traffic Index” was created from the landing and embarkation cards collected at ports and matched together at the Home Office's Aliens Branch HQ to show whether the person had complied with their conditions of entry. This simple process was the only mechanism for measuring the effectiveness of the control and continued until 1998 when embarkation controls were abolished. By 1920, the number of Aliens' Officers had reached 160.

=== Immigration controls in the 1920s and 1930s ===
The Aliens Order 1920 was a statutory instrument made under the 1Aliens Restriction Act 1919. Brought out in the context of widespread unemployment after the First World War, it required all aliens seeking employment or residence to register with the police. The order drew its powers from the 1919 act and granted a wide-ranging discretion to the Home Secretary. It stipulated that no alien might land without the permission of an immigration officer, by way of a passport stamp, and granted powers to attach conditions to the grant of leave, to refuse those who could not support themselves, and their dependants, those medically unfit and those convicted of crimes abroad. It gave the power to demand documents satisfactorily establishing identity and nationality. It restricted the employment rights of aliens resident in Britain, barring them from certain jobs (in the civil service, for example), and had a particular impact on foreign seamen working on British ships. It required people seeking employment in the UK to obtain permission from the Ministry of Labour, which was of huge significance in establishing a link, for the first time, between immigration control and the employment market. It also targeted criminals, paupers and ‘undesirables’, and made it illegal for aliens to promote industrial action – a response to fears of imported revolutionaries following the still recent Russian Revolution. Further motivation to extend restrictions on foreigners was driven by post-war unemployment and the consequent desire to safeguard jobs for indigenous Britons. The 1919 act was renewed annually until 1971 until it was replaced by the Immigration Act 1971.

A new dimension to the work arrived in the 1920s where the influx of visitors to the Wembley Exhibition meant that the traffic generated by air travel could no longer be ignored. It was decided to appoint one immigration officer to deal with incoming passengers at the main London airport in Croydon. By 1925 the Immigration Officer at Croydon Airport was dealing with 15 aircraft movements per day. By 1937 the total numbers of people arriving by air reached 37,348, still a paltry number when compared to the numbers arriving by sea, 498,326. The numbers arriving at seaports would continue to rise, but would be outstripped by the late 1950s by the rise of air travel.

The 1930s were marked by the ever-increasing numbers of refugees arriving from Europe fleeing from Nazi Germany. Refugee arrivals rose from close to zero in 1930 to 3109 in 1933. By 1938 the annual figure was 11,000. After 1936 the figures were augmented by the numbers fleeing from war-torn Spain. Although there was no publicly stated policy for the admission of political refugees before 1971, a settled but implicit approach had emerged during the 1930s. The handling of refugees was largely dependent on their being able to show that they could maintain themselves or be maintained. The Immigration Service cooperated with the Jewish support organizations who worked to provide support or provide sponsors but there was no agreed international approach to the handling of refugees. A Home Secretary memo to the Cabinet in 1933 shows that efforts were made to take a flexible approach but admitted that some refugees, ("a few") had been refused and returned to France where they awaited a relaxation of the rules. Restrictions placed on Jewish refugees were based mainly on economic fears for the employment market.

Statistics for 1938 and 1939 show Germans as being the top nationality refused entry for both years and it is likely that a large proportion of these were potential refugees being returned to an uncertain fate. That said, the UK admitted more Germans than any other nationality in 1939 and continued to admit Germans throughout the war.

In late November 1938 the UK Parliament agreed to allow up to 15,000 unaccompanied children to enter Britain as refugees from the Nazis. Almost 10,000 such children from several European countries, but principally from Germany, were rescued by Britain in what became known as the Kindertransport. The first transport left Germany in December 1938 with most ending at the outbreak of war, but a final Kindertransport left the Netherlands in May 1940.

An ever-increasing number of passengers travelled in happier circumstances on the great liners of the day. The RMS Queen Mary for instance presented problems in quickly clearing large numbers of passengers and to do so within Victorian Customs Sheds was increasingly impractical. Shipping companies invited a solution whereby Immigration Officers travelled 1st class on the liner itself or pre-cleared passengers in Cherbourg. In 1936 air traffic had grown to such an extent that a Chief Immigration Officer was appointed to take charge at Croydon Airport with additional responsibilities for immigration control in the new Gatwick terminal, which with its very own direct rail link to London and art deco architecture was the last word in airport design until it was replaced in the 1950s.

=== 1939–1945: Immigration control during the Second World War ===
War brought with it new emergency powers which meant that the Immigration Service now, as well as continuing to control the entry of a wave of displaced people, had to screen refugees, enforce rules on exit permits for all people leaving the UK and to take on the additional work of repatriating some enemy aliens. Ireland's neutrality meant that steps had to be taken to introduce new controls between the UK and Republic. The Passenger Traffic Order 1939 remained in force until 1952 and a large proportion of the work of the immigration service during the war was taken up by the control of Irish workers seeking employment in the growing war economy.

Croydon Airport was closed and became a fighter base; its passenger traffic transferred to Shoreham. The Dunkirk evacuation brought with it not only rescued troops but also vast numbers of refugees and displaced people who had to be screened. Large numbers of Dutch and Belgian refugees were temporarily placed in camps on Brownsea Island in Poole harbour. The possibility of enemy agents gaining entry under the guise of being part of this group was very real and Immigration Service staff were seconded to interview refugees and displaced people at special reception centres. The main one of these was the Royal Victoria Patriotic School at Wandsworth in London, whose MI6 interrogators included Colonel Oreste Pinto. During four years over 30,000 people were interviewed at this centre. Other wartime work involving Immigration staff included the examination of British refugees exchanged with the Germans via Lisbon.

As the passenger traffic through the channel ports shrank, the efforts of border control were focused on the merchant shipping that kept Britain's lifelines open and many staff were redeployed to Scottish ports, Bristol and English northern ports for the duration. An office was also set up at Dartmouth to deal with the Channel convoys. Staff were also later deployed to Poole to deal with flying boat services which flew routes to Lisbon via Ireland and were of especial interest because of those seeking to exit occupied Europe.

In Scotland the great "Queens" brought troop ships containing up to 15,000 troops each. The ports of Glasgow and Gourock pooled their resources to deal with the Russian convoys. Scottish immigration staff also covered the airports at Dyce and Leuchars, (which played their part as terminals for the dangerous Mosquito service to Stockholm), and found themselves occasionally giving a reception to escaped resistance fighters arriving in the Shetland Islands. In the first six months of 1940 Scottish immigration officers examined almost 4000 survivors from upwards of 100 ships sunk by enemy action. Some of these were found to be spies, and duly executed.

=== 1945–1961: Post-war growth of Commonwealth immigration ===
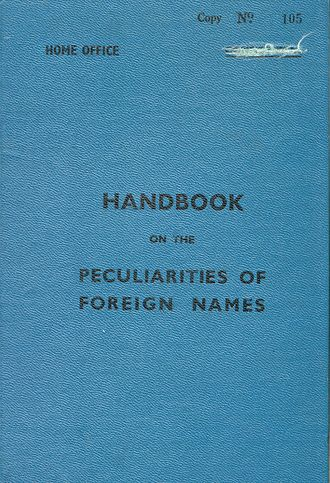
Cover from the 1949 UK Immigration Service "Handbook of the Peculiarities of Foreign Names" with introduction by HM Chief Inspector W.R. Perks. An inscription shows that it was originally issued to Mr W. Argent, HM Immigration Office, Havelock Chambers, Queen's Terrace, Southampton. It contains such useful information as advice on transliteration from the Cyrillic alphabet, advice on Russian patronymics and common Greek names in English characters.

Re-establishing normal controls after the war took time to accomplish. Dover was eventually fully staffed again after a gap of six years and Croydon airport was reopened to passenger traffic. Southampton was faced with a rising number of passenger liners returning to peacetime service. A far reaching report by the Croydon Inspector after the war reviewed the processes for dealing with the growing number of air passengers. It suggested that these should, in future, be separated into inbound and outbound control areas and that arriving passengers should be marshalled or “funnelled” into one control area regardless of what aircraft they had arrived on.

In 1946 the major airport controlling air traffic was Hurn Airport in Dorset. Although well organised, its location so far from London made it unpopular with carriers. It was agreed that the main passenger airport for London would be Heathrow, which opened on 1 May 1946 and came under the command of the Croydon Inspector. It was still a time of displaced people finding their way home after the war and passenger liners still travelled to the West Indies to return servicemen who had been de-mobbed. The owners of the shipping lines sought to reduce their costs for return journeys, which promised to otherwise have few passengers, and offered cut price fares to the UK. The first of these vessels to arrive, in 1947, was the now little remembered MV Ormonde which brought 108 migrant workers and attracted little notice. The arrival of the HMT Empire Windrush, generated far greater attention.

Over and above the continuing movement of displaced people there were other signs of re-adjustment following the end of the war. The Polish Resettlement Act 1947 allowed 200,000 Polish citizens to stay following the war and it took until 1952 for the wartime restrictions on travel between the UK and Ireland to be abolished and a Common Travel Area was created between all the islands which still exists today. From the early 1950s immigration officers were allocated to deal with the residual screening of people who had arrived during and after the war who had still to have their status regularised.

The Aliens Order 1953 replaced the Aliens Order 1920 and consolidated various other statutory instruments since the First World War. The 1950s brought special challenges such as the influx of visitors for the Coronation of Queen Elizabeth II in 1953, a year which also saw the opening of the new passenger car ferry terminal at Eastern Docks, Dover. Despite the increase in traffic the numbers of those detained on entry remained small. During the parliamentary debate for the 1953 act the Home Secretary was asked how many people were currently in detention and advised that on 22 July 1953 the total number of immigration detainees in the UK was 11.

The position of refugees had been under review since the war. Questions had necessarily been posed as to whether more could and should have been done to save Jewish refugees fleeing Nazi persecution. The result was the 1951 Convention Relating to the Status of Stateless Persons. Originally intended to encompass only European refugees it was later extended to all countries. Overlapping waves of refugees had to be dealt with in the wake of the Suez Crisis and Hungarian Revolution of 1956. Between 19 November and 3 December 1956, 4221 refugees arrived at Dover and the Immigration Service was increasingly hard pressed. At that time it numbered fewer than 400 staff, including managers, to cover 30 different ports across the United Kingdom 24 hours per day and seven days a week. In 1959, a watershed moment arrived where, for the first time, more passengers arrived by air than by sea, (741,669 to 738,367).

After the mid-1950s employers were prompted by a general labour shortage to recruit directly from the West Indies. The London Transport executive made an agreement with the Barbadian Immigration Liaison Service. Other employers, such as the British Hotel and Restaurant Association, made similar agreements. In the 1950s most Indian migrant workers to arrive in Britain were Sikhs from the rural areas of the Punjab, where the partition of the Punjab between India and Pakistan had created immense pressure on land resources during the 1950s and 1960s, greatly increasing such emigration from then on. In the period immediately before and after the introduction of the 1962 act, the entry of dependents into Britain increased almost threefold as families attempted to 'beat the act', amidst widespread fears that Britain planned to permanently close its doors to its citizens in the New Commonwealth, including the families of those already living in Britain. Total "New" Commonwealth immigration thus grew from 21,550 entrants in 1959, to 58,300 in 1960. A year later this last figure had more than doubled and a record 125,400 "New" Commonwealth immigrants entered the UK in 1961.

Consideration of legislation to place controls on Commonwealth citizens had by 1960 already been under active consideration for some years. A Cabinet committee comprising senior Cabinet members including the Home Secretary produced a report in 1956 which detailed the numbers of arriving black and Asian migrants in the early 1950s. It directly addressed what it saw as the key issue of migration from "coloured territories". The report discussed the possibility that the British public might react badly to a law that was seen to be overtly racist and attempted to address the central difficulty of putting legislation into place that met its aims without appearing to be racially motivated. It noted, "There is no doubt that even though a Bill...would in form be non-discriminatory, it would nevertheless be clear against whom the Bill was really directed". The committee agreed that, presentationally, it would be best to emphasise the potential housing shortages that further migration might bring about.

=== 1962–1968: Post-imperial restrictions ===
The Commonwealth Immigrants Act 1962 came about as a result of growing public and political unease regarding the impact of migration from the, now fast declining, British Empire. West Indian immigration, (especially), had, since the war, continued to grow fairly gently but steadily until there were by 1956 around 100,000 new West Indian migrants in the UK. There were echoes of the public outcry which had brought about the Aliens Act 1905 and the political arguments, in public at least, similarly attempted to focus on the economic control of migrant labour and attempted to skirt around the underlying racial prejudices that were voiced by their constituents. Whatever the motivations of those concerned, it was clear that the common citizenship status shared by the various members of the Empire, or Commonwealth, as it was becoming known, was untenable with a world population growing more mobile. There was also a better understanding than there had been in 1948 that Britain's world position had irrevocably changed as it moved away from the assumptions of empire towards potential membership of the European Economic Community.

The new act was seen by its opponents as draconian, but it created only limited powers to deal with those who misrepresented their intentions or entered illegally. Preparations to implement the new act included a recruitment campaign in 1962 which brought the staffing of the Immigration Service up to 500 ready for the start date on 1 July 1962.

Commonwealth governments had warned that the new restrictions would create a black market in forged documentation and they were proven correct. The 1960s saw an emergent boom, in immigration terms, of bogus students. A market grew in bogus colleges and forged documents provided by racketeers who would, for a price, provide a complete package comprising travel, documents and illegal work. They commonly reclaimed their investment on a proportion of the migrant's illicit wages. Other developing trends included bogus marriages and forged birth certificates which were designed to allow “children” to join relatives in the UK as dependants despite being clearly above the permitted age.

The Immigration Branch, and the administrative HQ at Princeton House in High Holborn, were limited in their ability to combat these abuses. The entire administrative strength of the Immigration and Nationality Dept was approximately 300 and before 1962 IND was divided into three "Divisions" B1, (casework), B2, (policy) and A2, (admin). In 1962 another Division was created, B3, to deal with deportation casework. No formal operational enforcement and detection structure was to come into being until the 1970s and realistic legal powers to deal with illegal migrants would not appear until 1973 with the implementation of the 1971 Act.

The quality of Entry Clearances, (Visas), issued abroad in the newly controlled Commonwealth countries also gave cause for concern when presented at British ports. The initial assumption when the 1962 act was introduced was that these would be taken at face value on arrival. An instruction to Immigration Officers created a general understanding that written entry conditions would only be recorded and stored in exceptional circumstances.

By 1965 new instructions had been issued which, although very liberal by later standards, encouraged control officers to impose conditions more often and to refuse people who had clearly obtained entry clearances by misrepresentation.

The emotive Rivers of Blood speech by Enoch Powell in 1968 changed the political landscape for anyone attempting to consider practical, administrative issues for many years to come. Thirty-nine Heathrow immigration officers wrote to Enoch Powell in support of tougher controls whereupon he made their note public. Although their concerns were based on what they saw as a lack of administrative powers to do their job effectively, they breached their impartiality as civil servants and were disciplined as a consequence.

=== 1968–1978: New laws and European Union membership ===
The key events leading to the hurried introduction of the Commonwealth Immigrants Act 1968 were the independence of, first, Kenya and, later, Uganda and Tanzania. Each of these countries at independence had an established minority population of Indian origin, some of whom had been introduced into East Africa by Britain which, as colonial power, had employed them on construction projects. Many had left India before its independence and before the creation of Pakistan, and their only citizenship was that of the UK and Colonies.

The potential numbers of those eligible to travel to the UK created alarm, and the Commonwealth Immigrants Act 1968 was rushed through Parliament. The new Act provided that British subjects would be free from immigration control only if they, or at least one of their parents or grandparents, had been born, adopted, registered or naturalised in the UK. The issue of a passport by a British High Commission thus ceased to be a qualification for entry free of control. For those subject to control, another voucher system was introduced. This one was based on tight quotas. The 1968 Act directly, and deliberately, favoured white commonwealth citizens more likely to have British ancestry. Cabinet papers released in 2002 showed that the thrust of the legislation was designed to have this effect.

By the end of the 1960s the previous practice of detaining immigration offenders in prison was increasingly unworkable as numbers of detainees rose. A dedicated facility was opened near Heathrow in a disused RAF base which became the Harmondsworth Immigration Removal Centre. At Gatwick Airport temporary detention accommodation was located in the disused 1930s air terminal and housed around 15 detainees.

By the end of the 1960s immigration legislation and rules were drawn from too many sources. Consensus was reached that a completely new Immigration Act was needed to tighten controls, clarify the rules and unify the law for foreign and commonwealth nationals. This major reappraisal and consolidation of immigration law coincided with an expansion of the Immigration Branch administrative HQ, change of name and a change of location. In 1972 the Immigration and Nationality Department relocated from High Holborn to Croydon where it took up residence at the recently built Lunar House. The Immigration Branch at ports of entry was retitled the Immigration Service.

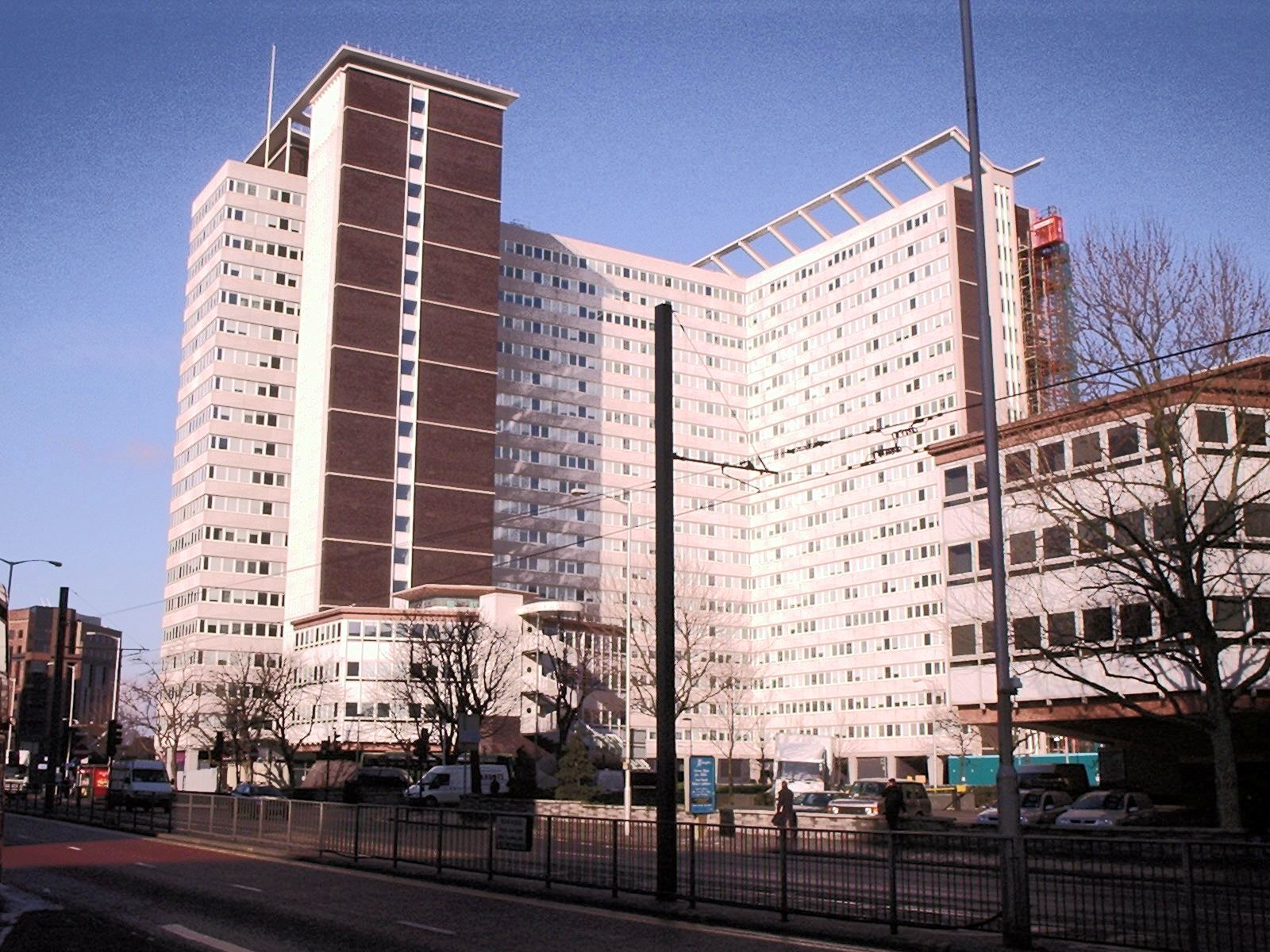
Lunar House; since 1972 the HQ of UK Immigration.

The Immigration Act 1971 gave right of abode in the UK to those it defined as ‘patrials’. These were:

1. citizens of the UK and Colonies who had that citizenship (i) by birth, adoption, naturalization, or registration in the UK;
2. citizens of the UK and Colonies whose parent or grandparent had that citizenship by those same means at the time of the birth of the person in question;
3. citizens of the UK and Colonies with five years’ ordinary residence in the UK;
4. Commonwealth citizens whose parent or grandparent was born or adopted in the UK before their birth;
5. Commonwealth citizens married to a patrial man.

The Act replaced employment vouchers with Work permits, allowing only temporary residence. Commonwealth citizens who had been settled in the UK for five years when the Act came into force, (1 January 1973), also had the right to register and thus possibly the right of abode. Others would be subject to immigration controls. Apart from the five-year residence qualification, the right to live in the UK and to enter free from immigration control was determined by birth or parentage, not by nationality.

On the same day that the new Act came into force, 1 January 1973, the UK entered the European Economic Community (EEC). At the same time that immigration restrictions were confirmed for Commonwealth citizens (Africa, Asia, Caribbean, Americas and Pacific) with a traditional allegiance to Britain, a new category of privilege was created for the European nationals who had formed the bulk of the work of the Immigrations Service for the preceding 50 years. This represented a dramatic change in Freedom of Movement from one that was previously ethnically diverse that included nations from Africa, Asia, America's, Caribbean and Pacific to white only European nations. Membership of the European Community, now the European Union, encompassed the freedom of movement of workers within member states. The practical reality of membership from an immigration control standpoint was that EU nationals were separated from other arriving passengers. As, in theory at least, they could be excluded or deported, (for instance following criminal conviction), there still continued checks against warnings lists. In 1970 the staff numbers within the Immigration Service had risen to approximately 1100 - rather more than double the administration workers at its London HQ.

Despite the legislation of 1968 and 1971, the numbers of Commonwealth citizens coming to settle still caused political anxiety that was often racially based - especially where projections of future trends were based on a list of vague assumptions. The lack of reliable statistics and access to data was to be a recurring theme throughout the 1980s and beyond. The old "Traffic Index" of manually collated landing and embarkation cards was replaced by a new computer system, (INDECS), in 1979 but the primitive database was a limited success and the use of paper cards continued. Immigration Officers working in 24-hour ports-of-entry only had access to the main immigration database via telephone during office hours Monday to Friday.

=== 1979–1989: Expansion, new visa controls, and carriers liability ===
The incoming Conservative administration in 1979 acted to introduce more legislation - the British Nationality Act 1981- which again tightened citizenship criteria. From an immigration control standpoint there was growing concern, and heated debate, concerning the restrictions placed on foreign spouses joining UK partners. There was evidence that marriage was being used by some as a means to circumvent the stricter settlement rules and a particular focus on applications from the Indian sub-continent. In the absence of overseas visa controls there was an incentive for prospective spouses to attempt to gain entry as visitors and apply for stay on the basis of marriage once in the UK once the marriage had taken place. The attempts by the Immigration Service at ports to investigate suspected bogus marriages impacted on cultural and racial sensitivities where the differences between marriages arranged legitimately according to custom and those arranged for immigration purposes were difficult to separate. In 1983 new immigration rules regarding marriage were introduced which required people to satisfy IND and UKIS that the "primary purpose" of the marriage was not for immigration purposes.

The thrust of IND's policy throughout the 1980s was to continue to reassure public and political opinion that the numbers of those settling in the UK was under control and to try and take the heat out the immigration issue. The emphasis on settlement statistics remained the most important statistical indicator until the steep rise in asylum numbers in the early 1990s.

The pressures on the inbound controls presented by the growth in numbers and rates of refusal for some nationalities meant that, by 1986, there was increasing pressure for new visa requirements. On 1 September 1986, new visa restrictions were announced for India, Pakistan, Bangladesh, Nigeria and Ghana as the UK leading to further racial exclusion from Africa and Asia in favour of white EU nations. For reasons which are unclear the visa restrictions did not come into force until 15 October (23 October for Ghana). The ensuing panic over the weeks in between the announcement and implementation of the new rules brought Heathrow Airport to a standstill and the evening television news bulletins contained footage of hundreds of detainees camped in the main arrivals hall at Terminal 3 awaiting processing.

Growing pressures on immigration detention accommodation resulted in an attempt to provide additional capacity by means of a floating detention centre. The Earl William was an ex cross-channel ferry refitted for a new role as a static, secure holding facility moored at Harwich. Its use provoked hostile opposition but the Home Office pressed forward with the idea and the Earl William was contracted into service under the management of Securicor, who had been running immigration detention facilities since 1970. Acceptance of the new arrangements required that the Earl William prove itself as cost effective, humane and secure. In October 1987 the strongest gale to hit England in 200 years broke the vessel free of its moorings and it ran aground on a sandbank. Although none of its 78 detainees was injured, the credibility of the exercise was fatally undermined and it was not used again.

The 1987 Carriers Liability Act sought to place greater responsibility on those bringing passengers to the UK to verify that their documentation was in order. The Act gave powers to fine the carrier £1000 for each inadmissible passenger. This fine was doubled in August 1991 and two years later extended to cover passengers without transit visas where these were required. This applied as much to lorry drivers and owners of small aircraft as it did to international airlines and was fiercely resisted by the transport lobby. The numbers of clandestine illegal entrants continued to increase despite the sanctions imposed. In 1998 8000 illegal entrants were detected arriving clandestinely where, in 1992, there had been 500. The Act insisted that carriers, including hauliers, should take responsibility for those they brought to the UK but allowed that carriers could not be expected to be experts in forged or counterfeit documents. The fine was applied however where, in the opinion of the Immigration Service, the forgery was "readily apparent". Carriers were also fined for the more demonstrable errors of transporting people without identity documents or without a visa where they were required to have one. The 1987 Act was later repealed and replaced by provisions within the 1999 Act. Between its implementation and 1991 approximately £30m in fines were imposed. The numbers of "designated" ports, i.e.: those licensed to allow international passengers rose in 1987 to include Leeds/Bradford Airport, Newcastle and Edinburgh and a new terminal opened at Gatwick in 1988.

The fall of the Berlin Wall brought with it a new political landscape, opened up travel routes long closed and meant the re-emergence of nationalities which had been submerged within the Soviet bloc. The relaxation of travel restrictions raised concerns at the potential movement of labour from other countries in Eastern Europe and visa controls were applied in 1992.

=== 1990–1997: The growth in asylum ===
The number of asylum seekers before 1979 is difficult to determine as no separate statistics were collated before this point. A Parliamentary answer indicated that in 1973, 34 people had been granted refugee status. The application of the 1951 Convention dealing with the treatment of refugees was still being applied, to a large extent, to those people fleeing persecution from behind the Iron Curtain.

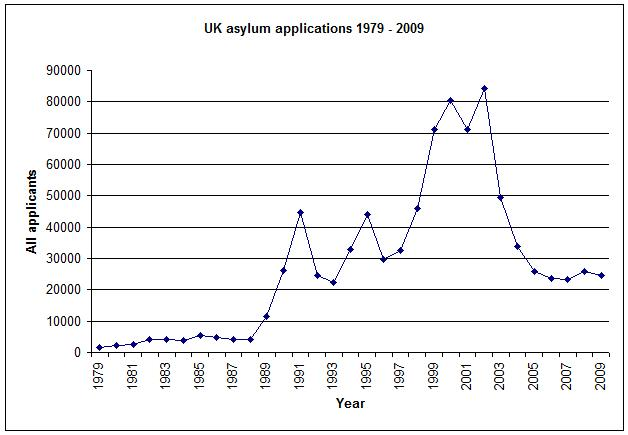
UK asylum applications 1979–2009. Numbers of new applications for asylum, (not including dependents) peaked in 2002 at 84,130 - source; Home Office, Control of Immigration and Asylum statistics, HMSO

The total number of asylum applications in 1979 was 1563 and by 1988 had risen, fairly steadily but not too dramatically, to 3998. In 1989 the numbers of applications rose sharply, to 11640, and by 1991 had reached 44840. The reasons for the dramatic rise are complex and have to be seen in the context of international travel patterns to other European nations.

Only a very small proportion, 5% in 1994, of applicants were granted full refugee status. Of the others a larger number were granted Exceptional Leave, (later re-titled Discretionary Leave), usually on the basis that other compassionate circumstances applied such as family ties.

The rates of refusal highlighted a growth in applicants whose motive was found to be economic migration rather than genuine fear of return. The reasons for the rapid increase in arrivals included increasing availability of cheaper air travel, the existence by then of community groups able to provide support on arrival, relative economic prosperity that made employment possible, the availability of Legal aid to pursue the claim and eligibility to certain benefits and accommodation. For those who might otherwise have intended to enter and work illegally the benefit of an outstanding asylum claim was the legitimacy it conferred and safety as regards arrest.

The administrative processes governing asylum applications were overwhelmed and a backlog started to accumulate. The increased delays meant more applicants eventually found themselves eligible for concessions based on the length of time the process had taken and this, in turn, encouraged speculative applications from those who saw no future in pursuing the difficult alternatives offered of seeking permission to remain through legitimate settlement or approved employment. As numbers rose, a decreasing proportion were found to qualify for refugee status. In 1980, in the United Kingdom, 64 per cent. of claimants were recognised as refugees. In 1990, the figure was about 25 per cent.

Between 1995 and 2000 the newest problem the Immigration Service faced was the growth in asylum seekers entering via the Channel Tunnel with 700 a month presenting themselves at Waterloo station. Waterloo, as an international terminal, was later replaced by the control at St Pancras station and the creation of "juxtaposed controls" agreed by the Sangatte Protocol of 1992 which was itself brought into being by the Channel Tunnel (International Arrangements) Order 1993. This allowed for control zones to be set up at each end of the tunnel; the British end at St Pancras operated by French officers and the French control zone at Coquelles staffed by UK Immigration Officers. A passenger at Coquelles was still legally in France; the international frontier was at the midpoint of the tunnel. In immigration terms a person did not enter the UK until they left the terminal at Cheriton. This brought about some complex scenarios; it was not possible to claim asylum in the UK at Coquelles but it was possible to enter the control area illegally and be treated as an illegal entrant.

Most asylum applicants detected at ports of entry had no identifying documentation but it was not legally or physically possible to detain all those who arrived. A new team to counter the growing trend of facilitation of asylum and illegal entry at seaports, both clandestine and documentary abuse, was created at Dover in 1994. The Facilitation Support Unit (FSU) was jointly staffed by the Immigration Service and Kent Police. The unit developed expertise in bringing prosecutions against those people smuggling illegal entrants. A report to the Home Affairs Select Committee in 2001 said,

"In 1999, the FSU investigated 299 incidents and arrested 410 persons suspected of facilitating a total of 1,803 illegal entrants/asylum claimants. In the same period, 105 trials were completed involving 120 defendants and resulting in 106 convictions. Custodial sentences exceeding 172 years were imposed".

The efforts made to identify and document the arriving asylum seekers were vital to the end of the process where an application was refused. Without proof of identity, nationality and inbound carrier it was very much more difficult to document and remove the person. Fingerprinting of asylum seekers was a key part of this process, and was being considered by 1991. Legal powers to fingerprint asylum seekers were finally given within the 1993 Asylum and Immigration Act Opponents expressed the view that this criminalised asylum seekers.

In 1983 the total Immigration detention space available to the Immigration Service was approximately 180 spaces located at the major London airports. Elsewhere, other ports made use of local prison spaces. The existing facilities were designed to cater for short stay cases of people soon to be removed from the country having been refused at a port of entry.

By 1987 it was recognised that the available space was inadequate and an attempt was made to address this by use of a floating detention vessel, (see above). The failure of the Earl William meant that the numbers of those who had to be released on temporary admission, (immigration bail), grew. The opening of Campsfield House Detention Centre in 1993 provided 200 extra spaces. The expansion led to a more centralised management of the detention estate whereas before the centres had largely been managed by the airports that they served. On 25 May 1995 the total number of people held in immigration detention centres was recorded as 381 with a further 508 being held in prisons under immigration powers.

The pressure on the detention estate continued to grow during the 1990s. As detention usage grew so did the costs - £7.76m in 1993/4 rising to £17.8m by 1996/97. Tinsley House, which opened in 1996 at Gatwick, was the first purpose-built immigration detention centre.

=== 1997–2001: Expansion and modernisation ===
==== Fairer, Faster, Firmer ====
In 1998, the new Labour administration published a white paper titled Fairer, faster and firmer - a modern approach to immigration and asylum which promised an expansion of the detention estate. The result was a flurry of Public Finance Initiatives to build centres at Oakington, (Cambridge), Yarlswood (Bedford), Dungavel, (Scotland) and a new expanded centre at Harmondsworth near Heathrow which increased the overall capacity by over 1500. Expansion brought the total capacity of immigration detention centres to approximately 2,800 by 2005. This massive expansion was driven by the need to maintain control not only of people arriving in the UK who had been refused, but also by the dramatic rise of enforcement within the UK over the period. The removal of those whose asylum claims had failed became the top priority but the job of tracing and detaining failed asylum seekers was only the beginning of an often tortuous process of dealing with many barriers to their removal. These included renewed applications, resurrected appeals, judicial review, MPs representations, applications to stay on the basis of marriage, human rights appeals on the basis of family ties and the problems associated with obtaining travel documentation that would actually allow the removal to take place. Maintaining control of the person during this process was seen as essential to successfully enforcing immigration removals for adults.

The announcement in 1998 that IND had published its instructions on the internet was a tangible sign that the organisation was looking to the future possibilities offered by the IT revolution and was set for modernisation. The document "Fairer, faster, firmer" outlined what it considered to be the failings of the previous decade and set out its ideas for the future. One of the major successes of recent times had been the establishment by the Immigration Service of a team of Airline Liaison Officers whose job was to stop inadmissible passengers at their point of departure abroad. The first of these had been posted to New Delhi as long before as 1993 and quickly established good links with local police and immigration officials. There were some notable successes and, although undocumented arrivals had risen by 17% the previous year, this was not the case where the ALO's were deployed. In 1998 ALO's in five locations, working under a code of conduct ratified by the Air Transport Association Control Authority Working Group, prevented 2095 passengers travelling with suspect documentation. In 1999, 4999 inadmissible passenger were identified in 17 locations. By 2001, 57 ALO's had been deployed abroad.

Another key change was a reappraisal of how and when people should be notified of their permission to enter the UK. This work was conducted under the banner “flexibility” and reconsidered how it was best to give people permission to enter, whether it was still necessary in all cases and whether permission could be granted as part of the visa process abroad. This was part of a move to modernise working processes at ports which had barely changed in their basics since 1962. The general aims, as reported to the Home Affairs Select Committee, were to speed up passenger flows and to make better use of data supplied by carriers to identify facilitators and racketeers. Flexibility was contained in the Immigration (Leave to Enter and Remain) Order 2000 and came into effect 30 July 2000. It paved the way for:

- advance clearance to enter the UK for low risk groups such as tour parties
- permission to enter to be given in writing, by fax, electronically or orally
- permission to be given through a third party rather than directly
- for the control can be operated abroad
- capacity to keep pace with new developments such as identification by use of biometrics.

There were moves to set up a more joined up intelligence network, based on the police's National Intelligence Model, whose intention was to ensure " that information is fully researched, developed and analysed to provide intelligence which enables senior managers to provide strategic direction, make tactical resourcing decisions about operational matters and manage risk". It was planned to expand the use of fingerprinting and, for enforcement, there was a major change of direction with ambitious plans to train immigration officers to make use of their powers of arrest, give them more powers of search and make them less reliant on police resources. These were just a few items on a lengthy programme of changes, backed up by substantial promises of money and legislative time in Parliament. The document was a serious statement of intent and bore the hallmarks of a small organisation evolving into a larger and very much more professional organisation but, at its heart, was a central IT project that was intended to be the hub of all the administration of casework within the Croydon HQ.

==== IND Casework Programme ====
In 1995 IND entered into an agreement with an IT consortium to develop a new computer system. The IND casework programme was a Private Finance Initiative, (PFI) agreed between IND and an IT consortium led by Siemens Business Services signed in 1996 and scheduled for completion in 1998. It was a well meant but ultimately over ambitious venture intended to provide the department with a “paperless” office where cases, especially asylum cases, would be electronically prioritised and actioned without the old fashioned processes involving transport and storage of thousands of paper based files.

The delivery of the IT system in 1998 was delayed but there was an interim rollout of a computer network in readiness and the old caseworking teams were disbanded. These included the various teams such as those dealing with deportation of foreign national criminals and the teams which had provided support to the Immigration Service at ports and in enforcement. The assumption behind the programme was that these specialisms would be absorbed within the new multi-skilled teams. The reorganisation which started in December 1998 had an immediate impact in that the system ground to halt. Urgent steps were taken to restore some kind of service but the infrastructure that had previously supported the thousands of enquiries, the requests for return of passports for travel, the MPs representations, enquiries from Courts, Prisons and legal representatives, the review procedures that allowed the Immigration Service to continue with removals – had all been seriously damaged or destroyed. Efforts were made to repair the damage against the expectation that all would be well once the promised IT system was actually rolled out. In early 2001, as reported by Computer Weekly at the time, Siemens conceded that they were unable to deliver the IT system that was supposed to form the heart of the process. The impact on IND of dismantling its administrative machine and losing experienced staff while dealing with a continuing rise in workload was catastrophic.

==== Home Affairs Committee report of January 2001 ====
By 2000, the height of IND's administrative crisis coincided with a new peak in asylum claims of 76,040. In February 2000 the Parliamentary Home Affairs Select Committee, (HAC), started a wide-ranging enquiry into the reasons for the rise in asylum and the way that IND and the Immigration Service had handled the issues. During the course of collating evidence for the enquiry the HAC visited the Red Cross centre at Sangatte near Calais and saw for themselves the numbers of would-be refugees waiting to try and enter the UK clandestinely. The issues were pushed higher up the political agenda by an awful tragedy that took place on 19 June that year when 58 Chinese people were found dead in the back of a sealed lorry at Dover. The Dutch driver was later charged with manslaughter. The deaths of the Chinese people at Dover brought about a new focus on the fact that the trafficking of people was now more than the exploitation of displaced people by opportunistic individuals it was the now (in this instance Triad based) organised crime. The HAC discussed what they described as the "pull factor", what it was that made Britain an attractive destination relative to other countries and what might be done to reduce this.

Another event in February 2000 also raised the political profile of asylum seekers. A group of nine Afghan nationals hijacked an aircraft and forced it to fly to Stansted Airport. They and 79 of the passengers claimed asylum. The Afghan hijackers case was to become a political headache that highlighted the lack of powers the Home Office actually had. The then–Home Secretary, Jack Straw, promised tough action but, a court ruled in 2004 that, under Article 3 of the European Convention on Human Rights, they could not be sent back to Afghanistan because their lives would be endangered. By 2006 the hijackers eventually won both their release and permission to stay in the UK. The ruling that allowed the hijackers to stay was described by the Prime Minister as an "abuse of common sense", and the Home Secretary blamed it on misinterpretation the Human Rights Act 1998 which had come into force in 2000. The Joint Committee on Human Rights defended the decision and was itself critical of ministers' comments.

The HAC report noted the underlying issues of staffing within Immigration Service operational areas between 1995 and 2000 where numbers had been frozen or reduced. The HAC welcomed the plans to expand staff numbers. In fact, numbers were set to rise rapidly as new money was allocated. IND having reduced staff in the 1990s, quickly recruited 850 new staff and between 1997 and 2003 staff in IND would rise from 5000 to 11,000 The HAC was informed that on 1 July 2000 there were 2,567 staff in post in IS Ports Directorate and that this figure was due to increase to 3,050 by 31 March 2001.

The report saw an overarching need to join up the threads of law enforcement and recommended that people-smuggling should be treated as per any other area of organised crime and that the Immigration Service should develop joint intelligence cells to enable it to liaise more effectively with other law enforcement agencies. It noted as well that the controls on movement across Europe were only as strong as the weakest point within the member states and that 61% of forgeries were European documents.

Of the greatest long term significance was recommendation 14 to create a single border agency:

“We recommend that existing border control agencies should be combined into a single frontier force on the basis of secondment and direct employment, but with clear lines of communication back to the parent agencies. Pending the creation of a single frontier force, strategic co-direction of better joint working should be provided by a ministerial group to which the official Border Agencies Directors Group should report at least four times a year”.

==== Intelligence-led controls and organised crime ====
A new emphasis was emerging around the professional management of intelligence and the recognition that racketeering, facilitation and identity fraud were now big business rather than a back-street industry. Statistics for the later 1990s showed that the most commonly forged documents encountered at UK ports were EU documents. A report to the Home Affairs Committee by the IND Intelligence Section, (INDIS), noted that there was a general consensus among European law enforcement agencies that provision of such documents was being conducted on a commercial level and that,

“the gangs have transferred the knowledge, facilities and networks used for smuggling drugs and other commodities to a highly profitable new endeavour. Many actively recruit potential immigrants in source countries, provide escorts and safe houses en route and are increasingly providing support on arrival such as legal advice to lodge asylum applications. Opportunist illegal entry is becoming rarer. The trade is now firmly in the hands of organised crime”.

INDIS believed that the documents were targeted at the points of the immigration control that were perceived as weakest – in this case the British and European Union channels. This created a conflict with the idea of flexibility at the controls which sought to move passengers quickly. How this might have been resolved is now immaterial because outside events provided a new focus on the security of border controls with the attack on the World Trade Center in New York on 11 September 2001. The future emphasis was to be very much more stringent at the point where the traveller came into contact with border controls but the new thinking did have the effect of moving some of the consideration away from the airport queues. The reappraisal of the UK's security needs in the wake of 9/11 would ultimately lead to the creation of the Serious Organised Crime Agency.

The Service's primary investigative capability was created in 1999 as the Criminal Investigations Section (CIS). The CIS were charged with the investigation and prosecution of criminal offences borne out of abuse of immigration legislation. Focussing on marriage abuse, the CIS soon expanded into human trafficking and forgery & counterfeiting investigations. The CIS led the Service's investigation into the Yarlswood Detention Centre riots in 2001 and over a number of months was responsible for re-detaining almost all escapees. In 2003 the CIS was disbanded and reformed as the London Command Crime Group (LCCG) and moved from its central London offices to a new HQ in Croydon. Staffed by experienced UKIS investigators, former police officers, former HM Customs Officers and former Benefits Agency investigators, the 18-strong unit (1 HM Inspector, 3 Chief Immigration Officers and 14 Immigration Officers) was granted a number of additional powers traditionally reserved for police.

Better liaison and better intelligence started to bring rewards - Operation Gular disrupted a network responsible for smuggling over 400 people into the UK over a two-year period. Five men were sentenced to a total of 20 years as a result of closer working with the French authorities.

=== 2002–2005: Asylum starts to wane and Tipping the Balance ===
==== Secure Borders, Safe Haven ====
In 2002 Immigrations Service Ports Directorate achieved its highest number of refusals at the border ever, 50,362 as compared with 17,220 refusals at port in 1994. The gradual impact of more visas being issued abroad and the greater emphasis on screening people pre-entry reduced the figure, as did the general fall in non-EEA passenger from its peak in 2000. By 2004, 31,930 passengers were refused entry at port and subsequently removed and, in 2010 the figure had markedly fallen to 18,276.

In February 2002 the government published the white paper Secure Borders, Safe Haven. In many ways this was a continuation of the modernisation policies set out in its predecessor Fairer, Firmer, Faster in that it outlined plans for more electronic mechanisation of the controls such as iris recognition, heartbeat sensors, backscatter X-ray and gamma ray scanners which would be used at Dover and Coquelles to spot hidden illegal entrants. The new technology would be used, to speed through frequent travellers so that resources were better targeted at those more likely to present a problem. The document went beyond the creation of new technologies though and has to be seen in the context of its time. Numbers of new asylum seekers peaked in 2002 at 84,130, keeping the issue of asylum firmly at the top of the political agenda. It was a document that highlighted the changes in thinking and social attitudes that had taken place since the 1950s and 1960s when the background social policy assumptions had centred on the concept of assimilation. That idea had been replaced by multiculturalism and social cohesion. The document set out ideas as to how the difficult balance could be struck between controlling migration, promoting cultural acceptance, combating social exclusion and promoting a cohesive, modern sense of what it meant to be British.

The document advocated a policy of "managed immigration" to allow more people to enter the UK legally, (especially for work), and tougher mechanisms and rules to prevent those working illegally. It linked immigration policy to an oft repeated assertion that migration provided a positive resource for the economy. The white paper said,

"Migration is an inevitable reality of the modern world and it brings significant benefits. But to ensure that we sustain the positive contribution of migration to our social well-being and economic prosperity, we need to manage it properly and build firmer foundations on which integration with diversity can be achieved", and;

“The Government will initiate and open and constructive debate about citizenship, civic identity and shared values”.

The practical intention was to seek to drive asylum applications down by a carrot and stick approach. The "pull" factors which encouraged asylum seekers to come to Britain would be reduced, (by, for instance, removing access to support for destitute asylum seekers who did not claim asylum immediately upon arrival), and an incentive to follow the mainstream immigration route would be encouraged by relaxing the rules on those coming to work. This would test the assumption that most asylum applicants were actually economic migrants and that by freeing up the legal labour market it would take the heat away from the asylum pressure-cooker.

The rules on young people coming for “working holidays” were to be relaxed and a new, “Seasonal Agricultural Workers Scheme” introduced which would be extended across the economy with set quotas for industries short of labour. Under the scheme a worker could stay up to six months but would have no right to bring dependants. The work permit scheme would be extended to those with medium skills from outside the EU coming for a specific job. Permit holders would be able to apply to stay in Britain after four years.

The changes were introduced by the Nationality, Immigration and Asylum Act 2002. The most controversial area was that of cutting off support to asylum seekers. The Refugee Council said that the law would “"potentially affect the lives and wellbeing of thousands of asylum applicants in the UK forcing them into extreme poverty and making it more difficult to pursue their asylum application". This aspect of the law was challenged and, in 2004, the European Court held that it breached Article 3 of the European Convention on Human Rights and the policy was dropped.

Despite these future setbacks the numbers of asylum seekers started to fall. This was brought about by many factors, the better casework processes, faster removal rates, new appeal regulations and other factors such as the 33,000 people who were denied boarding in 2003 by Airline Liaison Officers abroad. During the 1990s the Airline Liaison Officers had been an essential component in preventing undocumented passengers reaching the UK and driving down asylum claims, (see previous sections). The impact was significant - numbers of Inadequately Documented Arrivals (IDAs) detected after arriving by air fell from 14,071 in 2003 to 6,831 in 2005. This though was only one of the measures taken to regain control of the border together with more casework and enforcement staff, restricted public benefits, improved casework processes and streamlined appeals procedures. The ALO network underlined the benefits of driving down the routes which organised criminal facilitators could exploit and more thought and effort went into refining these ideas and tightening the control. New IT support tools were introduced including::

- Heartbeat technology - special sensors to detect and analyse clandestine movements within freight vehicles via the vehicle chassis and superstructure,
- X/Gamma ray scanners and carbon dioxide sensors used to detect the exhaled breath of clandestine entrants in the trailers of vehicles.

In 2003, 3,482 clandestine entrants had been detected at the on-entry controls; in 2005 this had been reduced to 1,588. More effort was directed into de-briefing new asylum seekers during initial screening to gather intelligence about the facilitators and routes used. In 2005 Iris screening underwent live testing at ports for the first time.

The downward trajectory was steep enough to prompt the Prime Minister Tony Blair when speaking at the 2004 Labour Party Conference to set a target for IND and the Immigration Service that, by 2006, the numbers of failed asylum seekers removed from the UK would exceed the numbers of new applications. This became known as the “Tipping The Balance” target and the work to meet the target became the organisation's top priority.

==== Development of child protection ====
The role of immigration staff in child protection was already long recognised as a high priority by the Immigration Service at ports and during enforcement operations where, for foreign children coming to the UK, they might be the only government officials with whom they come into contact. Although mechanisms already existed to work with police and social services a new initiative was launched in 2003. The Metropolitan Police and Immigration Service, together with other government welfare agencies and the NSPCC, piloted an operation known as "Operation Paladin Child" to monitor the arrival of unaccompanied children at Heathrow Airport. Social services were asked to undertake assessments of any child meeting certain criteria. The operation, as well as addressing an important issue, had the wider benefit of building an understanding between social workers and law enforcement officers of each other's needs.

Between August and November 2003, 1,738 unaccompanied children arrived from non-EU countries. Most of these were travelling legitimately for education or holidays but a small number of children gave 'grave cause for concern' and police were subsequently unable to locate 12 of the children. IS at Heathrow Airport led the way in the UK in setting up sensitive and sophisticated reception arrangements for children and developed facilities and training to identify children at risk. A programme of specialist training for immigration officers in dealing with children at risk resulted in 495 immigration officers being trained in interviewing children by 2006.

==== EU accession and ministerial resignation ====
2004 saw the arrival of ten new countries into the EU, Cyprus, Malta, Czech Republic, Estonia, Hungary, Latvia, Lithuania, Poland, Slovakia and Slovenia. This represented a continued shift away from freedom of movement that was multi-racial and multi-cultural to one that was only involving white-nations with Europe. The government predicted that 15,000 new workers would arrive in the UK but, by 2006 around 430,000 had registered for work and this rose to 683,000 by 2007, 70% of which were from Poland. The history of Polish migration to the United Kingdom gives an indicator of why Poles predominated so much. A large number of Polish citizens had been allowed to settle after the Second World War in a resettlement programme for those who had no wish to live under the new Communist Polish regime, (see earlier section).

The possibility that numbers might cause alarm seems to have been acknowledged by the Home Office who fast tracked visa applications in Romania and Bulgaria between 2002 and 2004. A later Home Office investigation showed that junior staff had taken short cuts to clear a back-log. The National Audit Office expressed concern at the lack of checks that had been conducted and the Home Secretary admitted that the system had been “insufficiently robust”. It transpired that warnings had been given by the visa issuing post in Sofia that checks on applications were being waived in London against their wishes.

The Immigration Minister Bev Hughes told the BBC and the House of Commons that she had been unaware of the allegations but later confirmed that she, or her office, had been notified of the problems 18 months before and that she had inadvertently misled the House.

Having grossly underestimated the numbers for the first eight countries there was concern about allowing unlimited access to Romania and Bulgaria when they joined. A particularly unexpected aspect of those coming was the impact on child benefit payments with 68,000 new applications. Restrictions were placed on Romanian and Bulgarian citizens when they joined in 2007 which slowed their flow into the job market. Concerns among some government agencies about benefit fraud by EEA citizens and concerns within the National Health Service (NHS) about illicit "health tourism" by foreign nationals meant that closer working and "joined up" government became newly fashionable concepts; but the constraints of the Data Protection Act and the nervousness of government agencies in identifying foreign nationals meant that progress in tackling identity fraud would be slow.

The impact for the Immigration Service was not so much the new arrivals as the opportunities that their national documents presented for fraud. A growing number of migrants from neighbouring countries used fraudulently obtained “accession” documents as a means of entering the UK. The wider impact on IND and the Home Office was to undermine the positive work that had been achieved in restoring its reputation in the wake of the asylum crisis and once again damage its credibility and operational integrity.

==== One Step Ahead and dealing with organised crime ====
The 2004 white paper “One Step Ahead - A 21st Century Strategy to Defeat Organised Crime” set out, among other things the role and responsibilities of the new Serious Organised Crime Agency in tackling organised crime. The paper made it clear that it was intended that the various agencies already working together on these issues would do so ever more closely but that there was no need to create a new border agency.

“In light of the creation of the Serious Organised Crime Agency and the opportunity for that new body to establish close working partnerships with the existing border agencies, it is not proposed to create a single border agency”

The agency, SOCA, would be a “non-departmental public body”. Rather ambiguously, the paper said that although the Home Secretary would be “accountable to parliament for the agencies performance”... “The Agency will enjoy full operational independence from Ministers”. The arms length relationship that agencies’ provided clearly had attractions and may have provided a model for the future of IND.

=== Controlling Our Borders: the 2005 five-year plan ===
The high level thinking around security and intelligence meant that, even without the July 7th terrorist bombings that year, there was a new appetite for greater cooperation and better use of data.

The 2005 white paper “Controlling Our Borders - Making Migration Work for Britain” outlined the new “e-Borders” programme;

“a joined up modernised intelligence-led border control and security framework” to “allow Immigration Service and other agencies including Police, Customs and Excise, Security Services to work more closely together”.

It went on to explain how this would be achieved;

“The e-Borders systems will collect both arrivals and departure information … Carriers will provide advance passenger information (API) and passenger name records (PNR) electronically. Passenger details (including names, dates of birth, nationality and travel document details) will be checked against multi-agency watchlists prior to boarding a flight….we will have a much clearer picture of passengers’ movements in and out of the country. This wealth of information will help border control, law enforcement and intelligence agencies, and other Government departments to target their activity”.

This was a hugely ambitious project to join up various agencies and use both public and private data, both inside and outside the UK, in ways that had never been attempted before. It had already started in 2004 as Project Semaphore which was to test the principles in a limited way and act as a proof of concept for the full implementation of e-Borders. Semaphore went beyond the theoretical though – it would actually start producing data on routes of interest.

“Controlling our Borders” also outlined two other planks that were to underpin future strategy. The Points Based System for issuing visas would not become reality until 2007 but was already in planning. More immediate was the “New Asylum Model”, (NAM), for dealing with asylum applications. This was a combination of existing fast track processes, which would be extended, and another attempt at single owner caseworking whose aim was to ensure continuity through the entire decision-making process. Caseworkers would be expected to perform a far wider range of duties including the presentation of case at appeal hearings and the casework surrounding a person's removal. The new casework teams would be the machine that would track and manage failed asylum seekers towards removal as a “ready to go product” in much the manner championed by the Home Affairs Committee.

=== 2007–2008: Border and Immigration Agency to UK Border Agency ===
The events of 2006 involving the foreign prisoners crisis prompted a "re-branding" exercise combined with the move to turn IND into an executive agency. Since 1999 a great deal of legislative time, resources and development capital had been allocated to immigration issues. The mistakes that led to the resignation of Beverley Hughes and Charles Clarke led to consideration of whether more fundamental change was required.

The Border and Immigration Agency was created on 1 April 2007. This was not the unified border force that had been recommended by the Home Affairs Committee in 2001. The creation of the new agency took place in the wake of the Foreign National Prisoners scandal. The publicly stated benefits were that the agency would be more accountable. The key organisational change was that of regionalisation. The new agency would be divided into six new regions each under the command of a Director. Border staff would not be regionalised as their workforce was inextricably tethered to ports in London and the South East. The Immigration Service Ports Directorate would, for the first time, be uniformed. The case for regionalisation was set out on the basis that local teams would form closer links with other regional government offices and with local communities. The Unions suspected another motive of creating an environment where national pay scales would be ended in favour of local rates.

The fate of Immigration Service enforcement staff was unclear. They already had a regional structure but the directorate was again disbanded and reorganised along a new regional structure. The central management structures for enforcement were disbanded and their functions dispersed. As the new agency was created so the Immigration Service ceased to exist but their functions continued under a new umbrella organisation called the Border and Immigration Agency. On 1 July the Prime Minister, Gordon Brown, announced that he was going to: "reform the UK's border arrangements, integrating the work of Customs, the Border and Immigration Agency and UKvisas, overseas and at the main points of entry to the UK, and establishing a unified border force".

The Cabinet Office quickly published a "review" document "Establishing the UK's new border arrangements".

=== 2010–present: Home Office hostile environment policy ===
The UK introduced point based system following the Brexit and it came to effect on 1st of January 2021. It ended free movement of EU citizens and created a single immigration system.

In November 2025, the UK announced a significant change in the immigration model and introduced 'Earned Settlement' framework. It doubled the standard qualifying period for permanent settlement (Indefinite Leave to Remain) to 10 years for most migrants with a few exemptions. The period to settlement was set to 10 year as default with favourable characteristics reducing the waiting time and unfavourable characteristics increasing it (for example, longer periods of 15–30 years for low-paid workers, benefit claimants, and illegal entrants and reductions for high contributors such as NHS doctors and nurses (5 years), high earners, entrepreneurs, and those demonstrating strong integration).
