= Zamir v Secretary of State for the Home Department =

1980 British legal case

- Court: House of Lords
- Decided: 17 July 1980
- Citation: [1980] UKHL 14

Court membership
- Judges sitting: Lord Wilberforce; Viscount Dilhorne; Lord Salmon; Lord Fraser of Tullybelton; Lord Russell of Killowen

Keywords
- Immigration; duty of candour

Zamir v Secretary of State for the Home Department [1980] UKHL 14 is a House of Lords case concerning immigration law.

== Facts ==
On 11 December 1972, Zamir, a boy from Pakistan then aged 15, applied for permission to enter the United Kingdom to join his father, who had been settled in England since 1962. Zamir declared on his application form that he was unmarried which at that time was true. His application was denied, and he appealed. Nearly three years later, on 25 November 1975, his application was granted.

On 10 February 1976, Zamir got married, and on 2 March 1976, then aged 18, he arrived at Heathrow Airport. He presented his passport with his visa and the immigration officer gave him leave to enter the UK for an indefinite period. Zamir's passport was stamped accordingly.

On 31 July 1978, Zamir's wife applied to enter the UK, and the legality of Zamir's original entry into the UK came into question. The Home Office's position was that Zamir's application for immigration had been granted on the basis that he was unmarried and fully dependent on his father's income, and he owed a duty of candour to disclose his marriage. Zamir's position was that his marriage was not arranged until several weeks after he received his visa and nobody had asked him about marriage.

On 2 October 1978, Zamir was detained. The Home Office meant to remove him from the UK. Zamir applied for a writ of habeas corpus.

== Law ==
Paragraph 16(2) of sch 2 to the Immigration Act 1971 reads: "A person in respect of whom directions may be given under any of paragraphs 8 to 14 above may be detained under the authority of an immigration officer pending the giving of directions and pending his removal in pursuance of any directions given".

== Courts below ==
The Queen's Bench Divisional Court and the Court of Appeal both refused Zamir's application for habeas corpus.

== Judgment ==
The House of Lords dismissed Zamir's appeal. The Home Office could continue to detain him.

== Significance ==
People who apply to enter the United Kingdom are under a continuing duty of candour about all facts material to their immigration. This means that if they make a declaration on their application form, and the facts then change, they must inform the immigration authorities.
