= Alien Office =

The Alien Office was formed in 1793 to implement the Aliens Act 1793, which was the first statutory control of foreign visitors created to control the influx of French refugees and suspected revolutionaries. It was created as sub-department of the Home Office, which itself had only come into existence in 1782. The first Superintendent of Aliens appointed was William Huskisson. In July 1798, the Alien Office relocated from the Home Office building in Whitehall to 20 Crown Street, Westminster which ran parallel to Downing Street.

Although ostensibly part of the Home Office, its wider remit included the domestic and external surveillance of foreign people of interest. The Alien Office was part of the wider Government machinery of national security and intelligence, and its work needs to be seen in the context of this and of other legislation passed at the time, such as the Westminster Police Bill in 1792 (which created a system of stipendiary magistrates as part of an attempt to coordinate policing). William Wickham was appointed Superintendent of the Alien Office, in succession to Huskisson, in the summer of 1794. During Wickham's tenure, the office was enlarged in 1798 and, until his departure in 1802, it was, in reality, a functioning intelligence agency. Elizabeth Sparrow describes it as "the first comprehensive British secret service in the modern sense, [and] therefore the forerunner of not only Special Operations Executive (S.O.E.) but also the euphemistically named Military Intelligence (M.I.5 and M.I.6)". The most famous scalp claimed by the Alien Office under the new regulations was arguably that of the French diplomat and intriguer, Talleyrand. In March 1794 Talleyrand was told to leave the country within five days.

In 1803 John Reeves became Superintendent, serving until 1814. After 1816 and the advent of peace, the role of the Alien Office seemed unclear and arguably unnecessary. Between 1816 and 1826 only 17 people were deported, whereas, during the 1790s, there had been around 50 per year. After 1816 the law had been sparingly used, primarily to deport members of Bonaparte's inner circle. Between 1821 and 1826 there was only one deportation, destined to be the last for 75 years.

The end of the Alien Office and its staff of registry clerks and messengers came with the Registration of Aliens Act 1836. This repealed the previous legislation and created a theoretical system of in-country registration that, although it would quickly fall into disuse, remained on the statute book until the Aliens Act 1905.

== Bibliography ==
- Dinwiddy, J.R. (1968). "The use of the Crown's power of deportation under the Alien Act 1793–1826". Bulletin of the Institute of Historical Research. 41 (104): 193–211. doi:10.1111/j.1468-2281.1968.tb01248.x.
- Sparrow, Elizabeth (1990). "The Alien Office, 1792–1806". Historical Journal. 33 (2): 361–84. doi:10.1017/S0018246X00013376. JSTOR 2639462. S2CID 159920365. (subscription required)
- Drowning a Fish - an unofficial history of UK immigration control 1793-1962, Bill Parsons, Createspace publishing, ISBN 978-1546712848
