= United Kingdom immigration law =

United Kingdom immigration law is the law that relates to who may enter, work in and remain in the United Kingdom. There are many reasons as to why people may migrate; the three main reasons being seeking asylum, because their home countries have become dangerous, people migrating for economic reasons and people migrating to be reunited with family members.

== History ==
Comprehensive regulation of immigration is a modern area of law, which grew particularly during the late 20th century as ordinary people became more globally mobile, and the United Kingdom became an increasingly attractive place to live and work. The original inhabitants of the British Isles are thought to be Celtic, though for centuries people from surrounding countries had come to settle. Notably, the Roman conquest of 50BC brought many Latin settlers, the Viking expansion around Scandinavia brought many people of that origin from the 8th century to the 11th century, and the Norman conquest of England from 1066 established that the original monarchy from north France. After that, laws were sparse. The common law recognised a general distinction between aliens and citizens, and a citizen would be someone born in England, or a dominion. Soon, the Status of Children Born Abroad Act 1350 allowed children born abroad to two English parents to be English. Moreover, the British Nationality Act 1772 allowed people to be considered English if their father was, although born abroad. Others would generally need permission to migrate. One of the earliest statutes was the Egyptians Act 1530, which stated that "people calling themselves Egyptians", though actually gypsies were to be expelled because they had engaged in crafty trickery, by telling fortunes. Another piece of targeted legislation was the Jewish Naturalisation Act 1753, passed at the insistence of Whig members of Parliament to allow people of Jewish origin to settle in Britain in return for Jewish support against the Jacobite rising. It was, however, repealed a year later.

One of the first modern statutes was aimed at restricting Jewish immigration, following religious persecution in Russia. The Aliens Act 1905 required registration and placed general controls under the authority of the Home Secretary.

- Calvin's Case (1608) 77 ER 377
- W. Blackstone, Commentaries on the Laws of England (1765) Book 1, ch X, 374

== Migration by background ==
=== European Union / European Economic Area / Switzerland ===
Prior to the end of the Brexit implementation/transition period:

- TFEU article 45
- Directive 2004/38/EC, implemented in the UK by:
  - Immigration (European Economic Area) Regulations 2006
  - Immigration (European Economic Area) Regulations 2016

From the end of the Brexit implementation period:

- Part Two of the Brexit withdrawal agreement, as implemented in the UK by:
  - the European Union Settlement Scheme - formally, Limited Leave to Remain under Appendix EU to the Immigration Rules (pre-settled status) / Indefinite Leave to Remain (ILR) under Appendix EU to the Immigration Rules (settled status)

=== Commonwealth and former members ===
- British nationality law and the Republic of Ireland
- Ireland Act 1949
- Commonwealth Immigrants Act 1962
- Commonwealth Immigrants Act 1968, restricted the right of entry to people having one parent or grandparent who was a British subject or citizen with the right to live in the United Kingdom
- British Nationality Selection Scheme, for people from Hong Kong between 1990 and 1997
- Immigration, Asylum and Nationality Act 2006

=== Rest of the world ===
- UK Borders Act 2007

== Permission to migrate ==
- Immigration Act 1971 is the primary statute dealing with migration system of the country.
  - Right of abode (United Kingdom), a right to live in the UK, for citizens, some other British nationals and some Commonwealth citizens, detailed in the 1971 act.
  - The Immigration Rules, implemented pursuant to the 1971 act, containing the lengthy and frequently-changed details of the migration system.
- Borders, Citizenship and Immigration Act 2009, amending the 1971 act, among other laws
- Immigration and Asylum Act 1999, amending the 1971 act, among other laws

=== Work visas ===
- Worker Registration Scheme
- Work permit (United Kingdom)
- Points-based immigration system (United Kingdom) replacing a system including the Highly Skilled Migrant Programme
- Beoku-Betts v Secretary of State for the Home Department [2008] UKHL 39
- Chikwamba v Secretary of State for the Home Department [2008] UKHL 40
- N v United Kingdom [2008] ECHR 453
- Migrant domestic workers
- Kalayaan (charity)

=== Leave to remain ===
- Nationality, Immigration and Asylum Act 2002
- Life in the United Kingdom test, a requirement to get Indefinite Leave to Remain or naturalisation as a British citizen.

=== Citizenship ===
- British Nationality Act 1981
- British Nationality Act 1948, affects people born or naturalised before 1983

=== Asylum ===
- R (European Roma Rights Centre) v Immigration Officer at Prague Airport [2004] UKHL 55, racial profiling by UK immigration officials held to be ultimately lawful.
- HJ (Iran) and HT (Cameroon) v Secretary of State for the Home Department [2010] UKSC 31, two men could claim asylum on the basis that they could suffer persecution for being gay in their home countries.

=== Illegal migration ===
- Illegal immigration to the United Kingdom
- MigrationWatch UK

== Enforcement ==
=== Executive agencies ===
- From 1920 to 1970, the Immigration Branch of the Home Office managed government policy towards migration. This became the UK Immigration Service, but was disbanded in 2007.
- The Immigration and Nationality Directorate became the Border and Immigration Agency in 2007, and then became the UK Border Agency from 2008.
- Now it is split in two departments, one is UK Visas & Immigration and Immigration Enforcement and Law Enforcement.

=== Tribunals and appeals ===
- Asylum and Immigration (Treatment of Claimants, etc.) Act 2004
- Asylum and Immigration Tribunal, transferred in 2007 to the Asylum and Immigration Chamber of the First-tier Tribunal created by the Tribunals, Courts and Enforcement Act 2007
- Special Immigration Appeals Commission, for high security cases

=== Criminal law ===
- Criminal Justice and Immigration Act 2008 ss 130-137

== Statistics ==
In 2007, net immigration to the UK was 237,000, a rise of 46,000 on 2006. In 2004 the number of people who became British citizens rose to 140,795, 12% on the previous year. In the 2001 Census, citizens from the Republic of Ireland were the largest foreign born group and have been for the last 200 years. This figure does not include those from Northern Ireland since it is part of the United Kingdom. Those of Irish ancestry number roughly 6 million from the first, second and third generations. The overwhelming majority of new citizens come from Asia (40%) and Africa (32%), the largest three groups being people from Pakistan, India and Somalia.

In 2011, an estimated 589,000 migrants arrived to live in the UK for at least a year, most of the migrants were people from Asia (particularly the Indian subcontinent) and Africa, while 338,000 people emigrated from the UK for a year or more. Following Poland's entry into the EU in May 2004 it was estimated that by the start of 2007, 375,000 Poles had registered to work in the UK, although the total Polish population in the UK was believed to be 500,000. Many Poles work in seasonal occupations and a large number are likely to move back and forth over time. Some migrants left after the world economic crisis of 2008. In 2011, citizens of the new EU member states made up 13% of immigrants.

== See also ==
- Visa requirements for British nationals
- Visa policy in the European Union
- UK labour law
- UK immigration enforcement
- UK Immigration Service
- Modern immigration to the United Kingdom
- Historical immigration to Great Britain
