= UK immigration enforcement =

United Kingdom government prevention of entry by foreign nationals

Since the creation of modern immigration controls in 1905, foreign nationals evading immigration control or committing crimes were regarded as a police matter and those people arrested were put before the courts whereupon they would be prosecuted and go through the deportation process. The United Kingdom Immigration Service's enforcement arm evolved gradually from the early 1970s onwards to meet demand from police for assistance in dealing with foreign national offenders and suspected immigration offenders within the UK. The wider history of UK immigration control is dealt with under UK immigration control - history.

== Immigration enforcement within the UK from 1962 ==
=== 1962–1973: Limitations of in-country enforcement ===
The Commonwealth Immigrants Act 1962 placed new restrictions on British Commonwealth citizens entering the UK and was seen as severe at the time. While it allowed conditions to be imposed on those previously allowed free entry it provided no powers concerning those who evaded the border controls altogether.

"A person shall not be required to submit to examination ... after the expiration of the period of twenty-four hours from the time when he lands in the United Kingdom. …" (Para 2 Sch1, Commonwealth Citizens Act 1962).

This was partially addressed by the Commonwealth Immigrants Act 1968 after which Commonwealth citizens were required by law to submit to immigration control on arrival. However, for those that evaded the border controls, the law stipulated that there were only 28 days in which to apprehend them. In the event of their being captured the person was awarded an in-country right of appeal that would mean they could not immediately be removed.

The Immigration Act 1971 removed the 28-day limit and created a right of appeal that could only be exercised from abroad. It also attempted to define the concept of illegal entry but it was only by testing the law through various judgements and challenges that the principle was established that someone arriving illegally did not have to go through the judicial process and deportation consideration, they could be "administratively" removed on the direction of an immigration officer acting on the authority of the Secretary of State. The evidence of the need for new powers was provided in a parliamentary question from 1972 which gave the bald facts that 13 people had been successfully prosecuted in the previous 12 months for facilitating illegal entry and 10 people had been treated as illegal entrants. Following the passage of the Immigration Act 1971, action to detect immigration offenders in the community was still considered a police matter and largely limited to the detection of seamen deserters, absconders from ports or those who were the subject of deportation orders. The powers in the 1971 Act focussed on the offences of overstaying and assumed that those who did so would be prosecuted and deported. Although it defined what an illegal entrant was, it did not provide sufficient clarity as to how the law should be applied. The concept of illegal entry as laid out in the 1971 Act did not extend to those who simply presented false documents or deceived the immigration officer on arrival about what they were going to do. It was only by establishing legal precedent through judgments’ that a consistent set of powers emerged.

=== 1973–1985: Formation of enforcement teams ===
Control of immigration in the UK was, until the 1980s almost exclusively focussed on border control. The law regarding the treatment of immigration offenders within the UK was unclear and would not start being resolved until the mid-1970s. Efforts made to extend controls at the border contrasted sharply with the lack of powers to deal with those who evaded them. The Labour government of 1974-79 maintained a policy of opposing internal immigration controls in favour of putting more resource into the border control and visa offices abroad.

The police who dealt with foreign nationals acted according to whether the person had been posted "wanted" or not and were reliant on Home Office records of who had overstayed. The police set up their own Immigration Intelligence Unit in October 1972. The Immigration Act prosecutions recorded at the time are then police prosecutions rather than Immigration Service ones. The police enjoyed some success in this work but a clear need emerged for the Immigration Service and police to cooperate and immigration enforcement offices evolved in the early 1970s to meet this need.

After the new Act came into force in 1973 more effort was directed to the detection and removal of illegal entrants. The Act was based on a concept of illegal entry which assumed illegal entry via clandestine landings. This had some basis in fact given the incentive within the 1962 Act to enter this way but even with the new laws it was a slow start; the total number of illegal entrants, overstayers and seamen deserters detected and removed in 1973 was reported as 44 but, in 1977, when answering a question on the numbers of deportees in 1973 the minister stated that 147 had been removed. Early immigration enforcement statistics are difficult to interpret as the terms "illegal entrant" and "illegal migrant" seem to have been used interchangeably and, at various times, encompassed overstayers, deportees AND illegal entrants which are all different types of offender in later reports. The lack of a cohesive enforcement structure must have played a part in this confusion but, overall, the numbers of enforced removals were very small.

Enforcement work was carried out by Immigration Officers who were otherwise normally engaged on passport controls at ports. In London, the main enforcement offices were based at Harmondsworth near Heathrow Airport and at Adelaide House, London Bridge. Duties at the Port of London included dealing with passengers and crew, interviewing foreign criminals in London prisons, attending court and making visits to private addresses to talk to people about their status or circumstances. Later in the 1970s, Immigration Officers were diverted to interview people in relation to their applications made under the amnesties of the time.

The Immigration Service Intelligence Unit in Harmondsworth, which had 29 officers by 1976, was responsible for managing the Immigration Service Intelligence database and assisting the police. By 1980 major operations were possible and were being mounted with particular emphasis on the hotel and restaurant trade.

=== 1985–1993: Growth, specialisation and PACE ===
Enforcement work became increasingly diverse and relatively more sophisticated during the 1980s. The London offices developed specialist teams targeting foreign vice trade workers, marriage fraud and West Indian gang crime. The central London office worked closely with police to play a key role in the detention and removal of a number of high-profile "Yardies" and other criminals associated with Jamaican drug crime. Combatting bogus colleges, (already noted above), was also an ongoing theme in enforcement work with some particular successes, including the closure of the "Advanced College of Business and Cultural Studies" where 63 people were arrested. Another regular source of work was the "marriage visit" to a home address to test whether the relationship was a Sham marriage. Marriage abuse was, and is, an embedded feature of immigration enforcement work and the Enforcement Directorate sought to combat it directly by allowing specialist teams to develop. "Operation Goldring" was a long running exercise operated by a central London unit at Isis House in the late 1980s early 1990s.

In 1992, the Immigration Service was split to form separate Ports and Enforcement Directorates. The split did not immediately solve the issue of those "hybrid" ports which dealt with both areas of work. By later standards enforcement immigration officers were severely constrained. Lack of radio or telephone communications meant that they were heavily reliant on police support. Although immigration officers were conferred powers of arrest under the 1971 Act they did not use these as a matter of policy and they were reliant of police officers and police facilities to perform their duties. When conducting pro-active investigations to private addresses immigration officers would take the lead in identifying immigration offenders and ask police to execute the arrest on their behalf.

Those offenders thus detected would be interviewed at a police station under caution. A large proportion of available resource was dedicated to responding to police requests for assistance. By 1989 the two main London offices at Isis House and ISIU Harmondsworth were responding to thousands of calls per year. The central London identified 1,402 offenders as a result of police call-outs in 1989 and ISIU 1,230.

In 1993 when a Jamaican woman Joy Gardner resisted having a deportation order enforced by an immigration officer and police in London, she died of suffocation after being gagged and having her head wrapped with tape. The incident and its subsequent investigation halted most pro-active immigration enforcement for a substantial period and was the cause of a reappraisal by police of their role in immigration enforcement which had far-reaching implications. The Metropolitan Police, and other forces, were concerned at the potential damage done to community trust and confidence. The police insisted on new safeguards and processes to better communicate the nature of joint operations and assess risks. Although police assistance continued to be the norm it was the beginning of a shift towards greater self-reliance by immigration enforcement.

In the 1990s there was a rapid increase in the numbers of immigration offenders claiming asylum shortly after arrest. Senior police officers expressed concern at the escalating use of police stations as places where immigration offenders were required to report having been released.

In 1993 asylum seekers were given the right of appeal before removal as part of the Immigration and Asylum Appeals Act 1993. The numbers of asylum applications began to rise. In 1993, 120 immigration officers undertook the enforcement work for the whole of the UK. It was recognised that to create an effective in-country control would require a raft of new legislation and a vast expansion of detention facilities and enforcement immigration officers. In 1992 Home Secretary, Kenneth Baker ruled out wider internal immigration controls.

=== 1994–1997: In-country asylum claims and focus on illegal working ===
The exact numbers claiming asylum when detected were not recorded, but the numbers who had to be released after detection rather than removed from the UK are available. Between 1994 and 1996 there is shown a rising trend in detection of illegal entrants but the numbers released on Temporary Admission increased steadily. People without legal qualification could function as immigration legal advisors; legal aid was available for immigration cases. Legal aid costs rose dramatically between 1988 and 1992 as did the numbers of applications for judicial review. By 1997 25% of all judicial reviews lodged were related to immigration cases.

Growing numbers of those detected were found working illegally, 10,000 in 1994 as opposed to fewer than 4,000 in 1988. Until 1997 it was illegal to undertake paid work only if employment was prohibited as a condition of entry; people who had entered illegally were not subject to this restriction, although they would if detected be arrested as illegal entrants. There was no sanction on employers employing an illegal entrant.

=== 1997–2001: Employer sanctions - impact of reorganisation ===
Section 8 of the Asylum Act of 1996 made it an offence to employ an illegal worker, with a potential fine of £5,000. Very few employers prosecuted were prosecuted.

The collapse of a Home Office IT project in 1999 had the effect of stopping the essential casework machinery that supported enforced removals. As part of the general restructuring that the crisis provoked the Immigration Service was again divided into two different management structures. The previous Ports Directorate and Enforcement Directorate were done away with and the service was partially regionalised under the command of "Immigration Service Regional Operations" and "Immigration Service SE Operations".

IND in Croydon, which had built up long-standing processes to liaise with prisons, courts and the Immigration Service in arranging the deportation of those who had been recommended for deportation by courts or whose removal was "conducive to the public good". However, by 1999 the processes for dealing with foreign criminals held within UK prisons awaiting deportation were under pressure. For enforcement offices, casework backlogs increased. By 2000 tentative steps were being taken to re-establish processes that had been removed. Despite the crisis within asylum casework, changes included modernisation and the continuation of vital longer-term strategic planning including the development of professional management skills and project management, the development of prosecutions capability, joint working with other agencies, the growth in numbers and prosecutions capability for arrest trained officers, (including use of the new powers contained in the Proceeds of Crime Act 2002 which allowed the confiscation of the criminal assets of traffickers, among others). The development of better IT systems continued. Neither did the hiatus stop the increasingly useful liaison work with police in combating organised crime. The disruption of West Indian organised or semi-organised crime continued to be a theme of immigration enforcement work with particular success in the early 2000s in dealing with Yardies. Immigration enforcement forged a close partnership with police and played an important role in the ongoing operation to combat black-on-black crime, Operation Trident which started in 1998.

=== 2001–2004: Development of arrest and prosecutions capability ===
New efforts to increase enforcement resources had yet to kick in and the mechanisms to support the casework in difficult removal cases was still being re-established. Despite this there were signs of progress. An additional London office had been established in Croydon and removals of immigration offenders showed a marginal increase. An ambitious plan unfolded following the commitments made as part of the 1999 legislation. In 2000 a pilot in London established the Immigration Service's first arrest team which was set up trained and equipped to operate independently of the police. By the end of the pilot three London Arrest Teams had been established and had conducted 413 operations.

In a 2001 report the Home Affairs Select Committee welcomed a commitment to increase enforcement staff but was sceptical regarding the ambitious target for enforced removals. The numbers of enforcement staff had risen from 1,677 in 2002 to 2,463 in 2003. A reorganisation of enforcement resulted in the setting up of a number of "co-located" offices. These were enforcement units that drew in a support network of mainstream IND caseworkers whose role was to deal with "barrier" casework, i.e.: the vital casework to deal with late applications to stay in the UK, Judicial Reviews and appeals which were part and parcel of the legal hurdles placed by legal advisors seeking to block someones removal. The results of the co-locations were disappointing but the principle was one that stuck and evolved later in the development of regionalisation and the setting up of Local Immigration Teams.

==== Developing Enforcement Capabilities project ====
The "Developing Enforcement Capabilities" project grew in size, scope and importance between 2000–2004 and transformed the Immigration Service enforcement arm into a law enforcement agency. The establishment of the arrest teams went hand in hand with a new system of tasking based on a National Intelligence Model to make best use of information and ensure that the work was better tied to national targets. By 2003 there were forty new Intelligence Units in operation and the level and standard of training for operational staff had been greatly enhanced.

Over and above the formation of the arrest teams whose remit was the detection of immigration offenders, was the establishment, in January 2002, of an Immigration Crime Team to tackle organised immigration related crime such as identity fraud, forgery and trafficking. Early successes included the arrest of 29 persons connected with British passport fraud and the arrest of two men for the manufacture and supply of forged British passports one of whom received a five-year sentence and the other 18 months. The operation resulted in one of the largest ever seizures of high quality forged passports believed to have a street value of over £2 million.

The ICT operated as part of Reflex, the Government's inter-agency task force created to combat organised immigration crime. Immigration enforcement also contributed to a joint intelligence unit under Operation Maxim involving the Immigration Service and UK Passport Service (UKPS) with a remit to investigate identity fraud alongside related criminality. In 2001 the numbers of fraudulent British passport applications detected was 161. In 2002 it was 1360. The ICT also contributed to Operation Wisdom, targeting individuals who obtained passports using the identities of dead children which was co-ordinated by the National Crime Squad and involved 18 UK police forces and the Immigration Service. In 2003-04 ICT made 115 arrests related to organised crime.

==== Cockle-pickers tragedy - gangmaster licensing ====
In February 2004, at least 23 Chinese nationals drowned at Morecambe Bay, Lancashire after being caught by rising tides while harvesting cockles. The incident was the result of multiple factors; the people had been trafficked by "Snakeheads" and then used for illegal labour by a gangmaster who had no regard for their safety and was subsequently jailed.

The subsequent investigation and inquiry revealed confusion over whether the Immigration Service had been aware of the illegal workers and could have prevented their exploitation and deaths. This highlighted deficiencies in management information systems for recording operational activities. The operational side of IND had been largely excluded from IT development following the failure of the Casework Programme. As a result of the disaster, a review of systems and processes was conducted, leading to the introduction of a new National Operations Database (NOD) in April 2005. Developed by enforcement staff, NOD aimed to improve the management and recording of operational activity.

The Morecambe Bay disaster highlighted facts that were already well known, that large numbers of illegal workers were being exploited, and was a key factor in the passage of the Gangmasters (Licensing) Act 2004 and the creation of the Gangmasters Licensing Authority.

==== Growth in marriage abuse ====
The Immigration and Asylum Act 1999 required registrars of civil marriages to report suspected sham marriages to the Home Secretary. Unfortunately it did not contain any power to carry out investigations into the genuineness of an intended marriage or to delay or refuse to conduct the marriage. By the early 2000s the numbers of suspect marriages being reported by registrars rose alarmingly. In response to registrars' concerns and media coverage of the issue, the Government established a "Bogus Marriage Task Force" in 2004 which included representatives from the Immigration Service, local government, the registration service and IND policy officials. This proposed a new scheme to govern marriages where one or both parties were subject to immigration control and did not have entry clearance as a spouse or fiancé(e). The scheme was enacted in section 19 of the Asylum and Immigration (Treatment of Claimants, etc.) Act 2004 and came into force on 1 February 2005. An exemption for Church of England marriages was to be part of the legislation's downfall but, when the new provisions came into force, the London Borough of Brent experienced a drop of 50% in the overall number of marriages taking place. The numbers of reports from all registrars of suspicious marriages dropped from 3,740 in 2004 to fewer than 200 between February 2005 and March 2006.

In 2003/04, in the London area alone, there were 114 people arrested in connection with taking part in or arranging sham marriages. These operations were led, and co-ordinated by Officers from the London Command Crime Group who were solely responsible for the disruption of illegal marriages in the London and South East area. Of these 43 people were charged and given custodial sentences of up to 18 months. The offences ranged from: Conspiracy to commit perjury; Facilitation offences under the Immigration Act 1971; Bigamy offences under the Offences against the Person Act 1861 and Forgery and Counterfeiting offences. During 2004–05, 100 people were arrested of whom 59 were charged and received sentences from three months to nine years.

The new laws was challenged by The Joint Council for the Welfare of Immigrants,(JCWI), who argued that the new requirements were in breach of the right to marry contained in Article 12 of European Convention of Human Rights; a "disproportionate and ineffective response to the alleged problem of 'sham' marriages"; and potentially discriminatory on faith grounds. The Courts agreed and the law was repealed.

=== 2005–2007 ===
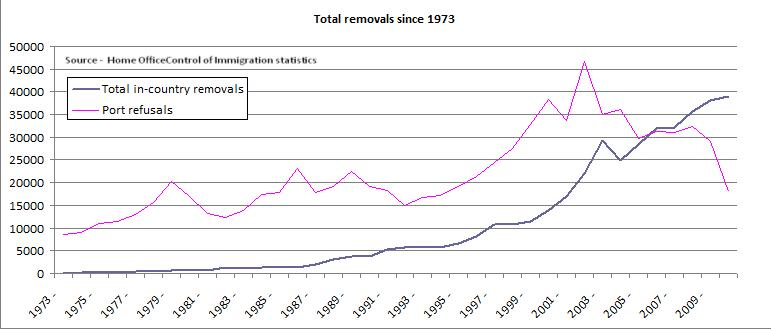
Total immigration removals 1973 - 2010. In 2006 in-country enforced removals overtook refusals at the border for the first time.

==== Focus on illegal workers and employers ====
The growth in enforcement resources, the increase in removals and the focus on illegal workers are all illustrated by the rise in illegal working operations between 2004 and 2006. In 2004 there were 1,600 enforcement operations against illegal workers, a 360% increase on the previous year, which detected 3,330 people working illegally. In a parliamentary reply in 2009 the Home Secretary reported that, in 2005/06, there had been 2915 operations targeting illegal workers which resulted in 3819 arrests. By 2007/08 this had risen to 7178 operations and 5589 arrests.

The failure of the 1999 Act to impose fines on employers for using illegal workers was now addressed by the Immigration, Asylum and Nationality Act 2006 which created a new Civil penalty for employers who hired illegal workers,(Section 15), and separate criminal offence of knowingly employing an illegal worker, (Section 21). The rules imposed much stricter rules than the 1999 legislation as to the level of evidence that employers needed to keep regarding proof of employment rights and carried a potential £10,000 fine for each illegal employee. The Act came into force on 29 February 2008.

=== Foreign national prisoners crisis ===
==== Background and context ====
In April 1996, the total percentage of prisoners who were foreign nationals had reached 7.8%. By 1999 it was 8.1%, 2002, 10% and in 2003, 12%. These percentages have to be seen in the context of a rising prison population.

By 2006, the foreign prisoner population had peaked at 14% and, at the time of writing in 2011, the figure has dropped slightly to 12.8%.

The criminal deportation process is different from that action taken against illegal entrants and is based on some of the oldest immigration legislation. It is a process for dealing with those who have broken the criminal law and, before Court Recommended deportation was discontinued, could be thought of as falling into two main areas:

- Deportation recommended by a court as part of a person's sentence,
- Deportation decided on by the Secretary of State on the basis that the person's presence was "not conducive to the public good".

Court recommendations for deportation meant that the person had a right of appeal against this part of the sentence that might have to be disposed of before any further action could be taken. If the court did not recommend deportation it was still possible for deportation to be taken on "conducive" grounds, (see above). Whatever route was chosen full consideration had to be given of the person's other circumstances - such as family ties and length of residence.

Tracking the prisoner through the criminal justice system was a difficult task. A well established system was dismantled in 1999 during the failed IT project noted earlier. This instability coincided not only with a steep rise in the numbers of foreign prisoners as described above, but also with the growth of asylum applications. All available IND resources were diverted to deal with the asylum backlog and the Criminal Casework Team that was gradually re-formed after the Casework Programme crisis, was left under staffed.

An additional factor, which proved fatal, was the lack of centrally available data on either the numbers of prisoners or the stage their case had reached. The development of IT systems within IND focussed almost entirely on asylum. The Case Information Database, (CID), which was hurriedly rolled out in the wake of the Casework Programme failure did not cater properly for either deportation or other casework relating to immigration offenders and prosecutions. Within a very short time of its development the organisation was dependent on CID for its management information but, because of its limitations, IND's senior managers were left unsighted to the full implications of the rise in the numbers of foreign criminals.

==== Impact and aftermath ====
On 14 July 2005, the National Audit Office published a report concerning the removal of asylum seekers. It reported that:

"The Criminal Casework Team did not have figures available on how many failed applicants had been released from prison because removal could not be arranged".

This triggered a chain of events which involved the Public Accounts Committee asking for further clarification. IND had difficulty answering the questions relating to the numbers involved and had to revise the figure upwards on more than one occasion, which undermined its credibility. It emerged, by April 2006, that 1023 foreign prisoners had been released at the end of their sentence between 1999 and 2006 without deportation consideration having been completed.

By May, it was confirmed that 880 of the cases had been considered for deportation but it was too little too late and the Home Secretary Charles Clarke resigned. On 23 May 2006 the new Home Secretary John Reid stated to the Home Affairs Committee:

"I believe that… in the wake of the problems of mass migration that we have been facing our system is not fit for purpose. It is inadequate in terms of its scope; it is inadequate in terms of its information technology, leadership, management, systems and processes; and we have tried to cope with this new age, if you like, with a system that has been inherited from an age that came before it".

In the aftermath of the scandal the trigger point at which foreign nationals would be considered for deportation was reduced from two years imprisonment to twelve months and plans were put in place to introduce "automatic deportation". Following an investigation into the background to the problem the Enforcement & Removals Directorate was broken up for the second time in seven years and its resources distributed among a network of new regional Local Immigration Teams. Its central management support functions were disbanded.

== Offences and types of enforcement action ==
Most people removed or deported from within the UK are not convicted criminals but immigration offenders; those who have for instance overstayed their visa or have been found to have entered the country illegally. These are not usually deported but made subject to administrative removal under powers found within Section 10 of the Immigration and Asylum Act 1999 and Schedule 2 of the Immigration Act 1971. Where a person is removed from the UK, they can still make an application to return to the UK, but under new immigration rules introduced in October 2008, a person who has been removed from the UK may not apply for a visa for a period of 1, 5 or 10 years, depending on whether they voluntarily left or were removed.

=== Deportation ===
Deportation is the lawful expulsion of an undesirable alien, usually following a criminal conviction but also in cases where there are grounds "conducive to the public good". Section 5 of the Immigration Act 1971—provides the power for the Home Secretary to make or revoke a deportation order (DO). This requires a person to leave the UK and prohibits them from re-entering the UK unless it is revoked. Any leave to enter or remain which a person gains is invalid whilst a DO is outstanding against them. There is no expiry date to a DO. A person who enters the UK in breach of a DO is an illegal entrant (see below) and may be removed as such. Deportation Orders were once always signed by the Home Secretary but are now more commonly signed by a senior official. They place a bar on return to the UK for lengths of time which vary according to the severity of the offence. Deportation Orders stay in force until revoked.

Section 32 of the UK Borders Act 2007 places a duty on the Secretary of State to make a deportation order in respect of a person who is not a British citizen who has been convicted in the UK of an offence and sentenced to either:

- a period of imprisonment of at least 12 months; or
- a period of imprisonment of any duration for a particularly serious offence.

This duty applies to all foreign criminals except where they fall within one of the exceptions in section 33. Where an exception does apply, deportation may still be pursued.

Section 33 of the Act details those who are exempt from the provisions of automatic deportation. There are certain exemptions:

- where an individual raises a claim for Asylum and Human Rights.
- where the foreign criminal was under the age of 18 on the date of conviction the individual will be exempt from automatic deportation.
- where the foreign criminal is an EEA citizen or immediate family member of an EEA citizen.
- subject to extradition, Mental Health Provisions or a recognised victim of trafficking.

=== Illegal entry ===
Illegal entrants fall into a number of types:

- Clandestine - those who have entered the country by evading the controls, e.g.: hidden in a vehicle, and there is no evidence of lawful entry. This category will be unable to provide any evidence of their entry to the United Kingdom. However, absence of a passport is not in itself sufficient grounds for dealing with a person as an illegal entrant. Full checks must be made to establish the person's identity and method of entry as far as possible.
- Deception - those who have entered by verbal or documentary deception, e.g.: by falsifying their account when applying for a visa or for leave to enter. It is an offence under section 24A of the Immigration Act 1971 to obtain or seek to obtain leave to enter or remain by deception. This can be either verbal or documentary deception. A person can be an illegal entrant if a third party has secured their entry by deception, even if they were unaware of it. If a person seeks entry to the UK as a visitor when their true intention is to claim asylum, then they are an illegal entrant as, had the immigration officer known the facts, he would not have granted leave as a visitor.
- Seamen deserters - Crew members, both sea-crews and air-crews are subject to different immigration rules and procedures to normal arrivals. When ships dock in the United Kingdom, it may be that crewmembers "jump" ship, without permission. Seaman deserters may not have a passport but rather hold a Seaman's Book, a national identity document issued to professional seamen that contains a record of their rank and service career.

Those absconding from port arrival areas are also technically illegally entrants but, when detected, may be dealt with under port arrival procedures for administrative convenience. Those returning to the UK in breach of an existing deportation order are also treated as illegal entrants.

The powers to remove illegal entrants are found in paragraphs 9 or 10 of schedule 2 to the Immigration Act 1971. These enable an Immigration Officer to give any directions for removal as are authorised in paragraph 8 of schedule 2 to the 1971 Act.

A series of court judgements in the late 1970s and early 1980s clarified some aspects of the law regarding illegal entry. The definition of what constituted illegal entry was gradually extended to include entry by deception. These included the Zamir judgement, which concerned a person who obtained a visa to join his father as his dependant while omitting to mention that he was married. The judgement held that people applying to come to the UK had a "duty of candour" to reveal any factors relevant to their stay. The House of Lords later changed its mind and it was not until 1983, with the Khawaja judgement, that a settled definition of illegal entry by deception came about.

The case of Norman (Court of Appeal 1985) established that a person who sought entry as a visitor when his true intention was to claim asylum was an illegal entrant. Had the Immigration Officer known on arrival that asylum was intended, then he would not have granted entry as a visitor.

=== Overstaying ===
Overstayers are those who stay beyond the time limit imposed on them when they enter the country. Those detected are removed under administrative powers found in Section 10 of the 1999 Immigration and Asylum Act.

Overstayers were, until the end of the 1990s, treated as potential deportees – a cumbersome administrative process which involved a written submission to the Home Secretary in each case. Until the mid-1980s there were attempts to prosecute overstayers but this was seen to be both expensive in terms of court time and of little deterrence value as well as further delaying the persons departure. A further difficulty was the interpretation of the law by the courts which held that an overstayer had to be detected within three years and proof had to be offered that the person knew that they had overstayed. This was later overturned by the 1988 Act.

The process by which overstayers were detected before 1998 was ostensibly based on the system of landing and embarkation cards. Landing cards were, and are, completed by arriving foreign nationals, (not EU nationals). A small percentage of arriving passengers had their arrival conditions recorded for later embarkation checks. These were placed on conditional "coded" landing by the immigration officer on arrival and would be required to fill out an embarkation card on departure. These cards were tallied by a small army of junior clerical staff in the Croydon HQ and those who had no "pair" could be assumed not to have left. In practice, the value of the cards as a clear indicator that a person had overstayed was limited and its value as a trigger for pro-active investigations was questionable. Embarkation controls were ended in 1998 at a time when savings had to be found. The landing card did though often contain a useful written record of the person intentions on arrival and evidence of their inbound carrier who would be liable to pay for their return trip. Overstayers were most likely to emerge in the course of other enquiries or as part of a police investigation. Assisting police to establish nationality of arrestees was, and is, a major part of immigration enforcement work.

=== Marriage abuse ===
The investigation of bogus marriages was, especially during the 1980s and 1990s, a bread-and-butter activity for Immigration Service enforcement. There were occasional operations to stop marriages at Registry Offices where firm intelligence suggested a fraud but the majority of this work was conducted at residential addresses at the behest of IND caseworkers who referred applications for further checks. Immigration Officers would visit the marital address and assess whether there was evidence that the marriage was genuine and subsisting and not a "marriage of convenience". Officers would assess the domestic setting and draw obvious conclusions where there was only evidence of one person living there. That might conclude matters but, in cases of doubt, the couple would be interviewed in detail and asked questions regarding their domestic life together and the history of their relationship. Some marriage visits did not fall into this category and were altogether sadder. It was common for immigration offices to receive letters, particularly from young Anglo-Asian women, asking for help to prevent a forced marriage. The ability of immigration officers to provide help in these scenarios was fatally limited by the fear the women had of the consequences of presenting evidence in a public immigration appeals hearing. Some protection was eventually provided by the Forced Marriage (Civil Protection) Act 2007.

The information available to the Immigration Service regarding bogus marriages was hindered by the proper concerns that registrars had of breaching confidentiality. The 1999 Asylum and Immigration Act introduced new powers for registrars’ to demand that both partners attend in person to give notice, provide proof of identity and a declaration of nationality. Under the terms of the Act registrars had a duty to report to the Home Office any marriage that they have reasonable grounds for suspecting to be a sham marriage.

Although the Act required registrars of civil marriages to report suspected sham marriages to the Home Office it did not contain any power to carry out investigations into the genuineness of an intended marriage or to delay or refuse to conduct the marriage. Marriage enquiries continued to be part of the general remit of operational enforcement but the numbers of enquiries possible became less as the focus was put on tracing failed asylum seekers and illegal workers. It remained a background issues rather than a primary concern with relatively little information gathered regarding success and failure. At one point a Home Office minister even denied that it was his responsibility.

Section 24(5) of the Immigration and Asylum Act 1999 provides the following definition: "Sham marriage" means a marriage (whether or not void) –

- (a) entered into between a person ("A") who is neither a British national nor a national of an EEA State other than the United Kingdom and another person (whether or not such a person or such a national): and
- (b) entered into by A for the purpose of avoiding the effect of one or more provisions of United Kingdom immigration law or the immigration rules.

==== Enforcement working practice ====
Working practice for enforcement immigration officers is based on the fact they are seeking to arrest or detain people who are already in the UK and have committed indictable offences. People arrested under immigration law are treated in the same way as those arrested by police for other offences. They are subject to the provisions of the Police and Criminal Evidence Act 1984 and, when arrested, are usually interviewed under caution in a police station and may have access to legal representation. The major exception to the foregoing is in the case of known immigration offenders, e.g.: absconders, who may simply be re-detained under powers contained in Schedule 2 to the Immigration Act 1971. Although immigration offenders may, in theory, be prosecuted for illegal entry or overstaying it is usual practice to seek to remove the person from the UK as quickly as possible.

Immigration enforcement has, during the 2000s and after, undergone a long process of reform where immigration staff have been trained and equipped to perform their own arrests rather than rely on police support. Not all enforcement work is based on visiting addresses to arrest or detain suspects; much effort is dedicated to attending police stations and interviewing suspected offenders who have been arrested by police.

Where private addresses are visited in an effort to trace offenders officers generally seek to gain the cooperation of those present but do have certain powers of entry and may obtain warrants to search premises. Enforcement visits are intelligence led and must, in accordance with agreements with police, be risk assessed.

The aim of the investigation is to prove the offence of illegal entry or overstaying and the aim of most searches is to seek evidence of the person's identity and immigration status to establish when, where and how they entered the UK. Where interviews at ports of entry are based on the idea of establishing a person's credibility on a balance of probabilities, the aim of the enforcement immigration officer is to prove an offence has been committed at a certain point in time, at a certain place and to a high degree of probability. Having successfully completed an investigation the officer will refer the case to a Chief Immigration Officer or above who will take note of any compassionate circumstances and, if authorised, serve formal notice on the person that they are an offender and are liable to be detained. Where there are no barriers to removal, e.g., outstanding criminal matters or other legal barriers, the person is taken to an immigration removal centre and arrangements made for their departure. In practice there are a multitude of potential obstacles to removing a person from the UK which may include outstanding applications or appeals, legal representations and lack of essential documentation.

== See also ==
- History of UK immigration control
- United Kingdom immigration law
- Immigration detention in the United Kingdom
- Modern immigration to the United Kingdom
- List of countries that regulate the immigration of felons
