= N v United Kingdom =

Legal case

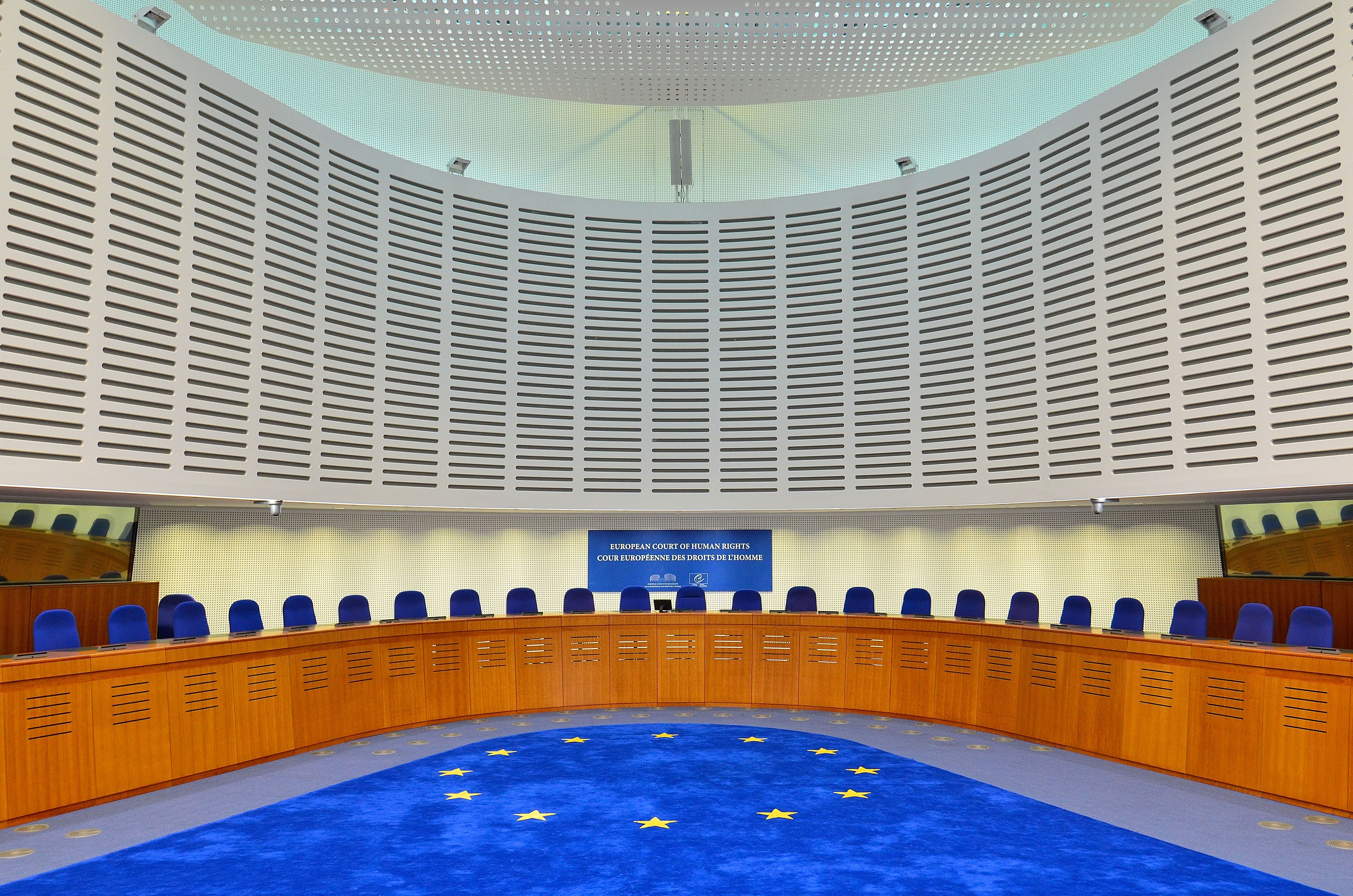
- Court: European Court of Human Rights
- Citation: [2008] ECHR 453

Keywords
- Health, deportation, exceptional circumstances

N v United Kingdom [2008] ECHR 453 is an ECHR human rights case, concerning the lawfulness of deporting an individual in the UK with serious health issues.

== Facts ==
A Ugandan citizen with HIV/AIDS claimed deportation to Uganda would be inhuman and degrading under ECHR article 3, because she would be unlikely to get health treatment. Without treatment she would stay alive for 2 years, with treatment for decades, almost as normal.

The House of Lords [2005] UKHL 31 agreed her case was not sufficiently exceptional, to justify halting deportation.

== Judgment ==
The European Court of Human Rights agreed with the House of Lords that the case was not exceptional, in contrast to the case of D v United Kingdom (1997) 24 EHRR 423.

... Article 3 does not place an obligation on the Contracting States to alleviate such disparities through provision of free and unlimited health care to all aliens without a right to stay within its jurisdiction. A finding to the contrary would place too great a burden on the Contracting States.

== See also ==
- United Kingdom enterprise law
