= UK Immigration Service =

Former executive agency in the UK

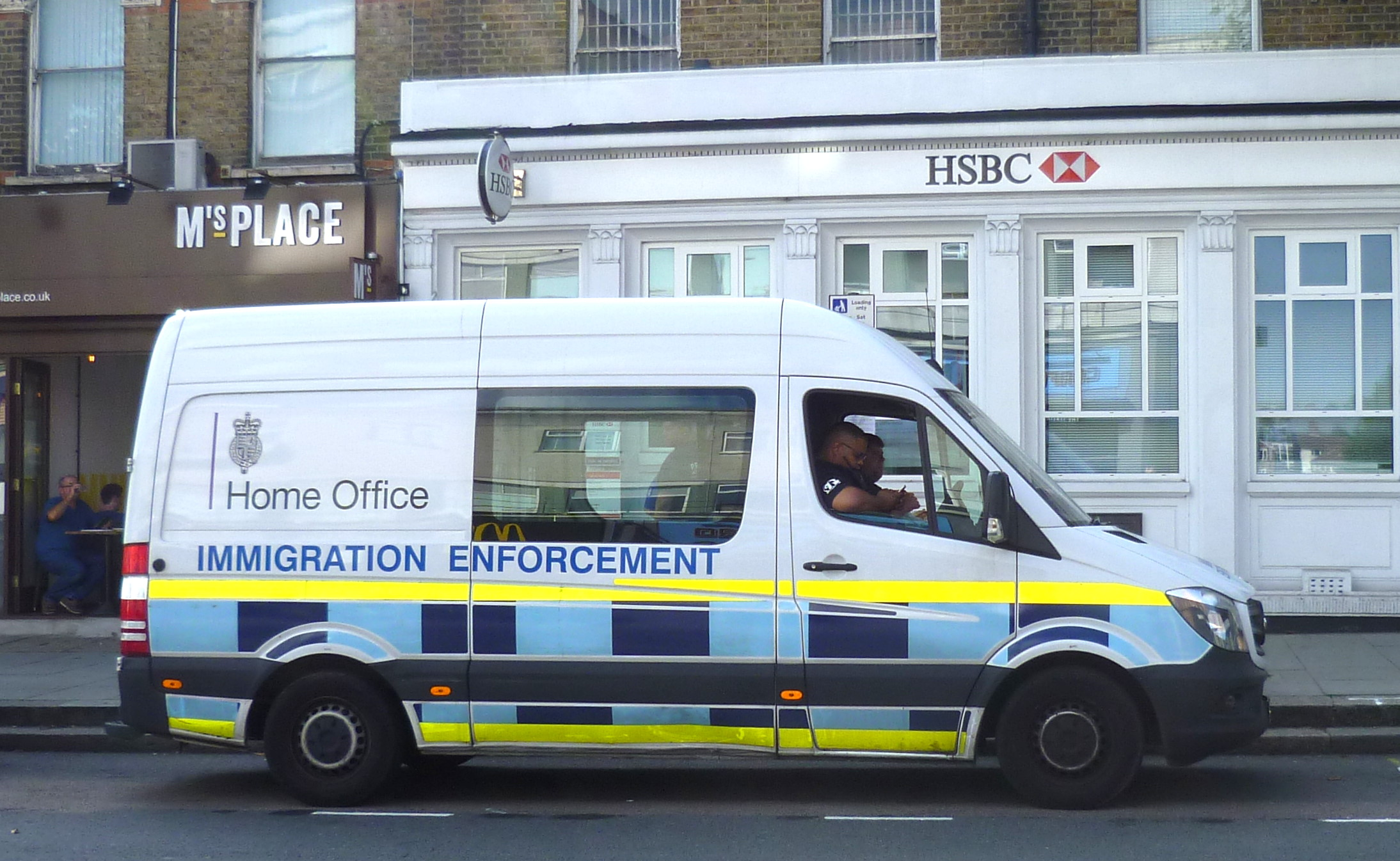
A Home Office Immigration Enforcement vehicle in north London.

The United Kingdom Immigration Service (previously known from 1920 to 1933 as the Aliens Branch and from 1933 to 1973 as the Immigration Branch) was the operational arm of the Immigration and Nationality Directorate, part of the Home Office. It was responsible for the day-to-day operation of front line UK Border Controls at 57 designated ports under the Immigration Act 1971, including airports, seaports, the UK land-border with Ireland and the Channel Tunnel juxtaposed controls. Its in-country enforcement arm was responsible for the detection and removal of immigration offenders such as illegal entrants, illegal workers and overstayers as well as prosecutions for associated offences.

On its disbandment in 2007, Immigration Service staff were re-deployed within the short-lived Border and Immigration Agency, which was then replaced in 2008 by the UK Border Agency, which in turn was replaced in 2012 by three separate entities: UK Visas and Immigration, Border Force and Immigration Enforcement, overseen by the Home Office.

== Legislation ==
The Act of Parliament which provided the basis for the Immigration Service was the Aliens Act 1905, followed by the Aliens Restriction Acts of 1914 and 1919. The powers exercised by Immigration Service officers were largely based on the Immigration Act 1971 that came into force on 1 January 1973 and its associated rules.

Other subsequent legislation includes:

- The British Nationality Act 1981, which came into force on 1 January 1983
- The Immigration Act 1988
- The Asylum and Immigration Appeals Act 1993
- The Asylum and Immigration Act 1996,
- The Immigration and Asylum Act 1999
- The Immigration (Leave to enter and remain) Order 2000
- The Nationality, Immigration and Asylum Act 2002
- The Asylum and Immigration (Treatment of Claimants, etc.) Act 2004
- The Immigration, Asylum and Nationality Act 2006
- The UK Borders Act 2007

== History ==
In its early history, the Immigration Service's work was dominated by control of passengers at seaports and control of seaman crews. By the 1920s, it was divided into districts under the charge of an Inspector. Even after the creation of the Irish Free State in 1922, UK immigration officers controlled Irish ports until 1925, while the new administration made its own arrangements.

By the late 1950s, the numbers of arriving passengers at airports overtook that of seaports for the first time, and the distribution of staff began to reflect this. There were little or no Immigration Service resources dedicated to dealing with in-country immigration offenders before 1973, and the detection of potential deportees was seen as a matter for the police, but starting in the 1980s the enforcement arm began to develop. Immigration control at airports gradually changed from the late 1990s onward as a new emphasis was given to controlling passengers in visa issuing posts abroad.

During the 2000s new technologies opened up opportunities to create a new flexible border control that aimed to better focus resources on high risk passengers. The Immigration Service underwent a transformation in terms of its remit, training and powers, such that by 2006 it removed more in-country offenders than were refused entry at UK ports for the first time. In 2007 the Immigration Service Ports Directorate became a uniformed service for the first time. The Immigration Service Enforcement Directorate was disbanded and its operational resources were divided among new regional "Local Immigration Teams". In April 2007 staff were informed that the UK Immigration Service would henceforth cease to exist as a distinct body, and would be replaced by the UK Border Agency.

== Organisational structure ==
UK Immigration Service grades were reflective of the legislation that stipulates that the decision to refuse a person leave to enter the United Kingdom is taken by an Immigration Officer only with the authority of a Chief Immigration Officer or an HM Immigration Inspector. The decision that a person inside the UK is in breach of immigration law and liable for administrative removal or deportation can be taken by an Immigration Officer or a caseworker of Executive Officer grade or above acting on behalf of the Secretary of State, with the authority of a Chief Immigration Officer or Higher Executive Officer. The removal of such offenders may only be enforced with the authority of an HM Inspector or Senior Executive Officer. Immigration Officers also have the power to deal with immigration offenders under the criminal proceedings part of the Immigration Act 1971 and prosecute through the Criminal Justice System.

The Immigration Officer grade was initially confined to men aged over 25. Those under 25 were automatically classified as Assistant Immigration Officers. Immigration Officers enjoyed an annual salary of between £200-300. Assistant Immigration Officers were common in the early days of the service but were dispensed with when the age bar on becoming an Immigration Officer was abolished, (date uncertain but probably before WW2). The grade of Assistant Immigration Officer was revived in 1991 but the role was initially badly defined and the scope of their work subject to ongoing dispute with the unions representing the Immigration Service grades, the Public and Commercial Services Union (PCS), and Immigration Service Union (ISU).

== Working practice ==
The working environment for the Immigration Service differed greatly dependent on whether the work was performed at a port of entry, or in an after-entry environment within the community. All staff were, and are, governed by the overarching laws found within the various Immigration and Nationality Acts but the everyday application of the law at ports of entry is made through the application of the Immigration Rules – these are published rules that explain how the law is to be interpreted and applied.

It is the interpretation of the rules that make immigration law so controversial. The practicalities of assessing large numbers of people arriving at ports mean that a great deal of discretion is given to the immigration officer, (although less now than was once the case).

While the officer must obtain the approval of a Chief Immigration Officer or Inspector to refuse someone entry, the way in which interviews are conducted and recorded are based on a lower level of proof than those in other areas of law enforcement. The immigration rules for visitors say that the immigration officer must be "satisfied" that the person is a genuine visitor not intending to stay longer than the rules allow and is not intending to seek employment. The idea that a relatively low ranking officer merely has to satisfy themself as to the person's intentions rather than prove an offence, as is the case in criminal matters, is a long-standing cause of legal and legislative tension. The level of proof is effectively a balance of probabilities rather than that of an overwhelming case being proven against the arriving passenger. In practice the immigration officer is required to conduct an in-depth interview, seek corroborative evidence from other sources and present a compelling case to a Chief Immigration Officer before refusing the person.

The work of a port based immigration officer is to sift arriving passengers to detect those whose accounts of their intentions give some cause for concern. The officer will briefly interview all arriving people who are not British Citizens or EU nationals, check their document for alterations or forgery, verify any entry clearances held, assess their travel history against the stamps in their passport, check them against warnings lists and do all of this, usually, in less than two minutes. If the officer is satisfied they will stamp the passport with one of a variety of wordings (conditions), depending on the reason for the persons stay and apply a time limit according to pre-set criteria.

The pressure on port immigration officers is to do this quickly so as to satisfy various targets concerning waiting times. There has never been a quota or target for detecting and refusing inadmissible passengers – the performance standards for immigration officers at ports have always revolved around the quality of interviewing, decision making and their investigative qualities.

== See also ==
- UK immigration enforcement
- History of UK immigration control
- Immigration to the United Kingdom since 1922
- Historical immigration to Great Britain before 1922
- History of British nationality law
- Asylum and Immigration Tribunal
