= Aliens Act 1905 =

Act of the Parliament of the United Kingdom

Aliens Act 1905 (Note: Section 10(1).)
- Act of Parliament
- Parliament of the United Kingdom
- Long title: An Act to amend the Law with regard to Aliens.
- Citation: 5 Edw. 7. c. 13
- Territorial extent: United Kingdom

Dates
- Royal assent: 11 August 1905
- Commencement: 11 August 1905 (Note: The Acts of Parliament (Commencement) Act 1793.)
- Repealed: 23 December 1919
Other legislation
Repeals/revokes	Registration of Aliens Act 1836
Repealed by	Aliens Restriction (Amendment) Act 1919

Status: Repealed

Text of statute as originally enacted

The Aliens Act 1905 (5 Edw. 7. c. 13) was an act of the Parliament of the United Kingdom. The act introduced immigration controls and registration for the first time, and gave the Home Secretary overall responsibility for matters concerning immigration and nationality. Those who "appeared unable to support themselves" or "likely to become a charge upon the rates" were declared "undesirable". The act also allowed to turn away potential immigrants on medical grounds. Asylum-seekers fleeing from religious or political persecution were supposedly exempted from the act but, nevertheless, their claims were often denied.

While the act was ostensibly designed to prevent entry of paupers or criminals and to set up a mechanism to deport those who slipped through, one of its main objectives was to control Jewish immigration from Eastern Europe. Jewish immigration from the Russian Empire significantly increased from 1881 which served as some basis for the creation of the Aliens Act 1905. Although it remained in force, the 1905 act was effectively subsumed by the Aliens Restriction Act 1914 (4 & 5 Geo. 5. c. 12), which introduced far more restrictive provisions. It was eventually repealed by the Aliens Restriction (Amendment) Act 1919 (9 & 10 Geo. 5. c. 92).

Some of the border control mechanisms established with the Aliens Act 1905 remained throughout the 20th century and into the 21st century.

== Demands for restriction ==
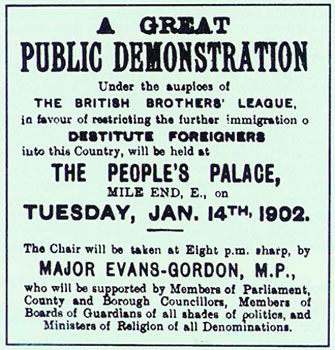
Anti-immigration poster from 1902, advertising a speech by William Evans-Gordon.

In the 19th century, the Russian Empire was home to about five million Jews, at the time, the "largest Jewish community in the world". They were obliged to live in the Pale of Settlement, on the territory of the former Polish State adjacent regions of Russia. In the aftermath of the assassination of czar Alexander II and subsequent pogroms, large scale emigration ensued, mostly for the United States, but many – about 150,000 – arrived in the United Kingdom, mostly in England. This reached its peak in the late 1890s, with "tens of thousands of Jews ... mostly poor, semi-skilled and unskilled" settling in the East End of London.

By the turn of the century, a media and public backlash had begun. The British Brothers' League was formed, with the support of prominent politicians such as William Evans-Gordon, MP for Stepney, organising marches and petitions. At rallies, its speakers said that Britain should not become "the dumping ground for the scum of Europe". In 1905, an editorial in the Manchester Evening Chronicle wrote "that the dirty, destitute, diseased, verminous and criminal foreigner who dumps himself on our soil and rates simultaneously, shall be forbidden to land". Antisemitism broke out into violence in South Wales in 1902 and 1903 where Jews were assaulted.

Aside from antisemitic sentiments, the act was also driven by the economic and social unrest in the East End of London where most immigrants settled. Work was difficult to come by and families required all members to contribute.

Future Prime Minister Winston Churchill opposed the bill. He stated that the bill would "appeal to insular prejudice against foreigners, to racial prejudice against Jews, and to labour prejudice against competition" and expressed himself in favour of "the old tolerant and generous practice of free entry and asylum to which this country has so long adhered and from which it has so greatly gained". On 31 May 1904, he crossed the floor, defecting from the Conservatives to sit as a member of the Liberal Party in the House of Commons.

== Subsequent developments ==
The whole act was repealed by section 16(2) of the Aliens Restriction (Amendment) Act 1919 (9 & 10 Geo. 5. c. 92).

== See also ==
- Edict of Expulsion
- United Kingdom immigration law
- UK Immigration Service
