= James Humphreys (pornographer) =

English pornographer (1930–2003)

Humphreys and his wife, Rusty, in May 1972

James William Humphreys (7 January 1930 – September 2003) was an English businessman and criminal who owned a chain of adult book shops and strip clubs in London in the 1960s and 1970s. He was able to run his business through the payment of large bribes to serving police officers, particularly those from the Obscene Publications Branch (OPB) of the Metropolitan Police. His diaries—which detailed meetings he had held with police officers, the venues of the meetings and the amounts of bribes paid—provided evidence for the investigation by anti-corruption officers of the Metropolitan Police.

Humphreys became involved in petty crime early in life, and was first arrested at the age of 15. The severity of his crimes increased over time and, in March 1958, he was sentenced to six years' imprisonment after using explosives to open a safe and steal £8,260 in money and postal orders. On his release he opened a strip club in Soho, the centre of London's sex industry. As Humphreys expanded his business and moved into other areas of the sex industry—sex shops and book shops selling obscene material—he had to bribe an increasing number of officers to be able to operate.

In January 1972 Humphreys and his wife, Rusty, took Ken Drury—the head of the Flying Squad—and his wife on holiday to Cyprus and Beirut. Journalists from The Sunday People found out about the trip, and published details on its front page, along with allegations about the bribery from Humphreys and other pornographers. Drury was suspended from duty, and soon afterwards the new Commissioner of the Metropolitan Police, Sir Robert Mark, began an anti-corruption purge in the force. Humphreys was arrested for assaulting his wife's former lover and sentenced to eight years' imprisonment. In an attempt to have his conviction overturned or the sentence reduced, he gave a copy of his diaries to the anti-corruption police and was interviewed about the payments to the OPB. Thirteen members of the OPB were imprisoned for corruption.

Humphreys was released from prison early after assisting the police. He left the UK and set up an illegal amphetamine factory in Ireland, fleeing the country shortly before the premises were raided by the Gardaí. He travelled to the US and invested in a drugs-smuggling operation, but was cheated of his investment. In the 1990s he and his wife were living in London and were arrested for running at least three brothels in Marylebone and Marble Arch. He was sentenced to twelve months in prison; his wife was gaoled for eight months. The character Benny Barrett, played by Malcolm McDowell in the 1996 BBC television series Our Friends in the North, was based on Humphreys.

== Biography ==
=== Early life; beginnings of criminal career ===
James William Humphreys was born in Bermondsey, South London, on 7 January 1930. He left school at age 14 and began a career of criminality; while still a teenager he became friends with Frankie Fraser, the London gangland enforcer. When he was 15 Humphreys was arrested for housebreaking and theft, and was fined £5. Seven months later he was sent to an approved school for stealing a car. (Note: An approved school was a reformatory school in which children who had committed crimes were one of the classes of inmates.) He was released the following year, but was sent back in October 1947 for a series of offences. In 1948 Humphreys was sentenced to three years in Rochester Borstal for theft; he was released in February 1950. Nine months later he was sent to prison for a year for aiding and abetting other criminals, and released in June 1951.

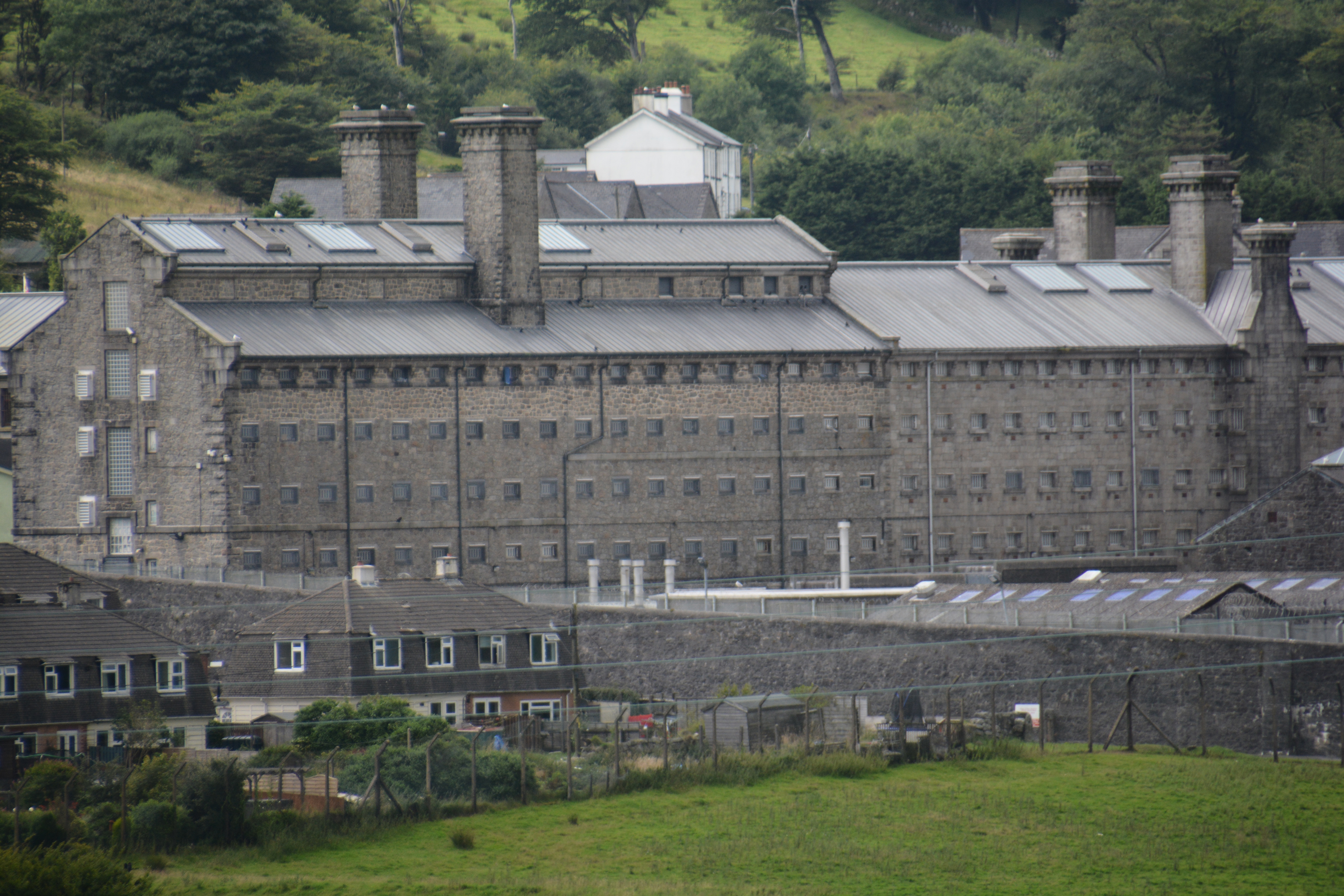
Dartmoor Prison, where Humphreys spent four and a half years (2017 photograph)

In July 1951 Humphreys married June Driscoll. His crimes became more serious and the sentences increased as he got older. In 1952 he was arrested for handling stolen goods and resisted—assaulting the police in the process. That October he was sentenced at the Old Bailey to 21 months in Wormwood Scrubs; he was released in December 1953. After being arrested for loitering with intent to steal cars, he was given a conditional discharge of a year in November 1954. He broke the discharge the following July when he was caught stealing clothes. He was sent to prison for two years and three months and was released in February 1957. Soon afterwards he broke into a sub-post office and blew open a safe to steal £8,260 of money and postal orders; (Note: £8,260 in 1957 equates to approximately £173,000 in 2025, according to calculations based on the Consumer Price Index (CPI) measure of inflation.) in March 1958 he was sentenced to six years' imprisonment. After serving four and a half years in Dartmoor Prison, he was released in October 1962.

=== Strip club and sex shop owner ===
On his release from Dartmoor Humphreys changed direction professionally and opened a strip club in Old Compton Street, Soho, which was frequented by fellow criminals. Soho was the area of London that, with a proliferation of sex shops and sex workers, was the centre of the city's sexual economy. Humphreys rekindled a relationship with a former girlfriend, June Packard, who had renamed herself Rusty Gaynor: Rusty after the colour of her hair, Gaynor after the actress Mitzi Gaynor. She had previously worked as a barmaid and model, but was employed as a stripper by the time she and Humphreys resumed their relationship. The couple married in May 1963.

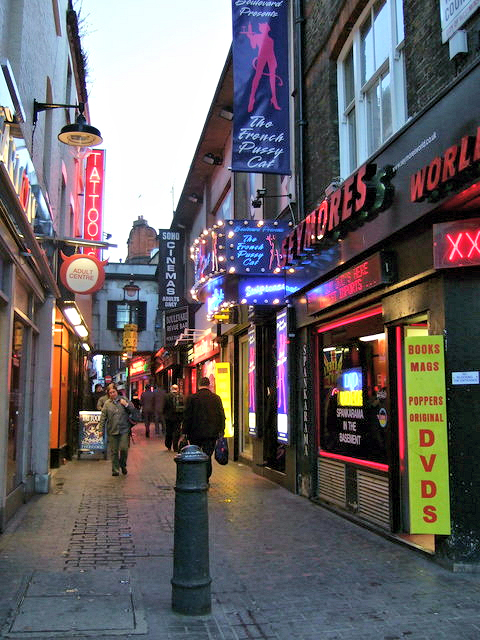
Walker's Court, Soho, in 2008

To keep the club free of harassment from the police, Humphreys had to pay protection money to Detective Sergeant Harold "Tanky" Challenor. When the demands for payments continued after Humphreys moved his club to nearby Macclesfield Street, he made a complaint to Scotland Yard; after a short investigation, Challenor was cleared. The club proved financially successful, so he and Rusty took a lease on 5 Walker's Court, Soho, and opened the Queen's Club, a strip bar opposite the Raymond Revuebar. For those who could not get into the Revuebar, Queen's was the alternative, and the club flourished. Rusty performed in three acts per day. The proceeds of the club enabled Humphreys to buy a 14-bedroom farmhouse in Newenden, Kent, a flat in Dean Street, near the club, a holiday apartment in Ibiza and a Rolls-Royce. The Queen's Club later moved to the junction of Berwick Street and D'Arblay Street, where it became more popular than in its previous location; Humphreys retained the property in Walker's Court as an office. (Note: One of the striptease artistes who worked at the D'Arblay Street premises was Norma Russell, later Norma Levy. In 1973 she was one of the two prostitutes photographed with Lord Lambton, the Parliamentary Under-Secretary of State for Defence (RAF), as they smoked marijuana in bed. He resigned from the government as a result.)

One of the other outlets on Walker's Court was an adult shop run by Bernie Silver, an established pornographer and racketeer. (Note: Silver owned several properties in the area and was known to the police as a flat farmer, an exploitative process of letting out flats to prostitutes for high rents.) In the early 1960s, while it was legal to sell softcore pornography, selling more explicit work was illegal. There was no licence needed from the police or local authority. Although there had only been five sex shops in Soho in 1955, that number grew markedly during the 1960s. The professor of law Colin Manchester considers the rise was because of the permissive society and the more lenient Obscene Publications Act 1959, which was less restrictive than its predecessor. Silver and Humphreys began a professional relationship; Silver thought Humphreys and his wife would be a profitable investment for the future, Humphreys thought Silver could provide access and protection. Both judgements proved sound. The journalist Neil Root writes that the two men "tolerated each other, perhaps became friendly for a time", but were wary of one another.

In 1964 one of Humphreys's clubs was a target for arson; after renovation Humphreys fitted it and all his commercial properties with steel shutters. It was suspected that the South London criminal organisation the Richardson Gang were behind the attack in an attempt to move their extortion business into Soho, but this was never proven. (Note: In 1966 and 1967 strip clubs owned by Silver and Frank Mifsud—a Maltese criminal active in the sex industry—were also targets for arson, as was a gambling club they jointly owned.) Humphreys appeared at Bow Street Magistrates' Court in July 1966, charged with allowing "unlicensed public music and dancing (striptease)" three times that year; he was fined £450. (Note: £450 in 1966 equates to approximately £7,000 in 2025, according to calculations based on the CPI measure of inflation.)

In 1969 Humphreys used his police contacts against Murray Goldstein, the owner of Maxim's strip club in Frith Street, in an attempt to seize control of the outlet. (Note: Goldstein stated that Humphreys alerted police to a possible cache of guns that had been found in Paris which could be connected to Goldstein. He was able to show police that he had not been in Paris during the period in question.) It was not the last time that Humphreys acted as a paid informant to the police; Root writes that "it can be said with certainty that Humphreys was a police informer, as has been the underworld view since the 1970s". That same year Humphreys and his wife tried to open a sex shop, but were told by police if they did so, they would face police interference and raids. Silver arranged for himself, Humphreys and Rusty to dine with Commander Wally Virgo, head of the Metropolitan Police's Serious Crime Squad. Humphreys was told that Detective Chief Superintendent Bill Moody, the head of the Metropolitan Police's Obscene Publications Branch (OPB), (Note: The Obscene Publications Branch was commonly known as the Obscene Publications Squad, and often colloquially called the "porn squad" or "dirty squad". The OPB were tasked with enforcing the Obscene Publications Act 1959 (as amended by the 1964 Act). The unit comprised 14 to 18 officers and covered all of London; Soho was the area on which they focused most.) had blocked the opening. Soon afterwards Silver invited Humphreys to a lunch with Moody at which Moody said that Humphreys could open the shop if he paid £4,000 up front, a half share of the takings and £100 a week to the OPB. Humphreys and Silver shared the remaining 50 per cent of the profits from the outlet. Virgo was given £1,000 for the initial introduction and subsequent payments of £2,000 a week and a £2,000 bonus at Christmas.

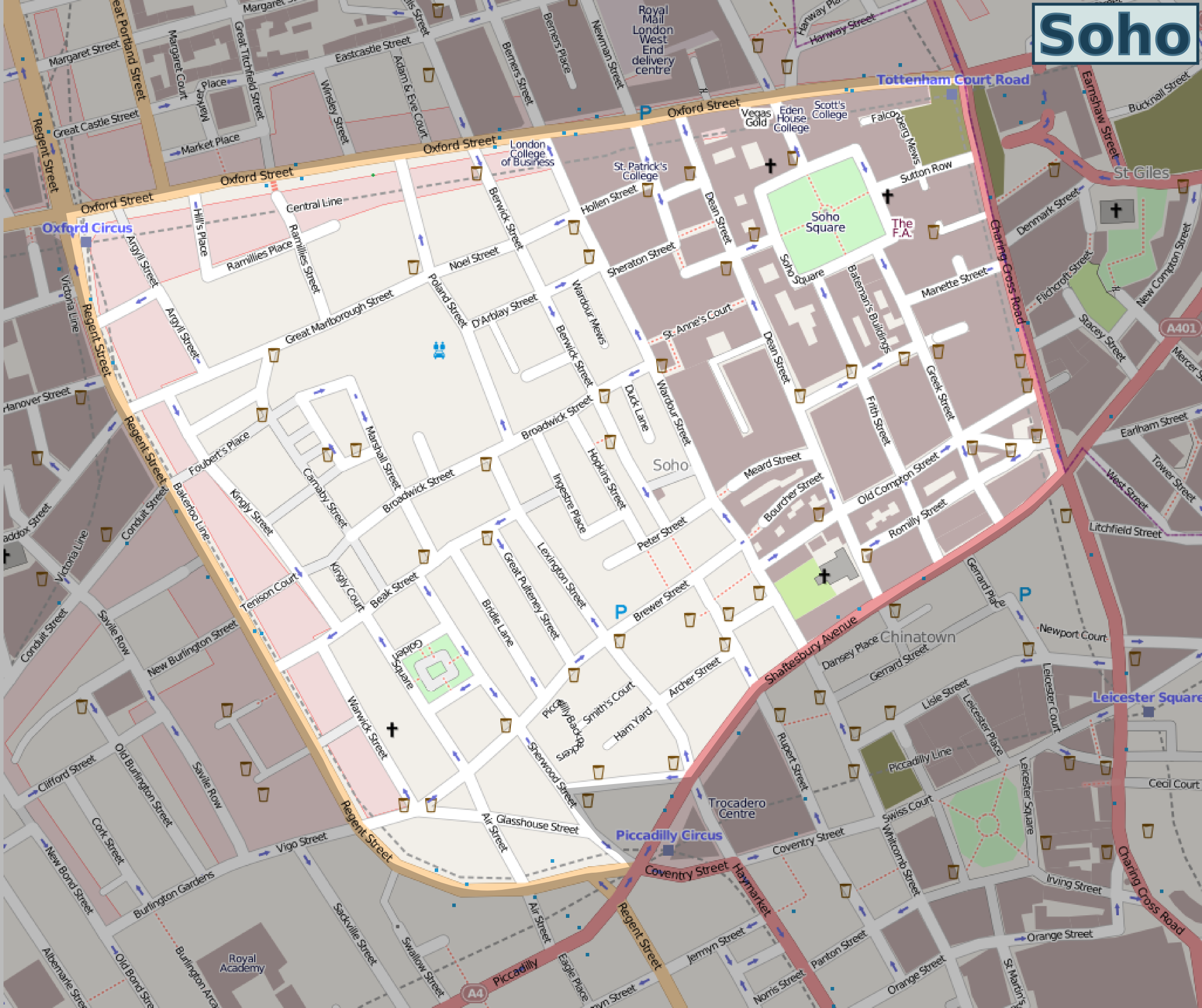
Soho: the area of London where Humphreys conducted most of his business

Over the next three years Humphreys opened between six and ten other sex shops. The first three—opened on Lisle Street, Windmill Street and Newport Street—cost Humphreys and Silver £6,000 in payments to Moody. (Note: £4,000 in 1969 equates to approximately £58,000, £100 the same year equates to approximately £1,000 in 2025 and £6,000 in 1970 equates to approximately £82,000, according to calculations based on the CPI measure of inflation.) (Note: Any sex shop opened in London by any pornographer had to pay an opening bribe of between £500 to several thousand and a weekly bribe to the OPB, depending on the takings of the outlet. Some outlets, like one sex shop on Wardour Street, cost £150 a day in bribes. The payments ensured that the shops could operate without undue interference and that no-one else was able to open other sex shops in the vicinity. The bribes were affordable because of the profit margins on pornography and the size of the market, which was estimated at £10 million a year in the UK in 1971. While the front room of the sex shops sold legal softcore pornography, the back room would sell the illegal hardcore version. While the softcore material sold with a high profit margin, this paled when compared with hardcore output. Explicit magazines sold in Denmark or Amsterdam for 50p to 60p each would retail for £5 in London; 200-foot (61 m) black and white films (known in the trade as rollers) were purchased in Denmark for £3 and sold for £15, while colour films cost £5 to £9 and retailed at £30. The 400-foot (120 m) colour rollers were sold for as much as a purchaser was willing to pay.) Between 1969 and 1972 Humphreys made £216,000 profit from his shops. (Note: £216,000 in 1972 equates to approximately £2,560,000 in 2025, according to calculations based on the CPI measure of inflation.)

Silver taught Humphreys about bribing police officers and gave him the advice "Get them when they're young", as they would then remain amenable when older. The police were paid on a sliding scale, depending on rank: £5 for a constable, £10 for a sergeant and up to £2,000 a month for the senior officers. (Note: £5 in 1970 equates to approximately £70 in 2025, £10 in 1970 equates to approximately £140 and £2,000 in 1970 equates to approximately £27,000 in the same year, according to calculations based on the CPI measure of inflation.) Humphreys would invite members of the OPB to dinner at some of London's top restaurants—Quo Vadis, SPQR, Le Caprice and the Savoy Hotel—where he would pay for the meal and give each of them a "goodwill payment"; when asked how he knew whether a policeman was amenable to taking bribes, he answered "I've never known one that isn't." This would include taking out entire police departments: on one occasion Silver, Humphreys and their wives entertained the Flying Squad, paying for the meal at which the senior magistrate in London was also a guest. Often Humphreys would entertain and bribe different policemen three times a day: lunch, dinner and nightclubs, and often the bribes were not money, but cars or jewellery for police officers' wives. The head of the Flying Squad, Ken Drury, dined with Humphreys so often, the officers under his command noticed how much weight he was putting on; Humphreys bought him an exercise bicycle and a rowing machine to help him keep his weight down.

The bribes paid to the OPB ensured that anyone trying to open a rival sex shop would be repeatedly raided until they gave up their business. When police had to raid the shops owned by Humphreys or Silver—or any of the other pornographers who bribed the police—the owners received a coded telephone message first, often WHSmith or Ryman, to signify that the sex shops had to be as legitimate as a high street newsagent and stationers. What the police officers did not know was that for each lunch, dinner or meeting he had with them, Humphreys kept a diary listing those present, the venue and the amount of bribe he paid; these were often for smaller amounts of £50–£100, and were in addition to the regular fees paid to keep the shops and clubs running.

=== Sunday People investigation ===
Front cover of The Sunday People, 27 February 1972

In January 1972 Drury, Humphreys and their wives travelled to Cyprus and Beirut for a fortnight's holiday. Drury signed into the hotel in Famagusta under his own name, with his police rank, and gave his address as Scotland Yard. News of the trip was soon leaked to journalists from The Sunday People. This was either by Joey Pyle, a gangland figure angry at having been charged with firearms offences, or a member of the Flying Squad who saw a postcard Drury had sent to his colleagues in London.

An investigation was soon undertaken by The Sunday People. A journalist flew to Cyprus and was given a copy of the hotel register; the newspaper hired a private investigator who visited the branch of Thomas Cook on Regent Street, where he obtained a duplicate of the receipt, which showed Humphreys had paid for the Drurys' holiday. In February 1972 The Sunday People published a front-page exposé titled "Police Chief and the 'Porn' King". They began their article "The head of Scotland Yard's world-famous Flying Squad has just been spending an expensive holiday abroad with one of Britain's most notorious pornographers". (Note: The future Commissioner of the Metropolitan Police Robert Mark thought the report "perhaps the most spectacularly worthwhile piece of journalism I can recall".) The report continued on the inside pages, including the statement:

Police officers in London. In particular some of those attached to Scotland Yard's Obscene Publications Department, are being systematically bribed by dealers in pornography. It is this that largely explains why their businesses flourish; why immense stocks of 'dirty' books, magazines and films are not confiscated.

Drury responded to the claims by giving an interview to the News of the World claiming he and Humphreys were searching for Ronnie Biggs, one of the gang members involved in the 1963 Great Train Robbery. He also stated that he was paying Humphreys as an informant. The accusation he was being paid as a "grass" angered Humphreys, and he gave a press conference to say that Drury was lying. On 2 March 1972 Drury was suspended from duty by Sir John Waldron, the Commissioner of the Metropolitan Police; Waldron also instituted an investigation into the allegations made by The Sunday People. Drury resigned from the force on 1 May 1972.

In April 1972 Robert Mark was appointed as Commissioner of the Metropolitan Police. He began a fundamental change of the force, targeting corrupt policemen; soon after his appointment he told detectives that they were "the most routinely corrupt organisation in London". (Note: According to the journalists Barry Cox, John Shirley and Martin Short, in their 1977 study The Fall of Scotland Yard, the exposé in The Sunday People was a key "element in a combination of forces that came together in the spring and summer of 1972 ... [that] turned into a collective onslaught on pornography, vice and police corruption". In addition to Mark's appointment, the Longford Report on pornography was published on 20 September 1972, following a sixteen-month committee of inquiry chaired by Lord Longford, a leading member of the anti-pornography organisation the Festival of Light. The historians Roger Davidson and Gayle Davis observe that in the early 1970s there was a backlash against the permissiveness of the 1960s that included organisations such as the Festival of Light, the National Viewers' and Listeners' Association and the Responsible Society.) Mark brought in Detective Chief Superintendent Bert Wickstead, the head of the Serious Crime Squad (SCS), to take action against the pornographers and remove the corrupt officers from the OPB. (Note: The SCS had been set up two years previously to investigate the Richardson and Kray gangs. Wickstead and the SCS were based in Limehouse, out of the influence of the OPB in Scotland Yard.) The SCS began a three-year investigation into the relationship between the OPB and the pornographers; Silver, Humphreys and Eric Mason—the owner of ten sex shops—were the police's key targets. (Note: Mason's full name was Ronald Mason, but he went by the name Eric.)

=== Attack on Peter Garfath ===
The relationship between Humphreys and his wife, Rusty, was sometimes turbulent. In September 1972 she received a three-month gaol sentence for possession of a firearm; there were some reports that she may have been threatening Humphreys with it. Humphreys said he would fly over central London and drop pornography if she was not released, but did not follow through. She was released in late October.

Shortly after Rusty's release, Humphreys arranged to have Peter Garfath—one of her former lovers—beaten up, after suspecting the two had rekindled their relationship. Garfath was attacked by four men at the Dauphine Club in Marylebone on 23 October and was slashed around the head, face and arms with a knife. Rusty denied that her husband was behind the action, and thought it was connected to the distribution of forged £50 notes that Garfath had been involved with. While corrupt officers were removed from Scotland Yard by Mark's actions, and the SCS were investigating the criminal activity in Soho, the large-scale pornographers left the country. Silver departed for Spain and Frank Mifsud—a Maltese criminal who ran a string of brothels—travelled to Ireland and then Brazil. Humphreys, who had been tipped off that the police had made the connection between himself and the Garfath attack, used a false passport in the name of Leigh and escaped to Rotterdam.

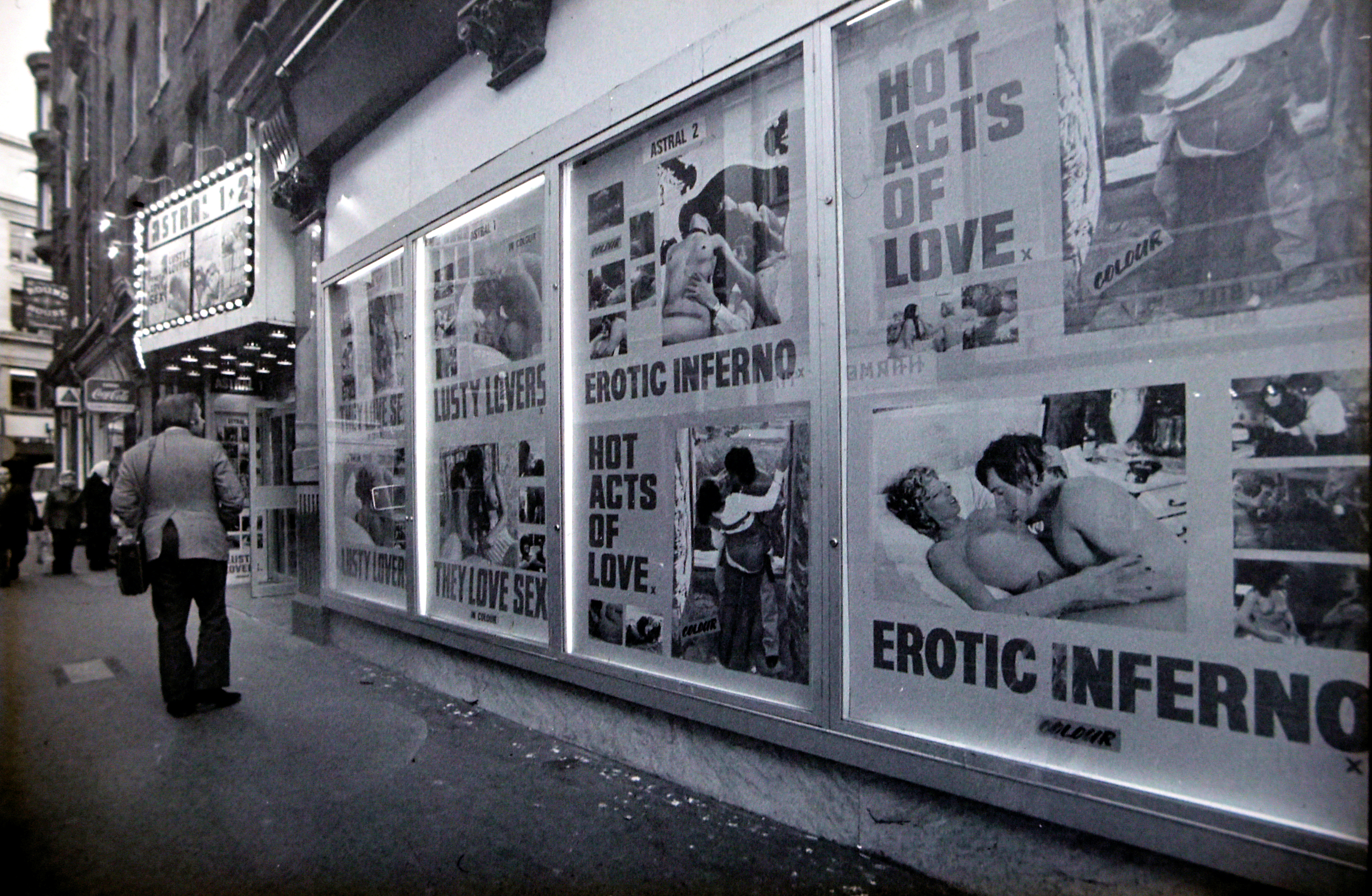
Soho in the 1970s: the Astral 1 and 2 cinema, Brewer Street

The SCS raided 50 premises connected to the pornography industry over the weekend of 27 and 28 January 1973, including sex shops, storage premises and residences. (Note: The SCS repeated the raids in early January 1974, including those of Humphreys; twenty people were arrested.) More than 40 long tons (41 t) of hardcore publications were seized and 11 people were arrested; one of them was Rusty Humphreys, at the couple's Brook Street residence. She was arrested because she and Humphreys rented a property in Greek Street to prostitutes. Each tenant bought a three-year lease for £2,000 plus £100 a week rent. Two years into the arrangement Humphreys bodily ejected two of the women from the flats. One negotiated a return, but three months later Rusty Humphreys violently threw her out again. Both women complained to members of Wickstead's SCS. When Rusty was arrested, police searched the Brook Street premises and found, in a wall safe, one of Humphreys's diaries containing the details of his bribes to police officers. (Note: In August 1973, while Humphreys was abroad, Rusty was charged with keeping a brothel in Soho. She was given a three-month suspended sentence.)

Four of the men arrested in the raids were charged with the attempted murder of Garfath, and Rusty Humphreys was charged with attempting to pervert the course of justice by offering Garfath £2,000 not to give evidence against Humphreys. That July, Rusty was cleared of the attempt to bribe Garfath; two of the men were found guilty of unlawfully wounding and sentenced to five years imprisonment; another had pleaded guilty to the same charge and was gaoled for one year. (Note: Garfath committed suicide in November 1975.)

Humphreys was arrested for the attempted murder of Garfath in June 1973 in Volendam, the Netherlands, by two members of the SCS and a member of the Amsterdam police. He was held in prison in Amsterdam while a request was made for extradition back to the UK. He was part of an escape attempt from the prison that November; four men managed to break out, but Humphreys was recaptured on the prison roof. In late December 1973 the Supreme Court of the Netherlands ordered his return to the UK, after Humphreys had appealed an earlier decision. On 9 January 1974 he arrived back in the UK, where he was charged with causing grievous bodily harm with intent. Humphreys stood trial for his involvement in the attack on Garfath in April 1974. In court he was described as "the emperor of porn". He was found guilty and sentenced to eight years in prison. In 1977 Humphreys claimed he had been framed by Detective Chief Inspector John Bland, conspiring with criminals, because of the suspension of Drury.

Humphreys and Rusty decided to co-operate fully with the police in an attempt to earn him an early release. Rusty handed a second of Humphreys's diaries over to Deputy Assistant Commissioner Gilbert Kelland, who was in charge of A10 (Complaints Investigation) Branch. (Note: A10 was the branch of the Metropolitan Police set up by Mark to investigate all complaints about the police, particularly allegations of criminal activity.) Humphreys was interviewed at length by A10, and surprised detectives by his detailed memory of events. His two diaries covered 1971 to 1972 and included details of more than 350 meetings with police officers and the amounts he paid them in bribes. He had also written a detailed letter to Deputy Commissioner James Starritt while he was in Amsterdam, and brought back a twelve-page statement he had worked on.

On 28 February 1976 twelve police officers were arrested in connection with the corruption investigation being run by Kelland. Eight of those arrested had retired from the force and four were under suspension. These included Drury, Virgo and Moody. The first of two trials of those charged with corruption took place in November that year and involved Detective Chief Inspector George Fenwick, Detective Inspectors Charles O'Hanlon and Cyril Jones, Detective Sergeant Peter Fisher, Detective Constable Michael Chamberlain and one other; all faced charges of "conspiring together and with others to accept money and other considerations from persons trading in pornography between July 1964 and October 1973". Humphreys refused to appear as a witness during the case because O'Hanlon was a good friend. All but one were found guilty. During sentencing, the judge, Justice William Mars-Jones, said "Thank goodness the Obscene Publications Squad has gone. I fear the damage you have done may be with us for a long time." Fenwick was sentenced to ten years in prison, Chamberlain was given eight years, Jones and O'Hanlon seven years and Fisher received four years.

The second trial of members of the OPB began in March 1977. Six former policemen were charged: Virgo, Moody, Detective Inspectors Leslie Alton and Rodney Tilley, Detective Sergeant David Hamer and Detective Constable Peter Brown. Humphreys was a key witness for the prosecution and was brought to the Old Bailey from prison each day. He said he had given Kelland the names of 42 policemen whom he had bribed. He told the court that in addition to his book shops in Soho, he dealt in pornography internationally—in the Netherlands, Denmark, Sweden and the US—and owned sex boutiques, strip clubs and his share of the brothel in Soho. Humphreys said that he was giving evidence because his own conviction was going to be reassessed; he stated that he was still innocent of the charges for which he was serving time. In mid-May, all six men were found guilty. Virgo and Moody were both given twelve-year sentences; Alton received ten years; Brown was given seven years; Hamer four years and Tilley three years. (Note: Virgo appealed and, in March 1978, the Court of Appeal overturned his conviction and set aside his sentence.)

In July 1977 the case against Drury, Detective Inspector Alistair Ingram and Inspector John Legge opened; all three were accused of "corruptly accepting cash and other favours" from Humphreys. He initially refused to appear in court for the prosecution, but was persuaded to change his mind by a journalist from The Sunday People who told him that his conviction for the attack on Garfath was being investigated. Drury and Ingram were found guilty; the judge instructed the jury to find Legge not guilty. Drury was sentenced to eight years; Ingram to four years' imprisonment. Their convictions meant twelve policemen had been sent to prison as a result of Humphreys's evidence.

Humphreys was released from prison on 24 August 1977, three years and four months into his eight-year sentence, after the royal prerogative was exercised. He wrote two novels while he was in prison: Through the Eyes of a Pig and Seven Rotten Apples.

=== Later life ===
Humphreys left the UK and set up a greyhound-breeding business in Knocklong, a small village in County Limerick. The business was a front for its real purpose of an illegal amphetamine factory. He fled the country in 1982, just before a raid by the Gardaí, and travelled to the US where he invested in a drugs-smuggling operation, but was cheated of his investment.

After living in Mexico and the US, Humphreys and his wife returned to the UK in 1988 and opened a restaurant in Blackheath, south east London. Following its liquidation, the couple set up at least three brothels in Marylebone and Marble Arch; police suspected the couple were operating a fourth brothel, but could not prove it. Although prostitution is legal in the UK, living off immoral earnings is an offence. (Note: Section 30 of the Sexual Offences Act 1956, which was in force when the Humphreys were running the brothels, states that it is an offence "knowingly to live wholly or in part on the earnings of prostitution".) After a surveillance operation, the couple were arrested in November 1993. The Humphreys, who were living in West Hampstead, pleaded guilty to the charges; Humphreys described himself as a greyhound bloodstock agent. As well as taking a percentage of the women's earnings, the couple charged the prostitutes £30 a day expenses and between £100 and £180 a day rent. Additional charges were also levied, including £100 a week for printing advertising cards, and £50 a day to the man who posted the cards in local phone boxes. The rent and additional charges were so high that the women worked twelve hours a day, seven days a week. The judge, Mr Justice Fingret, said that the brothels had been "a well organised and highly profitable organisation, netting the two of you well in excess of £100,000 profit in a 20-month period". The prosecution estimated the couple's takings to be £100,000–£300,000. Humphreys was sentenced to twelve months; Rusty was gaoled for eight months in Holloway Prison. Humphreys died in September 2003.

In the 1996 BBC television series Our Friends in the North the character Benny Barrett, played by Malcolm McDowell, was based on Humphreys. In 1999 Humphreys discussed the possibility of their life story being made into a film with Film4 Productions, who gave the film the provisional title Rusty; as at 2024 the film remains unmade.

== Notes and references ==
=== Sources ===
==== Books ====
- Ascoli, David (1979). The Queen's Peace: The Origins and Development of the Metropolitan Police, 1829–1979. London: Hamish Hamilton. ISBN 978-0-241-10296-1.
- Campbell, Duncan (2019). Underworld: The Definitive History of Britain's Organised Crime (Kindle ed.). London: Ebury Publishing. ISBN 978-1-4735-6609-5.
- Cox, Barry; Shirley, John; Short, Martin (1977). The Fall of Scotland Yard. London: Penguin. ISBN 978-0-1405-2318-8.
- Cox, Pamela (2016). Gender, Justice and Welfare in Britain, 1900-1950. Basingstoke, Hampshire: Macmillan. ISBN 978-1-4039-1984-7.
- Davidson, Roger; Davis, Gayle (2012). Sexual State. Edinburgh: Edinburgh University Press. ISBN 978-0-7486-4945-7.
- Edwards, Robert (1988). Goodbye Fleet Street. London: Jonathan Cape. ISBN 978-0-224-02457-0.
- Greenslade, Roy (2008). "Subterfuge, set-ups, stings and stunts: how red-tops go about their investigations". In de Burgh, Hugo (ed.). Investigative Journalism. Abingdon, Oxfordshire: Routledge. pp. 319–339. ISBN 978-1-134-06870-8.
- Kelland, Gilbert (1989). Crime in London. London: Grafton. ISBN 978-0-586-07300-1.
- Keren-Paz, Tsachi (2013). Sex Trafficking: A Private Law Response. Abingdon, Oxfordshire: Routledge. ISBN 978-1-135-05122-8.
- Manchester, Colin (1986). Sex Shops and the Law. Aldershot, Hampshire: Gower. ISBN 978-0-566-05232-3.
- Mark, Robert (1978). In the Office of Constable. London: Collins. ISBN 978-0-00-216032-2.
- Morton, James (2008). Gangland Soho. London: Hachette. ISBN 978-1-4055-1559-7.
- Punch, Maurice (2013). Police Corruption: Exploring Police Deviance and Crime. Abingdon, Oxfordshire: Routledge. ISBN 978-1-134-02814-6.
- Root, Neil (2019). Crossing the Line of Duty: How Corruption, Greed and Sleaze Brought Down the Flying Squad. Stroud, Gloucestershire: History Press. ISBN 978-0-7509-9098-1.
- Scambler, Graham; Scambler, Annette (1997). Rethinking Prostitution: Purchasing Sex in the 1990s. London: Psychology Press. ISBN 978-0-415-10207-0.
- Sutherland, John (1983). Offensive Literature: Decensorship in Britain, 1960-1982. London: Rowman & Littlefield. ISBN 978-0-389-20354-4.

==== Journals and magazines ====
- Carter, Oliver (26 July 2018). "Original Climax Films: historicizing the British hardcore pornography film business" (PDF). Porn Studies. 5 (4): 411–425. doi:10.1080/23268743.2018.1489301. S2CID 158221013.
- Coulmont, B.; Hubbard, P. (2010). "Consuming Sex: Socio-legal Shifts in the Space and Place of Sex Shops". Journal of Law and Society. 37 (1): 189–209. doi:10.1111/j.1467-6478.2010.00501.x. S2CID 55135275.
- Cockerell, Michael (6 February 1975). "How Good is Scotland Yard Now?". The Listener. Vol. 93, no. 2392. pp. 163–165.
- Garnett, Mark (2011). "Lambton, Antony Claud Frederick, styled Lord Lambton (1922–2006)". Oxford Dictionary of National Biography (online ed.). Oxford University Press. doi:10.1093/ref:odnb/97561. (Subscription, Wikipedia Library access or UK public library membership required.)

==== Newspapers ====
- "3 gaoled for club attack". The Guardian. 25 July 1973. p. 8.
- "12 Yard men on bribe charges". The Guardian. 29 February 1976. p. 1.
- Adamson, Colin (1 July 1994). "Ex-porn king jailed for new vice racket". The Evening Standard. p. 21.
- Borrell, Clive (9 November 1976). "Scotland Yard men on bribery plot charges". The Times. p. 4.
- Borrell, Clive (25 August 1977). "Man who helped to jail police is freed". The Times. p. 3.
- Campbell, Duncan (14 June 1994a). "Old school family keeps pace with changing vice game". The Guardian. p. 7.
- Campbell, Duncan (6 July 1994b). "Red Light, Blue Lamp". The Guardian. p. T2.
- Campbell, Duncan (16 January 1999). "She was Soho's top stripper in the Sixties. Now Rusty will expose its low life on film". The Guardian. p. 3.
- Cashinella, Brian (2 May 1972). "Resignation by head of Flying Squad". The Times. p. 1.
- Cashinella, Brian (16 June 1973). "Yard men arrest Soho strip club owner in Holland". The Times. p. 1.
- "Cdr Bert Wickstead". The Daily Telegraph. 24 March 2001.
- Chippindale, Peter (28 December 1973). "Strip-club owner to be extradited from Holland". The Guardian. p. 20.
- Chippindale, Peter; Leigh, David (25 August 1977). "Soho's 'porn king' freed". The Guardian. pp. 1, 22.
- "Ex-stripper gaoled on pistol charge". Birmingham Daily Post. 26 September 1972. p. 9.
- "Former club owner says Yard man framed him". The Times. 17 June 1977. p. 3.
- "Former porn king and wife jailed for running 'extortionate' call girl ring". The Herald. 2 July 1994. p. 5.
- Hartley, Alec (7 July 1977a). "Ex-Flying Squad chief guilty of corruption". The Guardian. p. 1.
- Hartley, Alec (8 July 1977b). "Why the porn king grassed on the Sweeney". The Guardian. p. 13.
- Hartley, Alec (8 July 1977c). "Judge attacks 'light sentences' as Drury gets eight years". The Guardian. p. 22.
- Harvey, Peter (2 May 1972). "Squad chief resigns". The Guardian. p. 24.
- Harvey, Peter (31 January 1973). "£170,000 bail for seven in porn conspiracy case". The Guardian. p. 8.
- Jordan, Philip (14 November 1975). "Death linked to Humphreys". The Guardian. p. 9.
- "Judge acquits detective in corruption case". The Guardian. 21 June 1977. p. 3.
- Leigh, David (22 June 1973). "Soho strip club owner 'was tipped off'". The Times. p. 3.
- Mackie, Lindsay (1 March 1977a). "Police 'took huge bribes'". The Guardian. pp. 1, 24.
- Mackie, Lindsay (12 May 1977b). "Scotland Yard chiefs guilty of taking bribes". The Guardian. pp. 1, 22.
- Mackie, Lindsay (14 May 1977c). "The squad which gave obscenity a meaning of own". The Guardian. p. 15.
- Manifold, Laurie (27 February 1972a). "Police Chief and the 'Porn' King". The Sunday People. p. 1.
- Manifold, Laurie (27 February 1972b). "Corruption: The Charges Against the Police". The Sunday People. p. 3.
- McHardy, Anne (23 December 1976). "Porn squad men pay for conspiracy". The Guardian. p. 1.
- Paddick, Brian (9 February 2010). "A bad day for race relations in the police". The Independent. p. 6.
- Palmer, Raymond (15 August 1971). "Filthy Rich". The Observer. p. 9.
- "Police question 20 after West End vice raids". The Times. 5 January 1974. p. 3.
- "Porn King and Wife Jailed over Vice Ring". The Guardian. 2 July 1994. p. 10.
- "Pornographer's 'deal' in police bribes case". The Guardian. 3 March 1977. p. 4.
- "Pornography trial witness 'named 42 policemen'". The Times. 3 March 1977. p. 4.
- "Sir Robert Mark". The Times. 2 October 2010. p. 90.
- "Soho club owner gets 8 years". The Guardian. 26 April 1974. p. 8.
- "Soho club owner charged". The Times. 10 January 1974. p. 4.
- "Strip-club owner jailed for eight years". The Times. 26 April 1974. p. 2.
- "Suspended term for woman". The Guardian. 31 August 1973. p. 6.
- "Suspension for Flying Squad head". The Guardian. 7 March 1972. p. 1.
- Sweeney, Christopher (15 June 1977). "Yard chief 'on pornography payroll'". The Guardian. p. 2.
- "Vice raids". The Guardian. 5 January 1974. p. 1.
- Weir, Andrew (4 July 1994). "Jimmy and Rusty". The Independent. p. 2.
- Windsor, John (29 January 1973). "Police launch 50 anti-porn raids at dawn". The Guardian. p. 5.
- "Woman and 10 men are remanded after raids by crime squad". The Times. 31 January 1973. p. 3.

==== Websites ====
- Clark, Gregory (2019). "The Annual RPI and Average Earnings for Britain, 1209 to Present (New Series)". MeasuringWorth.
- "Productions – Film4". Film4 Productions.
- "Sexual Offences Act 1956". www.legislation.gov.uk.

==== Other ====
- "James W Humphreys", England & Wales, Civil Registration Marriage Index, vol. 5d, General Register Office, p. 1413, 1976
- "James William Humphreys", England & Wales, Civil Registration Death Index, 1916-2007, vol. B85A, General Register Office, p. 251, 2003
- The Porn King, the Stripper and the Bent Coppers (Television production). Secret History. Channel 4. 18 May 1998.
