= Darkey =

Darkey, Darkie or Darky is a given name, nickname and surname. Notable people with the name include:

== People ==
=== Nickname ===
- David Bedell-Sivright (1880–1915), Scottish international rugby union player nicknamed Darkie
- Harlond Clift (1912–1992), American Major League Baseball player nicknamed Darkie
- Richard Darkie Hutton (1849–1921), reformed criminal and Salvation Army officer
- Dorcas Darkey Kelly (died 1761), Irish brothel-keeper and alleged serial killer burned at the stake
- Paddy Prendergast (racehorse trainer) (1910–1980), Irish racehorse trainer nicknamed Darkie

=== Other people ===
- Darkey, a disparaging term for a black person
- Darkey Africa, South African politician and diplomat
- Darkie Ellis (1914–1946), British boxer born Cyril Hills
- Joe Darkey (born 1942), Ghanaian former professional boxer
- Darkkey Nagaraja, a malaysian tamil musician

== Fictional characters ==
- Joe Darkie, protagonist of Darkie's Mob, a British comic war story published in the weekly anthology Battle Picture Weekly from 1976 to 1977
- The title character of The War of Darkie Pilbeam, a 1968 British three-part television movie
