= London bus bombing =

London bus bombing may refer to:

- Aldwych bus bombing, 1996, by the IRA
- Tavistock Square bus bombing, part of the 7 July 2005 London bombings

== See also ==
- 1978 London bus attack, by Palestinian militants
