= Aliens Restriction Act 1914 =

Aliens Restriction Act 1914 (Note: Section 2(1).)
- Act of Parliament
- Parliament of the United Kingdom
- Long title: An Act to enable His Majesty in time of war or imminent national danger or great emergency by Order in Council to impose Restrictions on Aliens and make such provisions as appear necessary or expedient for carrying such restrictions into effect.
- Citation: 4 & 5 Geo. 5. c. 12
- Territorial extent: United Kingdom

Dates
- Royal assent: 5 August 1914
- Commencement: 5 August 1914 (Note: The Acts of Parliament (Commencement) Act 1793.)
- Repealed: 1 January 1973 (Note: The Immigration Act 1971 (Commencement) Order 1972 (SI 1972/1514).)
Other legislation
Amended by	Aliens Restriction (Amendment) Act 1919; Former Enemy Aliens (Disabilities Removal) Act 1925; Statute Law Revision Act 1927; Merchant Shipping Act 1970
Repealed by	Immigration Act 1971
Relates to	British Nationality and Status of Aliens Act 1914

Status: Repealed

Text of statute as originally enacted

The Aliens Restriction Act 1914 (4 & 5 Geo. 5. c. 12) was an act of the Parliament of the United Kingdom that recceived its assent on 5 August 1914. It was granted royal assent the day after the United Kingdom declaration of war upon Germany. The Act gave the British Government extensive emergency powers to regulate and restrict aliens within and trying to enter Britain. These powers included highly restricted entry into Britain as well as great control over aliens that lived within its borders, especially those deemed as "enemy aliens" such as aliens from Germany. After the war's end its powers were continued and expanded by the Aliens Restriction (Amendment) Act 1919 (9 & 10 Geo. 5. c. 92), allowing the government to continue using the 1914 act from 1919 to 1920 and to investigate former enemy aliens "For the purpose of enforcing the provisions of" the forthcoming peace treaty. The frameworks set up by both Acts were effectively continued after 1920 by the Aliens Order 1920. Twelve of the 1919 act's sixteen sections were repealed by Acts between 1925 and 1979, especially by the Immigration Act 1971, with the other four remaining in force today.

== Historical background ==
Before the Aliens Restriction Act 1914 it was relatively easy for immigrants to enter within Britain. Immigrants did not have to produce a passport or undergo any form of mandatory inspection when arriving in Britain through major ports. It was only after a committee meeting by parliament in 1889, that officers were requested to start keeping track of the number of immigrants that entered British ports. At this time British parliament generally lacked the power to deny immigrants or deport them with an exception for Irish migrants who could be deported. The Aliens Act of 1905 is what sparked a major turning point. Anti-alien ideas had grown strong in Britain and the public influenced the passing of this act. The act made it so that immigrants were interrogated at ports and questioned whether or not they were capable of supporting themselves and their families.British pre-war control of immigration mainly consisted of monitoring and regulating ships and ports that brought in immigrants. Even immigrants who were denied had the right to appeal to such rulings. The 1905 Act also contained an asylum provision. Those who were seeking admission to the country to escape political or religious persecution would be admitted. This was influenced by the arrival of Jewish immigrants who were escaping persecution in Eastern Europe. Even though the Aliens Restriction Act of 1905 was established to restrict immigrants, Parliament still felt it was necessary to help those in need. These provisions were terminated with the arrival of the 1914 Act. With the introduction of the first world war much stricter regulations for the treatment of foreign nationals(Aliens) were introduced. Government officials had been planning these changes since 1910. The new act was first introduced to parliament in August of 1914. The act was meant to support the nationalist public ideals of keeping "enemy aliens" from coming or staying within the country's borders. This hostility was mainly pointed at German immigrants. Through fear of Germany and their military power, newspapers and novels popularized the idea that all Germans were spies and enemies of Britain. Especially at the beginning of the war, the public demanded the monitoring and deportation of these "enemy aliens" living in Britain. This further pushed support for wartime restrictions on foreign nationals.

== Provisions of the Act ==
Building on the restrictions of the Aliens Act 1905 (5 Edw. 7 c. 13), the act enabled the UK government to use Orders in Council rather than primary legislation to place restrictions on places foreigners (then legally known as aliens) could live, leave and arrive in the United Kingdom, to appoint officials to enforce them, to introduce a system of registration for foreigners, to give police officers power of arrest in cases brought under the Orders and to oblige ships' masters to enforce those Orders. Penalties for contravention and for refusing to pay required recognizances were set at six months' imprisonment with or without hard labour. The Act and the Orders also placed the burden of proof for proving their status on foreigners themselves. One of the most notable innovations arising from the Act was the Metropolitan Police's Aliens Registration Office, opened in 1915.

== Wartime implementation ==
Immediately following the Aliens restriction Act, the Aliens Restriction Order of 5 August 1914 created heavily increased surveillance on British "internal enemies". These foreign nationals were required to register at their nearest police station and provide major details about themselves: nationality, birthplace, age, gender, occupation, distinctive marks, place of residence and business, military service to foreign military and a photograph. This information was also required from members of their households. To include as many foreign/enemy nationals as possible, British householders were required to report the presence of a German national to their local police station. Many of these foreign nationals before the war were unaware about how much data was being tracked about them and their lives. During wartime the secrecy was gone and the were required to give confidential information up themselves. Many of these foreign nationals felt quite uncomfortable revealing all of their sensitive information to complete strangers. Those who failed to register themselves were brought to trial and faced with heavy fines or imprisonment with hard labor. Within the first few days of the order thousands of foreign nationals were lined up at police stations to register and by October of 1914 over 70,000 of these "enemy aliens' had been registered. The freedom to move from place to place without supervision that these aliens enjoyed pre-war was gone and the were tracked and watched everywhere they went. The first order under the Aliens restriction act required that enemy aliens could only enter and leave Britain through approved ports and with possession of a special permit. Aliens who tried to travel could not go any further than five miles from their registered homes without police authorization and had to report all of their movements to the police. Enemy Aliens were also prohibited from living in certain parts of Britain, like along the coast, and these areas were determined by the police. Many aliens left Britain all together within the first few days of the new act.

== Legacy ==
The practices that had been established in order to monitor aliens and watch for potential threats during the war, were continued years after. With the introduction of the Aliens Restriction act of 1919 and the Aliens order of 1920, immigration officers kept their expanded wartime powers over aliens. Passports and visas became mandatory. From fears of aliens taking British jobs by the public, aliens were required to have labor permits if they wanted to work within the country. With war over, Parliament could no longer use national security as an reason for the extreme measures taken against aliens but they continued to do so. Officials were reluctant to give up their increased powers, they considered these powers as an essential for public safety. In the beginning only "enemy aliens" had to register themselves to the police and report their movements. In 1916 this rule expanded to all aliens significantly limiting their freedoms. It wasnt until the createion of the Immigrants act of 1971 that the 1914 Act was repealed. The 1971 created a better established and more modern system that is still used today.
