= Boyle Street =

Boyle Street could refer to

- Boyle Street, Edmonton, Canada
- Boyle Street, London, England
