= Vice Unit =

Vice Unit or vice unit may refer to:

- Vice squad, generally a police division to restrain or suppress moral crimes
- Clubs and Vice Unit, a former unit of London's Metropolitan Police
