= Cyril Ellis =

Cyril Ellis may refer to:

- Darkie Ellis (Cyril Ellis, 1918–1950), British boxer
- Cyril Ellis (athlete) (1904–1973), British athlete
