= Bernie Silver =

English crime boss (1922–2002)

- Born: Bernard Silver; December 1922; Hackney, London, England
- Died: 2002 (aged 79–80); Westminster, London, England
- Other name: King of Soho
- Spouse: Joyce
- Children: Gerard (Son)
- Conviction: Murder

Bernard Silver (December 1922 – 2002) was an English criminal, who was a leading crime boss in the London underworld of the 1950s to 1970s. Active in prostitution, pornography and racketeering, Silver was described as "a working-class East Ender with a taste for fine restaurants and flashy clothes."

== History ==
Silver was born in Hackney, London, into a Jewish family to Emily V (née Saunders) and Louis Silver, and had three younger brothers.

Silver's rise to prominence began in the mid 1950s with the absorption of the remnants of the Messina Brothers prostitution operation into what came to be known as "The Syndicate", a criminal organisation headed principally by Silver and former Maltese traffic policeman "Big Frank" Mifsud who worked in olive oil importation when he first came to London. In 1956, Silver was arrested and charged with living off immoral earnings but was inexplicably let off by the judge who decided there was no case to answer. Starting off with one stripclub in Brewer Street, by the late 1960s the duo controlled 19 of the 24 stripclubs in Soho.

During the heyday of the Syndicate (1967–1972), most of the Metropolitan Police Obscene Publications Squad were in its pay, including the squad's head, Detective Chief Superintendent Bill Moody.

Silver's influence began to wane as the 1970s wore on, a decline prompted by major investigations into police corruption that by the end of 1972 had led to the resignation of eighty detectives. The discovery of a detailed ledger of the Syndicate's police payoffs during a raid on the home of Silver's associate Jimmy Humphreys led to the dismissal or forced retirement of hundreds of Metropolitan Police officers; corruption trials in 1976–77 resulted in thirteen detectives—including two ex-Commanders, the highest-ranking British police officers ever to be convicted of corruption—being sentenced to a total of 90 years in prison.

In 1973, Silver was again arrested and charged with living off immoral earnings for renting out a room above one of their stripclubs to dancers who also worked as prostitutes. He was sentenced to 6 years in prison, with Mifsud going on the run before getting caught in Switzerland and deported back to England. However, Mifsud appealed and got his sentenced quashed and he then returned to his native Malta.

Silver was convicted on 8 July 1975 of the 25 June 1956 murder of Tommy "Scarface" Smithson. He was sentenced to life imprisonment for murder and to ten years imprisonment for conspiracy to murder, but later cleared on appeal. Smithson was a former boxer and navy merchant stoker who had been attempting to control prostitution in Soho.

Silver's later activities and death in 2002 remain unreported. However, he was a director of "JOEL Limited" from 1992 and re-located from London to Home Farm in Newton, Rugby with his wife Joyce and son Gerard. He died in Westminster, London.

== In popular culture ==
The film character Lew Vogel in the 2008 film The Bank Job is based on Silver. Vogel is played by David Suchet.

== See also ==
- Metropolitan Police Clubs & Vice Unit
- Operation Countryman
