= William Haines (artist) =

English painter

William Haines (21 June 1778 – 24 July 1848) was an English engraver and painter.

== Early life ==
Haines was born at Bedhampton, Hampshire, on 21 June 1778; but taken in infancy to Chichester he always regarded that city as his native place. He was educated at the Midhurst grammar school, witnessing while there the destruction by fire of Cowdray House. Two years after that disaster he was with Thew, the engraver, at Northaw, Hertfordshire, where, when sufficiently proficient, he worked with Scriven and others on the Boydell-Shakespeare plates.

== Travels ==
In 1800 he went to the Cape of Good Hope; his ship, outsailed by the convoy, successfully resisting on the voyage an attack by a French privateer. At Cape Town and in excursions up the country he made numerous drawings (Caffres, Hottentots, &c.), resembling Catlin's later American pictures. From the Cape he passed to Philadelphia, where he engraved a number of book illustrations (‘Johnson's Poets,’ ‘Bradford's British Classics,’ &c.) and some portraits (Drs. Barton and Rush, Sir W. Jones, Franklin, &c.).

== Career in England ==
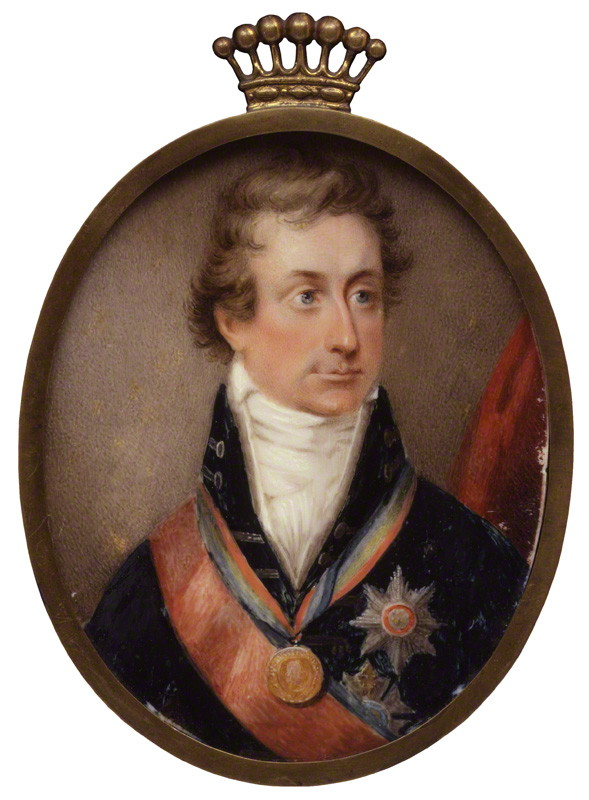
Percy Clinton Sydney Smythe, 6th Viscount Strangford, in a c.1808 miniature by Haines.

Returning to England he commenced (1805) work in London, adding miniature-painting to his practice as an engraver, which brought him again to Chichester and his connections there. Hayley (for whose ‘Life of Romney’ he had engraved a plate) warmly befriended him, and on his recommendation he proceeded (after his Chichester engagements were concluded) to Southampton, but with little result.

Again in London his professional prospects improved; he adopted a larger scale, and ultimately painted in oils. Among his many sitters for miniatures at 1 Boyle Street, London, where he resided 1816-30 and built a studio, were Lords Strangford and Portarlington, Lord Fitzroy Somerset (afterwards Lord Raglan), Sir Andrew Barnard, and other Peninsula officers; the Earl Stanhope (engraved by Reynolds), Sir Charles Forbes, Baron Garrow, Legh, the traveller, Salamè, interpreter; Lady Anne Barnard, the Misses Porter, Moore, Theodore Hook, Miss Stephens. He painted portraits in oils of Buchanan McMillan and Captain (Sir E.) Parry (both engraved by Reynolds).

== Death ==
Haines retired to East Brixton, where he died 24 July 1848.

== References and sources ==
Sources

- This article incorporates text from a publication now in the public domain: Stephen, Leslie; Lee, Sidney, eds. (1890). "Haines, William". Dictionary of National Biography. Vol. 24. London: Smith, Elder & Co.
