= Clubs and Vice Unit =

Former operational command unit of London's Metropolitan Police

The Clubs and Vice Unit was an operational command unit of London's Metropolitan Police which provided advice and practical support to other units in the Metropolitan Police concerning the policing of nightclubs, vice and obscene publications.

== History ==
Established in 1932 as the 'C' Division Clubs and Vice Unit, the unit later became better known as the "Clubs Office" and was based at West End Central Police Station.

Historically, the unit dealt primarily with prostitution, later introducing nightclubs, gaming and casinos. During the 1960s and with improved technology, its focus had moved on to criminal activity, including drugs, criminal control of clubs and brothels and the obscene publications industry.

The base in Vine Street was requisitioned to become the Aliens Registration Office in August 1939, so the unit was temporarily closed. It reopened in October in a secret meeting in a public house in Leicester Square for officers to take instructions and collect their expenses. In 1941, the Unit moved onto the third floor of the new West End Central Police Station. This location, near Soho Division, was crucial as Soho has been the most famous red light district in the United Kingdom since the mid-19th century.

During the Second World War, the vice scene in the west end of London thrived due mainly to the number of overseas soldiers based in England, many of whom visited Soho. The proprietors of unlicensed clubs in Soho were breaching licensing laws but these also became a haven for prostitution and organised crime. The unit's officers performed covert operations to tackle these problems.

Legislation has affected the work and direction of the unit over the years. When the Street Offences Act came into force in 1959 the majority of prostitutes left the street, practically overnight, for fear of imprisonment and the fine for living off immoral earnings which increased.

The Obscene Publications Act 1964 brought extra responsibilities when the unit was given the task of enforcing the act. As a result, obscenity became a new part of its terms of reference.

The unit reached its lowest ebb in the early 1970s, when chronic allegations of corruption came to a head with the detailed exposure in 1972 of systematic payments by the pornographer James Humphreys led to 17 policemen, including DCI George Fenwick, head of the Obscene Publications Squad, his direct superior DCS Bill Moody, Commander Wallace Virgo, the head of the Serious Crime Squad, in overall charge of the unit, and Commander Kenneth Drury, head of the Flying Squad. As the ensuing corruption investigations widened, the Obscene Publications Squad was replaced in its entirety with a new group of officers drawn from the uniformed branch and more than 20 detectives were dismissed or required to resign. When the cases ultimately came to trial in 1977, the presiding judge, Mr Justice Mars-Jones, summarised those involved as having engaged in "corruption on a scale which beggars description".

As a result of this corruption, officers were changed to predominantly uniformed officers who were thought to be less corrupt than their CID counterparts. There was also a rotation system where officers were posted to the unit for a maximum of 12 months and then returned to their police stations. In practice, some returned within a matter of weeks.

New challenges have arisen from the introduction of the Licensing Act 2003 (with the potential for 24-hour drinking) and the Gambling Act 2005 (with significant deregulation of gaming). With new legislation expected that covers the possession of "extreme obscenity" the work of the Clubs and Vice Unit continues apace.

In 2014, the unit was merged into the Metropolitan Police's Human Trafficking Command and the focus on clubs and vice was reduced.

== Role ==
The Clubs and Vice Unit was split into five sections:

The Clubs Unit is split into three teams: the Proactive Licensing team, Proactive Crime team and the Gaming team. All three units' primary responsibility is to generate intelligence-led operations against organised criminals who use licensed premises to supply illegal drugs and gaming establishments to commit gaming fraud. They also support Basic Command Units (BOCU) in tackling licensed premises associated with serious violence and disorder.

The Obscene Publications Unit targets people who manufacture and distribute obscene material through shops, mail order, complex distribution networks and the Internet. Particular attention is focused on the most extreme and/or exploitative material.

The Taskable Unit assists BOCUs with offences occurring on the street such as kerb crawling, street prostitution and the advertising of brothels in public phone boxes, known as "carding". It also provides resources to other units within Clubs and Vice.

The Vice Unit provides a centre of investigative excellence to monitor London's off-street prostitution and in so doing protect the most vulnerable adult and child prostitution victims and seek to investigate and prosecute those who exploit them. Emphasis is placed on rescuing trafficked and coerced victims. The unit also provides support and guidance to borough officers who come into contact with these offenders and victims.

The Intelligence Unit provides field intelligence for the proactive teams. The unit includes a dedicated Source team; Counter Terrorism and Promoters focus desks and the Financial Investigation Unit.

== See also ==
- Paedophile Unit, which was once the Obscene Publications Squad of the Clubs and Vice Unit
