= Aliens Restriction (Amendment) Act 1919 =

Act of the Parliament of the United Kingdom

Aliens Restriction (Amendment) Act 1919 (Note: Section 16(1).)
- Act of Parliament
- Parliament of the United Kingdom
- Long title: An Act to continue and extend the provisions of the Aliens Restriction Act, 1914.
- Citation: 9 & 10 Geo. 5. c. 92
- Territorial extent: United Kingdom

Dates
- Royal assent: 23 December 1919
- Commencement: 23 December 1919 (Note: The Acts of Parliament (Commencement) Act 1793.)
Other legislation
Amends	Aliens Restriction Act 1914
Repeals/revokes	Aliens Act 1905
Amended by	Former Enemy Aliens (Disabilities Removal) Act 1925; Statute Law Revision Act 1927; Statute Law (Repeals) Act 1971; Immigration Act 1971; Statute Law (Repeals) Act 1975; Merchant Shipping Act 1979; Law Reform (Miscellaneous Provisions) (Scotland) Act 1980; Merchant Shipping Act 1995; Criminal Justice Act 2003

Status: Amended

Text of statute as originally enacted

Revised text of statute as amended

Text of the Aliens Restriction (Amendment) Act 1919 as in force today (including any amendments) within the United Kingdom, from legislation.gov.uk.

The Aliens Restriction (Amendment) Act 1919 (9 & 10 Geo. 5. c. 92) is an act of the Parliament of the United Kingdom originally aimed at continuing and extending the provisions of the Aliens Restriction Act 1914 (4 & 5 Geo. 5. c. 12), and the British Nationality and Status of Aliens Act 1914 (c. 17) and to deal with former enemy aliens after the end of the World War I. The 1914 acts were due to expire once the Paris Peace Conference formally ended the war.

It provided the authority to produce the Aliens Order 1920 (SR&O 1920/448).

After subsequent amendment and repeal, what remains comprises section 3 on sedition and promoting industrial unrest, section 6 on the civil service, section 8 on juries, section 13 on offences and penalties, and section 16 giving the short title.

== Section 1 - Continuance of emergency powers ==
This section continued the powers of the Aliens Restriction Act 1914 for one year. Technically, it only continued section 1 of the 1914 act, but that contained all the substantive provisions of what was a two-section act. Section 1 of the 1919 act was itself repeatedly continued, one year at a time, by expiring laws continuance acts passed annually through to 1970. It was repealed by section 34(1) of, and schedule 6 to, the Immigration Act 1971.

== Section 2 - Extension of powers ==
Section 2(1) was repealed by section 34(1) of, and schedule 6 to, the Immigration Act 1971.

Section 2(2) was repealed by part V of the schedule to the Statute Law (Repeals) Act 1971.

== Section 3 - Incitement to sedition, etc ==
1. If any alien attempts or does any act calculated or likely to cause sedition or disaffection amongst any of His Majesty's Forces or the forces of His Majesty's allies, or amongst the civilian population, he shall be liable on conviction on indictment to penal servitude for a term not exceeding ten years, or on summary conviction to imprisonment for a term not exceeding three months.
2. If any alien promotes or attempts to promote industrial unrest in any industry in which he has not been bona fide engaged for at least two years immediately preceding in the United Kingdom, he shall be liable on summary conviction to imprisonment for a term not exceeding three months.

In 1977, the Law Commission recommended that this section be repealed.

The words "a fine not exceeding level 3 on the standard scale" are prospectively substituted for the words "imprisonment for a term not exceeding three months" in section 3(2) by paragraph 153 of schedule 32 to the Criminal Justice Act 2003.

== Section 7 - Restriction of change of name by aliens ==
In Brunning v Kollross, the divisional court held that an alien, who carried on a business (which he acquired in 1921) under the trade name by which the business was known before the outbreak of war in 1914, was not infringing the provisions of section 7 of this Act, by continuing to carry on the business under that name.

As to the effect of adding the words "& Co" to the name, see Evans v Piauneau.

== Section 10 - Admission of former enemy aliens ==
The restrictions imposed by this section expired on 23 December 1922.

== Section 11 - Temporary restriction on acquisition by former enemy aliens of certain kinds of property ==
The restrictions imposed by this section expired on 23 December 1922.

== Section 12 - Employment of former enemy aliens in British ships ==
Section 12 of the act was repealed by schedule 2 to the Former Enemy Aliens (Disabilities Removal) Act 1925 (15 & 16 Geo. 5. c. 43).

== Subsequent developments ==
Section 9, 10, 11 of the act was repealed by section 1 of, and the part I of the schedule to, the Statute Law Revision Act 1927 (17 & 18 Geo. 5. c. 42), which came into force on 22 December 1927.

Section 5 of the act was repealed by section 101(4) of, and schedule 5 to, the Merchant Shipping Act 1970.

Sections 2(2), 7, 14(2), 15 and 16(2) of the act were repealed by section 1 of, and the part V of the schedule to, the Statute Law (Repeals) Act 1971, which came into force on 27 July 1971.

Sections 13(3) and 14(1) of the act was repealed by section 34(1) of, and schedule 6 to, the Immigration Act 1971.

Section 8 of the act were repealed by section 64(2) of, and part I of schedule 6 to, the Criminal Justice Act 1972, but this repeal was never commencement.

Section 4 of the act was repealed by section 52(2) of, and part II of schedule 7 to, the Merchant Shipping Act 1979.

== See also ==
- Alien (law)

== Bibliography ==
- "The Aliens Restriction (Amendment) Act, 1919". Halsbury's Statutes of England. (The Complete Statutes of England). 1929. Volume 1: . Page 203 et seq.
- "Aliens Restriction (Amendment) Act 1919". Halsbury's Statutes of England. Second Edition. 1948. Volume 1. Page 693 et seq.
- "Aliens Restriction (Amendment) Act 1919". Halsbury's Statutes of England. Third Edition. Butterworths. 1968. Volume 1. Page 917 et seq. See further "Preliminary Note" at page 860.
- W de Bracy Herbert (ed). The Practical Statutes of the Session 1920. The Field Press Ltd. Law Times Office, Windsor House, Bream's Buildings, London. 1920. Page 401 et seq. Google
- W H Aggs. "Aliens Restriction (Amendment) Act, 1919". Chitty's Statutes of Practical Utility. Sixth Edition. Sweet & Maxwell. 1920. Ninth annual continuation volume (Statutes of Practical Utility passed in 1919). Part 1 of Volume 20. Page 16 et seq.
- J W Scobell Armstrong. "Aliens Restriction (Amendment) Act, 1919". War and Treaty Legislation, 1914-1922. Hutchinson and Co. Paternoster Row, London. Page 162 et seq. Google
- William Evan Davies. "Aliens Restriction (Amendment) Act, 1919". The English Law Relating to Aliens. Stevens and Sons Limited. London. 1931. Page 118 et seq. Google
- E J Hayward. "Aliens". Stone's Justices' Manual: being the Yearly Justices' Practice for 1944. Butterworth & Co. 1944. Page 346 et seq. Google
- R F Burnand, B G Burnett-Hall, D Bolland and J E Watts. The Annual Practice 1949. Sixty-sixth Annual Issue. Sweet and Maxwell. Stevens and Sons. Butterworth & Co. London. Volume 1. Pages 901 and 1421.
- Halsbury's Laws of England (The Laws of England). Supplement No 21. 1931.
- Supplement No 15. 1925. Paragraphs 1:674, 1:682, 1:705, 1:710, 1:715, 1:713, 1:725, 7:139, 18:561, 21:616 and 26:934
- The English and Empire Digest. Butterworth & Co. 1958. Replacement Volume 2: . Pages 180, 182 and 190. See further title "Aliens". * Skottowe (ed). The English and Empire Digest. Cumulative Supplement, bringing the work up to 1939. 1939. Title "Volume II: Aliens". Pages 52 to 54.
- Supplement No 2. 1927. p 102 et seq
