= Aliens Order 1920 =

- Statutory Rules and Orders
- Parliament of the United Kingdom
- Citation: SR&O 1920/448

Dates
- Made: 25 March 1920

Other legislation
- Made under: Aliens Restriction Act 1914; Aliens Restriction (Amendment) Act 1919
- Repealed by: Aliens Order 1953

Status: Revoked

The Aliens Order 1920 (SR&O 1920/448) was a British statutory instrument created under the Aliens Restriction (Amendment) Act 1919 that extended powers over the entry of immigrants into the country. The order made passports obligatory, and it was brought out in the context of a period of widespread unemployment following the First World War. As a result of the order, all aliens seeking employment, or residence, were required to register with the police and a 'central register of aliens' was maintained under the direction of the Home Secretary, who was Edward Shortt at the time the order came about.

The order also required that all aliens entering Britain to be subjected to a medical evaluation, and it further permitted immigration officers to refuse entry to anyone deemed "a lunatic, idiot, or mentally deficient" or if "for medical reasons his admission is undesirable," so long as the determination be "certified by a medical inspector". Inspection did not usually require a medical officer, but was largely in the domain of immigration.

This order remained in force until it was replaced by the Aliens Order 1953 (SI 1953/1671).
