= John Trusler =

English divine, literary compiler and medical empiric

Revd John Trusler (1735–1820) was an eccentric English divine, literary compiler, and medical empiric.

== Early life ==
Trusler was born in Hanover Square, London, England, in July 1735. His father was the proprietor of the public tea gardens at Marylebone. In his tenth year, he was sent to Westminster School, and at the age of fifteen he was transferred to Mr Fountaine's fashionable seminary at Marylebone. Next he proceeded to Emmanuel College, Cambridge, whence he graduated B.A. in 1757. On his return home he translated from the Italian several burlettas and adapted them to the English stage. One of these, he says, was 'La Serva Padrona,' or the 'Servant-Mistress,' of Giovanni Battista Pergolesi, performed in Marylebone Gardens in 1757; but it seems that the real translator was Stephen Storace.

== Ordination ==
Trusler took holy orders, becoming a priest in 1759. He was curate successively of Enford, Wiltshire, of Ware, Hertfordshire, at Hertford, at the Hythe church, Colchester, of Ockley, Surrey, and of St Clement Danes in the Strand, London. In 1761, Dr Bruce, the king's chaplain at Somerset House, employed him as his assistant and procured for him the chaplaincy to the Poultry Compter. He also held a lectureship in the city. At this period he took a house at Rotherhithe.

However, clerical work was not enough for Trusler. In 1762, he established an academy for teaching oratory 'mechanically,' but, as it did not pay, he soon gave it up. To acquire a knowledge of physic he admitted himself a perpetual pupil of Drs Hunter and Fordyce. He then went to Leyden University to take the degree of M.D., but his name does not appear in the catalogue of graduates in that university. However, he either obtained or assumed the title of doctor, and he is frequently styled LL.D. He superintended for some time the Literary Society established in 1765 with the object of abolishing publishers.

In 1769, Trusler sent circulars to every parish in England and Ireland proposing to print in script type, in imitation of handwriting, about a hundred and fifty sermons at the price of one shilling each, to save the clergy both study and the trouble of transcribing. This scheme appears to have met with success. Trusler next established a printing and bookselling business upon an extensive and lucrative scale. At one time he resided in Red Lion Street, Clerkenwell, and also at Boyle Street. He afterwards lived at Bath on the profits of his trade, and subsequently on an estate of his own at Englefield Green, Middlesex. In 1806, he published at Bath the first part of his autobiography, entitled The Memoirs of the Life of the Revd. Dr. Trusler, 4to. Only part i. appeared, and, it is said, the author sought to suppress it. The remainder of the memoirs in Trusler's autograph were in 1851 in the possession of James Crossley of Manchester. Trusler died in 1820 at the Villa House, Bathwick, Bath. He married in 1759, his wife dying in December 1762. His portrait has been engraved.

== Selected publications ==
Among Trusler's numerous publications are:

- ‘The Difference between Words esteemed Synonyms, in the English Language; and the proper choice of them determined’ (anon.), 2 vols., London, 1766, 12mo. A second edition, with the author's name, appeared in 1783; third edition, 2 vols., 1794; reprinted 1835.
- ‘Hogarth Moralized. Being a complete edition of Hogarth's Works. Containing near fourscore copperplates,’ London, 1768, 8vo. This was published with the approval of the widow of the painter. There is a later edition, 2 vols., London, 1821, fol., with inferior impressions of the plates. The edition prepared by John Major, London, 1831, 8vo, contains a new set of plates, beautifully engraved. To the edition in two vols., 1838, 4to, ‘are added Anecdotes of the Author and his work by J. Hogarth and J. Nichols.’ Trusler's explanations of the plates are likewise included in ‘The Complete Works of Hogarth,’ London, 1861–2, 4to.
- ‘Chronology: or, a concise view of the Annals of England,’ London, 1769, 12mo; republished under the title of ‘Chronology, or the Historian's Vade Mecum,’ 4th edit., with great additions, London, 1772, 8vo; 14th edit., enlarged, 3 vols., 1792–1802.
- ‘Principles of Politeness,’ being a compilation from ‘Lord Chesterfield's Letters,’ 1775; 18th edit. [1790]; reprinted under the title of 'The New Chesterfield' [1836?].
- 'A descriptive Account of the Islands lately discovered in the South Seas. ... With some Account of the Country of Camchatka,' London, 1778, 8vo. This is an abridgment of 'Cooke's Voyages.’
- 'Practical Husbandry, or the Art of Farming, with certainty of gain,' London, 1780, 8vo; 5th edit., Bath, 1820, 8vo.
- 'Luxury no Political Evil' [1780?].
- 'Poetic Endings, or a Dictionary of Rhymes, single and double,' London, 1783, 12mo.
- 'A concise View of the Common and Statute Law of England,' 1784, being an abridgment of Blackstone's Commentaries.
- 'The Sublime Reader, or the Morning & Evening Services of the Church so pointed ... as to display all the Beauty and Sublimity of the Language,' 1784.
- 'Compendium of Useful Knowledge,' 1784.
- 'Modern Times, or the Adventures of Gabriel Outcast,' a satirical novel, in the manner of Gil Blas (anon.), 3 vols., 1785.
- 'The London Adviser and Guide,' 1786 and 1790.
- 'The Honours of the Table, or Rules for Behaviour during Meals; with the whole Art of Carving,' London, 1788, 12mo; 5th edit., Bath, 1795.
- 'A Compendium of Useful Knowledge,' London, 1788, 12mo; 6th edit., Bath [1800?], 12mo.
- 'The Habitable World described,' 20 vols. London, 1788–97, 8vo.
- 'Six Years Travel Through Tartary', 1788, translating the travels of Peter Simon Pallas in eastern Russia.
- 'The Progress of Man and Society,' with woodcuts by J. Bewick, Bath [1790?], 12mo; London, 1791, 12mo.
- 'Proverbs Exemplified, and illustrated by pictures from real life. ... With prints by J. Bewick,' London, 1790, 12mo.
- 'Life, or the Adventures of William Ramble, Esq.' (anon.), a novel, 3 vols., 1793.
- 'Monthly Communications,' a periodical publication, 1793.
- 'The Way to be Rich and Respectable,' 7th edit., London, 1796, 8vo.
- 'A Compendium of Sacred History,' 1797, being a compilation from Stackhouse's History of the Bible.
- 'A System of Etiquette.' Bath, 1804, 12mo; 3rd edit., London, 1828.
- 'Detached Philosophic Thoughts of the best Writers, ancient and modern, on Man, Life, Death, and Immortality,' 2 vols., Bath, [1810], 8vo.
- 'A Sure Way to lengthen Life with Vigor; particularly in Old Age; the result of Experience. Written by Dr. Trusler at the age of 84,' 2 vols., Bath, 1819, 8vo. This is based on 'A Sure Way to lengthen Life,' which was printed in 1770 and passed through five editions.

== Sources ==
- Autobiography; Annuaire Nécrologique, 1822, p. 339.
- Biographical Dictionary of Living Authors, 1816, pp. 355, 447.
- Critical Review, 1780, p. 442.
- Cromwell's Clerkenwell, p. 171.
- Pinks's Clerkenwell.
- Donaldson's Agricultural Biography, p. 65.
- The Gentleman's Magazine. 1778 p. 85, 1804 ii. 1105, 1820 ii. 89, 120, 1854 i. 114.
- London Chronicle, 18 January 1770, advertisement.
- Lowndes's Bibl. Man. (Bohn).
- Marshall's Catalogue of 500 celebrated Authors, 1788.
- New Monthly Magazine. 1820, ii. 353.
- Nichols's Life of Hogarth.
- Notes and Queries, 3rd ser. iii. 133, 5th ser. iv. 345.
- Rivers's Literary Memoirs of Living Authors, 1798, ii. 329.
- St. James's Chronicle, 26 January 1769.
- Catalogue of Dawson Turner's MSS. p. 287.
- Willis's Current Notes, 1853, p. 41.
- This article incorporates text from a publication now in the public domain: Lee, Sidney, ed. (1899). "Trusler, John". Dictionary of National Biography. Vol. 57. London: Smith, Elder & Co.
