= Darkie Hutton =

Envoy 'Darkie' Hutton - before and after conversion

Envoy Richard 'Darkie’ Hutton (1849 – 1921) was a reformed criminal and former member of the Charles Peace gang who spent 23 years in prison before he was converted and became an evangelist and Officer in The Salvation Army.

Because he was undersized and swarthy, Hutton was given the nickname ‘Darkie’. Hutton had been a thief from the age of eight when he stole a 1 lb weight from his tobacconist employer and sold it for a penny.

His family life was troubled with an alcoholic father, and while still a child he ran away to sea where he traveled to Quebec, Bombay, Shanghai and Calcutta, among other destinations. Twice he was court-martialed and, still in his teens, was dishonorably discharged from the navy. Shortly afterwards he began to work with the notorious English burglar and murderer Charles Peace, becoming involved in theft, burglary and armed robbery.

After being released from prison at the end of a six-month sentence for the theft of a gold pocket watch, Hutton was blackmailed into joining the notorious criminal gang ‘The Brotherhood of the Red Hand’. His first job for the Brotherhood ended in disaster when he was caught while making his getaway from a jewelry robbery in Reading; the police caught him in possession of £20,000 worth of jewelry. As a result, he was sent to Dartmoor Prison.

Upon his release from Dartmoor, where he had been treated harshly, Hutton returned to the Brotherhood of the Red Hand, quickly being ‘promoted’ to the gang's leader and deriving pleasure from the notoriety and prestige that this position offered him.

However, at a time when Hutton and his wife were living in abject poverty Salvation Army Captain Tom Watts persuaded him to attend his first Army meeting. Here Hutton listened to the testimony of converted drunkards and criminals. Looking back over his life, and the 23 years he had spent in prison, Hutton called on God to save him. From his first visit to the Mercy Seat onward Hutton's life began to change. A week later his wife came to a meeting and she too joined the Salvation Army.

Hutton became a 'Special' for the Salvation Army, an evangelist and preacher who traveled the country by invitation to speak at meetings and tell the story of his life. By special permission of the Home Secretary Herbert Gladstone Hutton would wear his prison clothes, chains and leg irons to lead Salvation Army meetings.

Hutton first conducted a special meeting at the Undercliffe Corps and he quickly received requests to preach from all over the country from other Salvation Army units. At these he would preach wearing his prison uniform and chains.

Envoy ’Darkie’ Hutton conducted many evangelistic tours until his death in 1921.
