= Overseas Visitors Records Offices =

Overseas Visitors Records Offices were police departments across the United Kingdom from 1915 to 2022. The best known example was that for the Metropolitan Police District (MPD), known from 1915 to the 1990s as the Aliens Registration Office.

They were initially set up to administer restrictions on and registration of enemy aliens living in the UK as stipulated in the Aliens Restriction Act 1914, but were continued post-war for all unnaturalised foreign residents. Until Brexit some categories, such as European Union citizens, were exempt and on 4 August 2022 the Home Office suspended the requirement to register, effectively abolishing the Offices.

== Aliens Registration Office ==
It was established in 1915 within C5 Branch, part of 'C' Department of the Metropolitan Police's central administration, succeeding an Emergency Department set up to fulfil the same role straight after the passing of the Act the previous year. Run by civil staff rather than police officers, it kept records with photographs of adult aliens looking for or holding a job for over three months or who remained in the MPD for over six months.

Some of the Office's records are held at the National Archives. It was based in the former Vine Street Police Station during the Second World War and at Brandon House, 180 Borough High Street from 1999 to 2022.
