= Former Enemy Aliens (Disabilities Removal) Act 1925 =

Act of the Parliament of the United Kingdom

Former Enemy Aliens (Disabilities Removal) Act 1925 (Note: Section 2(1).)
- Act of Parliament
- Parliament of the United Kingdom
- Long title: An Act to repeal certain enactments imposing disabilities on former enemy aliens.
- Citation: 15 & 16 Geo. 5. c. 43
- Territorial extent: United Kingdom (Note: Section 2(2).)

Dates
- Royal assent: 31 July 1925
- Commencement: The date certified by a Secretary of State as the date on which ratifications of the treaty were exchanged (Note: Section 2(3). The date was to be certified by notice published in the London Gazette, the Edinburgh Gazette and the Belfast Gazette.)
- Repealed: 23 July 1958
Other legislation
Amends	See § Repealed enactments
Repeals/revokes	See § Repealed enactments
Repealed by	Statute Law Revision Act 1958

Status: Repealed

Text of statute as originally enacted

The Former Enemy Aliens (Disabilities Removal) Act 1925 (15 & 16 Geo. 5. c. 43) was an act of the Parliament of the United Kingdom that repealed enactments imposing disabilities on the subjects, citizens and companies of former enemy countries in respect of the non-ferrous metal industry, service on board British ships and the carrying on of banking business in the United Kingdom.

The act was passed to enable the ratification of the Treaty of Commerce and Navigation between the United Kingdom and Germany, signed at London on 2 December 1924. A protocol annexed to that treaty, set out in the first schedule to the act, recorded an undertaking by His Britannic Majesty's Government to recommend to Parliament the legislation necessary to remove the disabilities affecting German citizens and German companies in the United Kingdom which did not extend to the subjects, citizens or companies of the most favoured foreign country. The preamble to the act recited that, once those disabilities were removed as respects German citizens and companies, it was also expedient that they be removed as respects the subjects, citizens and companies of the other former enemy countries to which they applied.

== Provisions ==
Section 1 provided that the enactments mentioned in the second schedule to the act which imposed disabilities on subjects, citizens and companies of former enemy countries in respect of the non-ferrous metal industry, service on board British ships registered in the United Kingdom, and the carrying on of banking business within the United Kingdom, should, as from the commencement of the act, be repealed to the extent specified in the third column of that schedule.

Section 2(1) provided that the act might be cited as the Former Enemy Aliens (Disabilities Removal) Act, 1925. Section 2(2) provided that the act extended to Northern Ireland. Section 2(3) provided that the act was to come into operation on such date as might be certified by a Secretary of State, by notice published in the London Gazette, the Edinburgh Gazette and the Belfast Gazette, to be the date on which ratifications of the treaty were exchanged.

The first schedule to the act set out the provision of the protocol annexed to the treaty, which identified the Non-Ferrous Metal Industry Act 1918, section 12 of the Aliens Restriction (Amendment) Act 1919 and section 2 of the Trading with the Enemy (Amendment) Act 1918 as the legislation whose disabilities were to be removed.

=== Repealed enactments ===
Section 1 of the act repealed 3 enactments, listed in the second schedule to the act.

Citation	Short title	Extent of repeal
7 & 8 Geo. 5. c. 67	Non-Ferrous Metal Industry Act 1918	The whole act.
8 & 9 Geo. 5. c. 31	Trading with the Enemy (Amendment) Act 1918	Section two.
9 & 10 Geo. 5. c. 92	Aliens Restriction (Amendment) Act 1919	In section five the words " other than former enemy aliens " and section twelve.

== Subsequent developments ==
The whole act was repealed by section 1 of, and the first schedule to, the Statute Law Revision Act 1958 (6 & 7 Eliz. 2. c. 46), which came into force on 23 July 1958.
