= West End Central Police Station =

Former police station in London

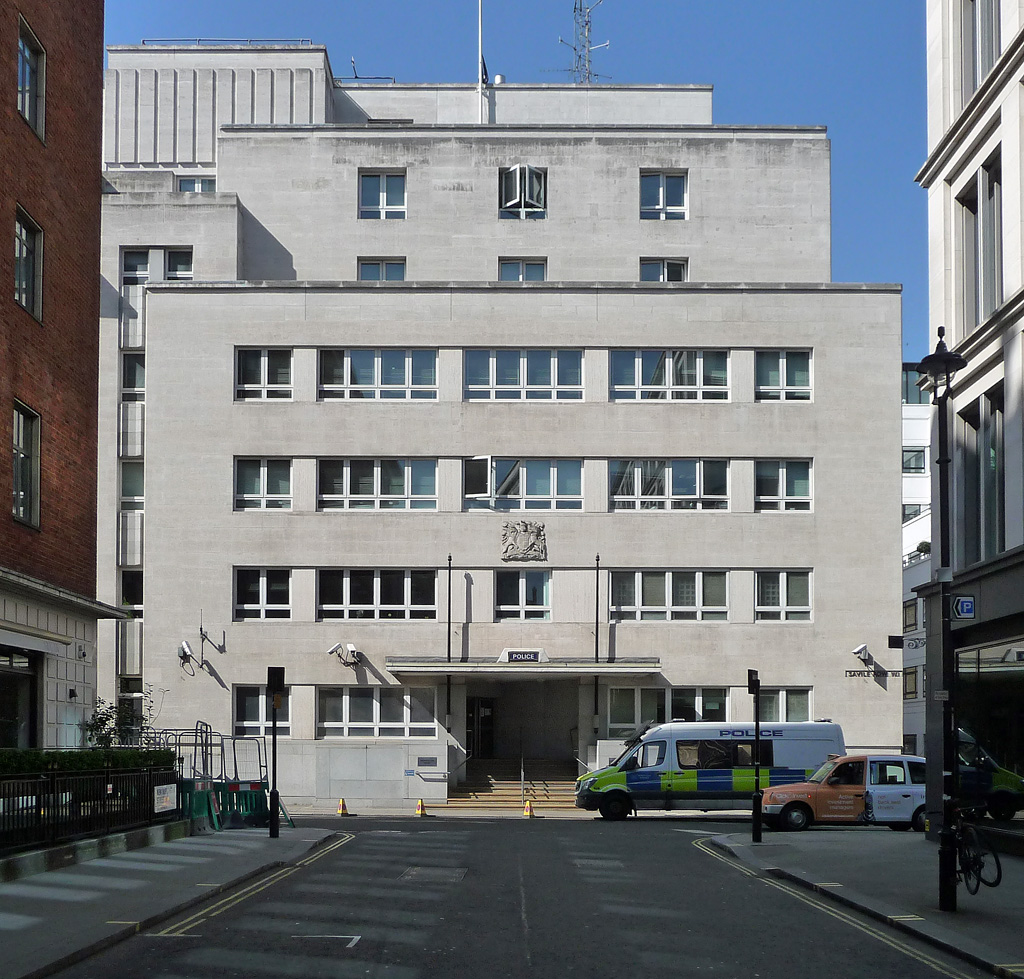
- Interactive map of the West End Central Police Station area

General information
- Location: Savile Row, Mayfair, London, England
- Coordinates: 51.5115°N 0.1412°W
- Opened: 1940
- Closed: 2017
- Client: Metropolitan Police

West End Central Police Station was a police station at 27 Savile Row in Mayfair in the West End of London, near the junction with Boyle Street. It was the headquarters of the 'C' division of the Metropolitan Police, station-code 'CD' (the letter D depicting it to be a divisional headquarters) covering the City of Westminster.

== History ==
The station was opened in 1940 and was also the station where officers were dispatched from to shut down The Beatles' rooftop concert on January 30, 1969, following noise complaints.

The front desk was closed in 2017. The station was subsequently sold to a private developer for a reported £50m.
