= HM Prison Dartmoor =

Men's prison in Princetown, England

HMP Dartmoor
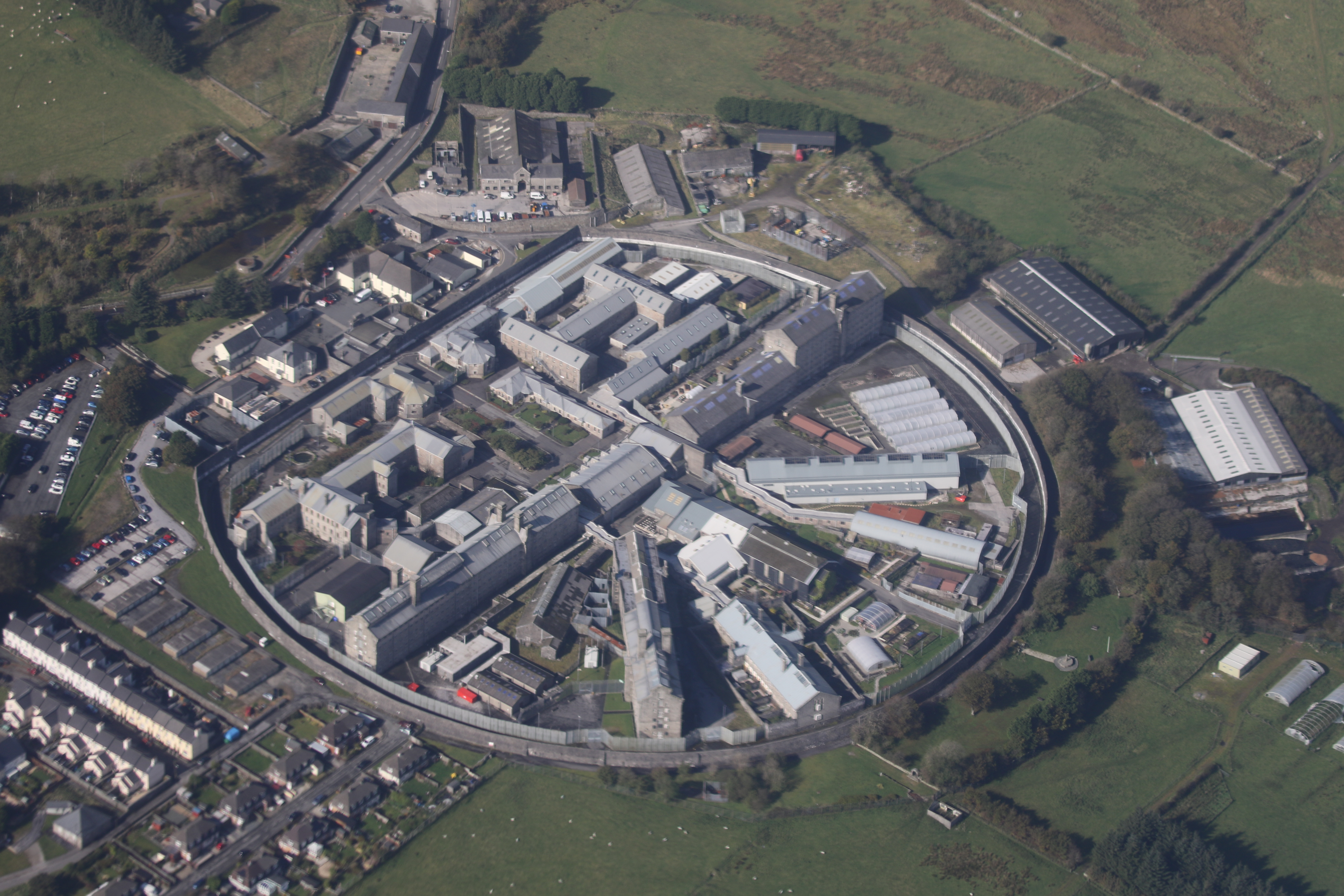
- Interactive map of HMP Dartmoor
- Location: Princetown, Devon; 50°32′59″N 3°59′46″W
- Security class: Adult Male/Category C
- Population: 640 (January 2016)
- Opened: 1809
- Closed: 2024 (temporarily)
- Managed by: HM Prison Services
- Governor: Steve Mead
- Website: Dartmoor at justice.gov.uk

HM Prison Dartmoor is a Category C men's prison, located in Princetown, high on Dartmoor in the English county of Devon. Its high granite walls dominate this area of the moor. The prison is owned by the Duchy of Cornwall, and is operated by His Majesty's Prison Service.

The prison closed temporarily in 2024 for radon mitigation and investigation works.

Dartmoor Prison was given Grade II heritage listing in 1987.

== History ==
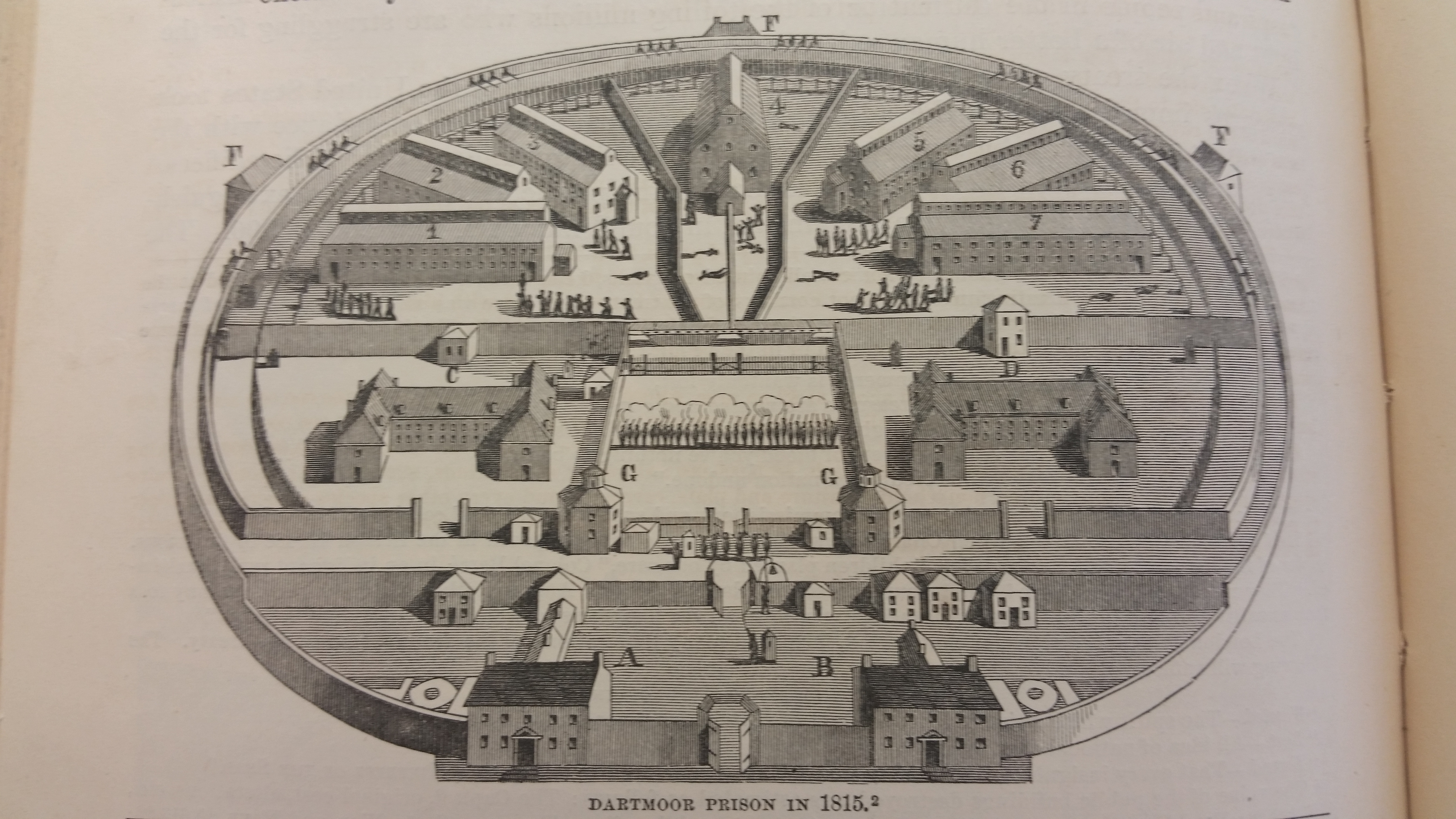
HM Dartmoor Prison, as it appeared in 1815

=== Prisoners of war ===
In 1805, the United Kingdom was at war with Napoleonic France, a conflict during which thousands of prisoners were taken and confined in prison "hulks" or derelict ships. This was considered a security risk, partially due to the proximity of the Royal Naval dockyard at Devonport (then called Plymouth Dock), and living conditions were appalling in the extreme; consequently, a prisoner of war depot was planned in the remote isolation of Dartmoor.

The prison was designed by Daniel Asher Alexander. Construction by local labour started in 1806, taking three years to complete. In 1809, the first French prisoners arrived and the prison was full by the end of the year.

From the spring of 1813 until March 1815, about 6,500 American sailors from the War of 1812 were imprisoned at Dartmoor in poor conditions (food was bad and the roofs leaked). These were either naval prisoners or impressed American seamen discharged from British vessels. Whilst the British were in overall charge of the prison, the prisoners created their own governance and culture. They had courts which meted out punishments, a market, a theatre and a gambling room. About 1,000 of the prisoners were Black. A recent examination of the General Entry Book of American Prisoners of War at Dartmoor, by Nicholas Guyatt, found "Eight Hundred and Twenty - Nine Sailors of Colour had been entered into the register by the end of October 1814."

=== Escapes ===
Unlike many detention facilities of the period, Dartmoor Prison was purpose built in an isolated location, ringed by high stone walls, and manned by hundreds of armed militia sentries. In addition a rope ran around the entire circumference of the prison, linked to a series of bells, which quickly spread an alarm. Even if a determined prisoner made it beyond the walls, he would still have to traverse ten miles on foot, over wild moorland and bogs, an area frequently beset with fog and chilling winds, to reach the nearest town. Local residents turning in an escapee could expect a reward of a guinea. Yet, despite these daunting odds, scholar Nicholas Guyatt has tallied a total of twenty-four American POWs successfully making their way to freedom.

Disorder

Although the war ended with the Treaty of Ghent on 24 December 1814, American prisoners of war remained in Dartmoor because the British government refused to grant them parole or to take any steps until the treaty was ratified by the United States Senate on 17 February 1815. It took several weeks for the American agent to secure ships for their transportation home, and the men grew very impatient. On 4 April, a food contractor attempted to work off some damaged hardtack on them in place of soft bread, but was forced to yield by their insurrection. The commandant, Captain T. G. Shortland, suspected them of a design to break out of the gaol. This was the reverse of the truth in general, as they would lose their chance of going on the ships, but a few had made threats of the sort, and the commandant was very uneasy.

At about 6:00 pm on 6 April, Shortland discovered a hole from one of the five prisons to the barrack yard near the gun racks. Some prisoners were outside the fence, noisily pelting each other with turf, and many more were near the breach (and the gambling tables), though the signal for return to prisons had sounded. Shortland was convinced of a plot, and rang the alarm bell to collect the officers and have the guards ready. This precaution brought back a crowd just going to quarters. Just then a prisoner broke a gate chain with an iron bar, and a number of the prisoners pressed through to the prison market square. After attempts at persuasion, Shortland ordered a charge which drove some of the prisoners in. Those near the gate, however, hooted at and taunted the soldiery, who fired a volley over their heads. The crowd yelled louder and threw stones, and the soldiers, probably without orders, fired a direct volley which killed and wounded a large number. Then they continued firing at the prisoners, many of whom were now struggling to get back inside the blocks.

Finally the captain, a lieutenant and the hospital surgeon (the other officers being at dinner) succeeded in stopping the shooting and started caring for the wounded – about 60, 30 seriously, besides seven killed outright. The affair was examined by a joint commission, Charles King for the United States and Francis Seymour Larpent for Great Britain, which exonerated Shortland, justified the initial shooting and blamed the subsequent deaths on unknown culprits. Following these findings, Shortland was rewarded with a promotion. Despite being labelled "The Dartmoor Massacre", the British government paid compensation to the American families of those killed and pensioned the disabled.

A memorial has been erected to the 271 prisoners of war (mostly seamen) who are buried in the prison grounds. By July 1815 at least 270 Americans and 1,200 French prisoners had died.

=== 1815 closure, and reopening ===
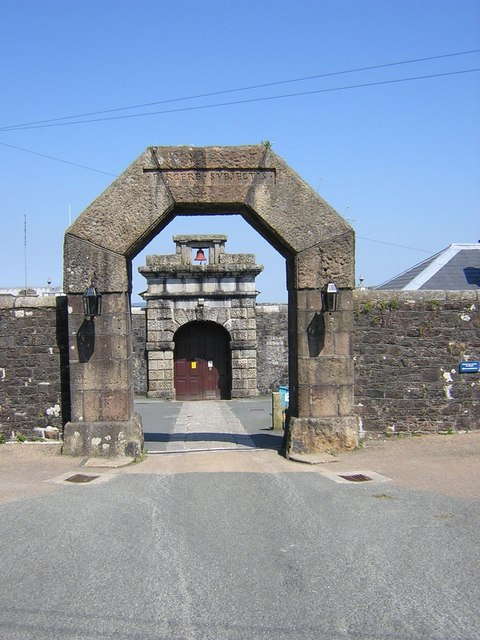
The main gates of Dartmoor Prison host the inscription Parcere Subiectis (Trans: Spare the Vanquished) from Virgil's Aeneid.

After all American and French prisoners had been released, and repatriated, the gaol on Dartmoor was left unused for 35 years until 1850. Work then began to rebuild and recommission the prison for civilian convicts. It reopened in 1851. The POW remains that had been originally buried on the moor were exhumed and re-interred in two cemeteries behind the prison when the prison farm was established in about 1852. During the First World War in 1917, criminals were removed from the gaol when it was converted into a Home Office Work Centre for conscientious objectors granted release from other prisons. The cells were left unlocked, inmates wore their own clothes and could go outside to visit the village in their off-duty time.

=== Notoriety ===
In 1920, the prison began housing UK criminals. It would develop a reputation for housing some of Britain's most serious offenders that included murderers, gangsters, thieves, spies, and robbers such as Jack “the Hat” McVitie, Jack “Spot” Comer, John George Haigh, and Frank Mitchell. Prisoners made numerous attempts to get out of the prison and onto the moors, leading to massive manhunts by the police and prison service. Instances of disobedience included a model prisoner attacking a popular guard with a razor blade and rough treatment by prisoners of a prisoner being removed to solitary.

Mutiny

The prison's tough conditions eventually led to its worst outbreak of violence on 24 January 1932. The cause of the riots is generally attributed to prisoners' perceptions of poor quality of the food, not generally but on specific days prior to the disturbance when it was suspected it had been tampered with. At the parade later that day, 50 prisoners refused orders, and the rest were marched back to their cells but refused to enter. At this point, the prison governor and his staff fled to an unused part of the prison and secured themselves there. The prisoners then released those held in solitary. There was extensive damage to property, and a prisoner was shot by one of the staff, but no prison staff were injured. According to the du Parcq report into the riot: "Reinforcements arrived, and within fifteen minutes these 'vicious brutes', who for some two hours had terrorized well-armed prison staff, and effectively controlled the prison, had surrendered and been locked up again".

Notable prisoners

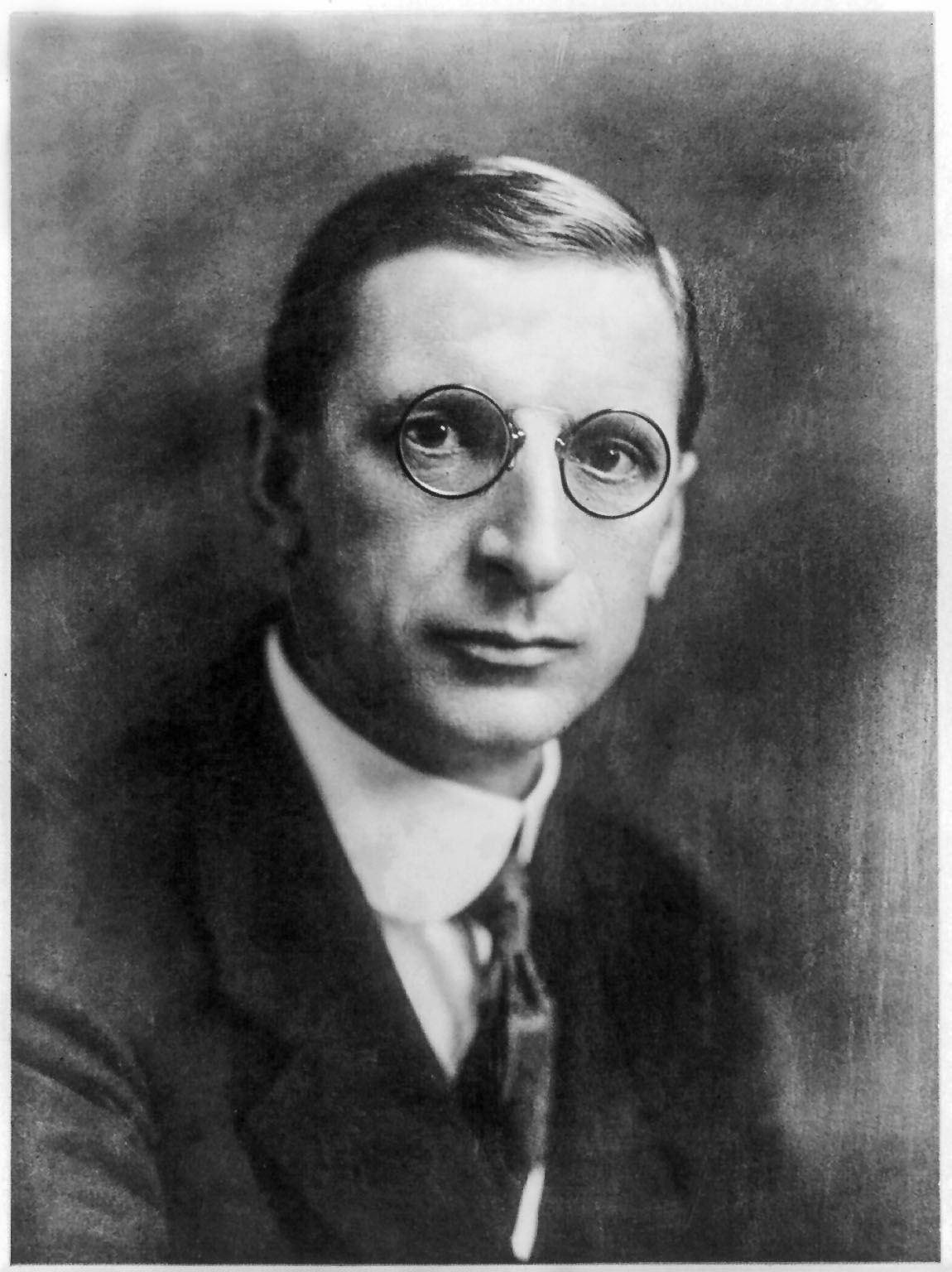
Éamon de Valera was imprisoned at Dartmoor in 1919.

- Michael Davitt
- Peter Hammond, founder of Hammond, Louisiana, US
- Fred Longden
- John Rodker
- Moondyne Joe
- Thomas William Jones, Baron Maelor
- John Boyle O'Reilly
- Arthur Owens
- Éamon de Valera
- F. Digby Hardy
- John Williams
- Frank Mitchell
- Reginald Horace Blyth
- Darkie Hutton
- John George Haigh
- Bruno Tolentino, who eventually was deported to Brazil where the major part of his oeuvre was published. "A Balada do Cárcere" (1996) is a poetic recollection of the time spent in Dartmoor.
- Fahad Mihyi, Popular Front for the Liberation of Palestine terrorist behind the 1978 London bus attack
- Aravindan Balakrishnan

== Modern operations ==
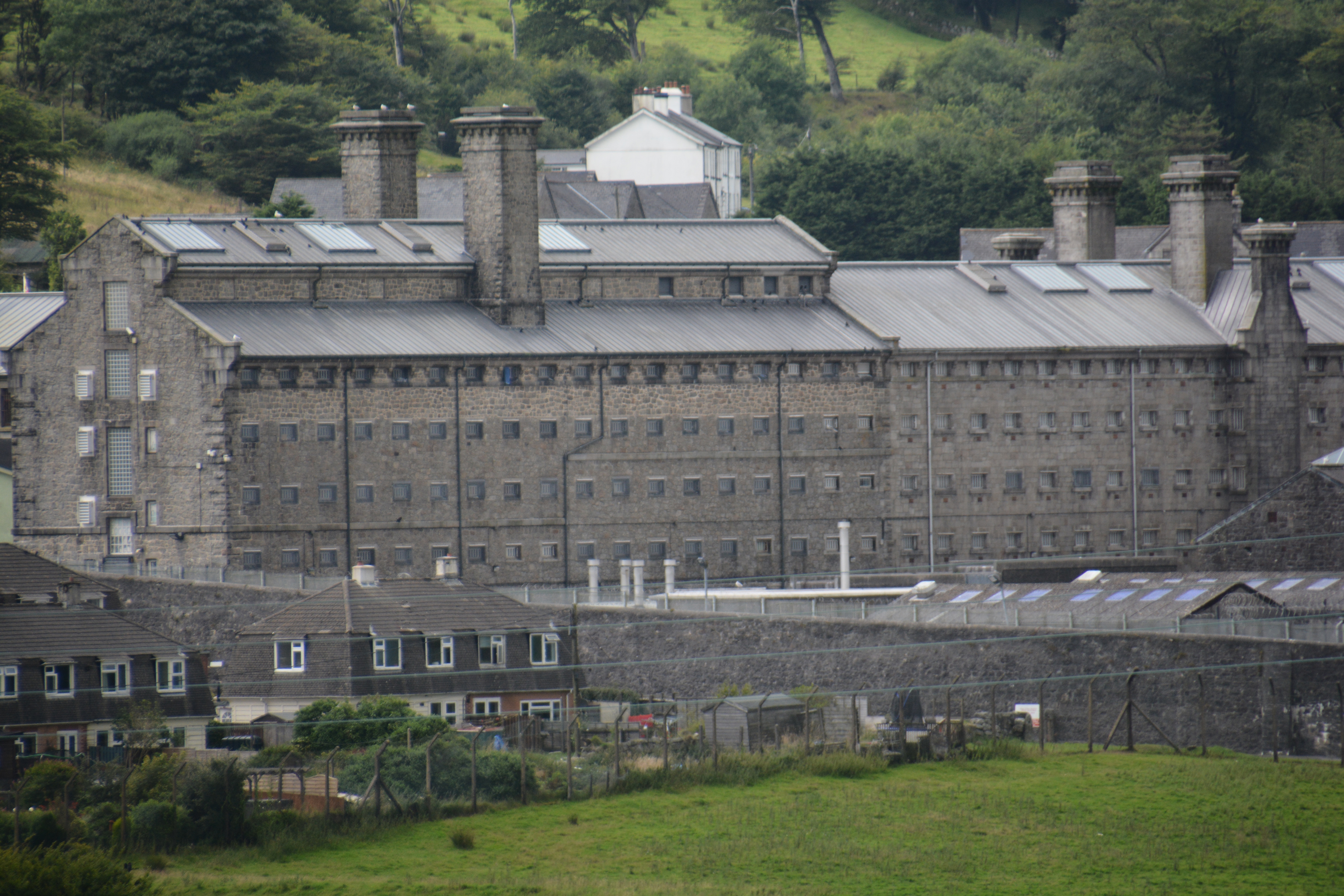
Dartmoor prison c. 2017

Dartmoor continues to suffer from its age. In 2001 a Board of Visitors report condemned sanitation, as well as highlighting a list of urgent repairs needed. A year later, the prison was converted to a Category C prison for less violent offenders. In 2002, the Prison Reform Trust warned that the prison might be breaching the Human Rights Act 1998 due to severe overcrowding. A year later, however, the Chief Inspector of Prisons declared that the prison had made substantial improvements to its management and regime.

In March 2008, staff at the prison passed a vote of no confidence in the governor Serena Watts, claiming they felt bullied by managers and unsafe.

Dartmoor is now a Category C prison, which means it houses mainly non-violent offenders and white-collar criminals. It also holds people with convictions for sexual offences, but it is designated as a support site only for these individuals, and as such does not offer treatment programmes for them.

Dartmoor operates cell accommodation on six wings. Education is available at the prison (full and part-time), and ranges from basic educational skills to Open University courses. Vocational training includes electronics, brickwork and carpentry courses up to City & Guilds and NVQ level, Painting and Decorating courses, industrial cleaning and desktop publishing. Full-time employment is also available in catering, farming, gardening, laundry, Braille, contract services, furniture manufacturing and polishing. Employment is supported with NVQ or City & Guilds vocational qualifications. All courses and qualifications at Dartmoor are operated by South Gloucestershire and Stroud College and Cornwall College.

The "Dartmoor Jailbreak" is a yearly event, in which members of the public "escape" from the prison and must travel as far as possible in four days, without directly paying for transport. By doing so they raise money for charity.

In September 2013, it was announced that discussions would commence with the Duchy of Cornwall about the long-term future of HMP Dartmoor. In January 2014 it was stated on the BBC news website that the notice period with the Duchy for closing is 10 years. In November 2015 the Ministry of Justice confirmed that, as part of a major programme to replace older prisons, it would not renew its lease on the prison.

It was announced in October 2019 that HMP Dartmoor would close in 2023, but in December 2021 it was confirmed that, following negotiations with the Duchy, it would remain open beyond 2023 and for the foreseeable future.

The Duchy of Cornwall's 25-year lease of the prison to the Ministry of Justice, signed in 2022 when the then-Prince Charles was Duke of Cornwall and taking effect in 2023, was valued at £37 million. After Prince William became Duke of Cornwall, the lease provided him with £1.5 million in annual payments. The lease was brought to wider attention in 2024. On 25 June 2026, William stopped receiving the payments and instead directed the funds towards community development rather than continuing to derive income from an unused prison.

=== Radon ===
The region, and the prison, is contaminated by hazardous radon gas generated by the decay of uranium in the region's bedrock, and prison walls. In 2023, 96 inmates of the prison were evacuated due to this. According to one source no inmates or staff are said to have suffered adverse health effects from radon poisoning at HMP Dartmoor, although this is disputed.

In 2024, Dartmoor's 682 prisoners were transferred to other prisons due to the unsafe levels of radon, and the prison closed for radon mitigation. While the closure was stated to be "temporary" (although no planned reopening date was announced), Princetown villagers expressed doubt that the jail would ever reopen because of the complications of rehabilitating such an old building, although a new 25-year lease of the prison from the Duchy of Cornwall had been entered into in 2023 which was criticised in a report by the Public Accounts Committee. Radon concentrations of 14 times the permissible limit have been recorded in the prison, and in 2025 about 500 inmates and staff, many of whom attributed serious health problems including cancers to radon, were planning to sue the Ministry of Justice.

== Dartmoor Prison Museum ==
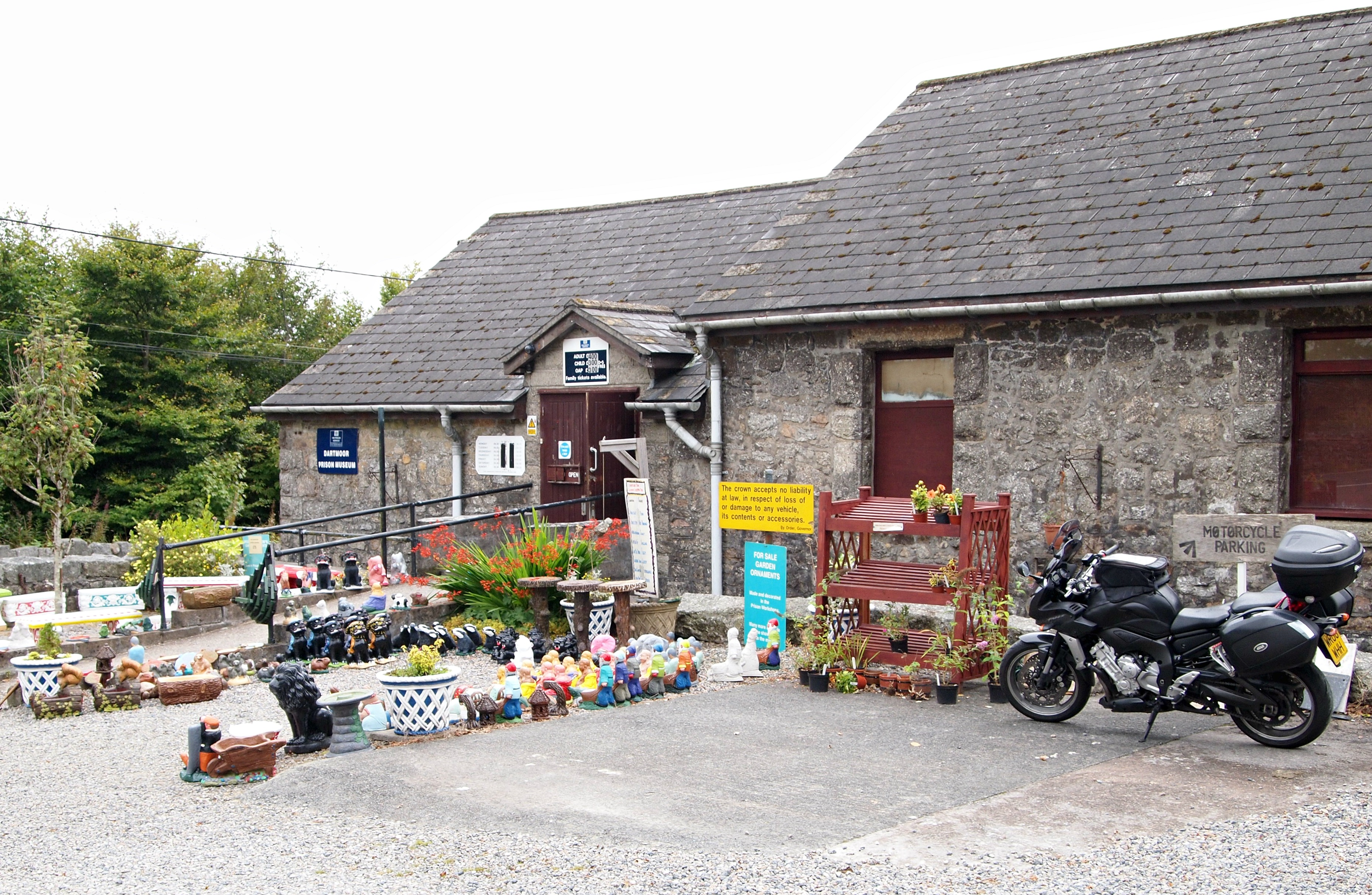
The Dartmoor Prison Museum

The Dartmoor Prison Museum, which focuses on the history of HMP Dartmoor, is located in the old dairy buildings; exhibits include the prison's role in housing prisoners of war from the Napoleonic Wars and the War of 1812, manacles and weapons, memorabilia, clothing and uniforms, famous prisoners, and the changed focus of the prison. It sold garden ornaments and other items made in the prison concrete and carpentry shops by prisoners engaged in educational courses.

There are also displays and information on less well known aspects of the prison, such as the incarceration of conscientious objectors during World War One.

The museum remained open during the closure of the prison for radon mitigation from 2024.
