= Boyle Street, London =

Street in London

Coordinates: 51.5116°N 0.1414°W

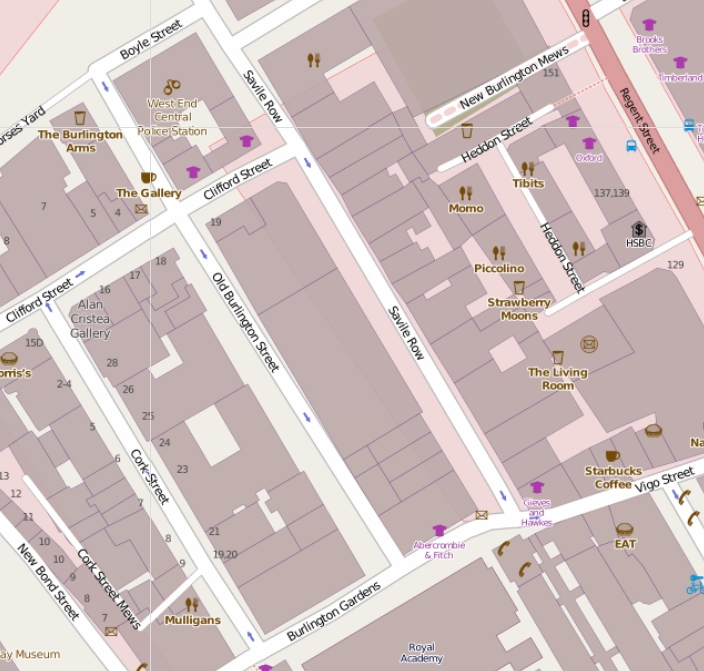
The position of Boyle Street in London

Boyle Street is a short street in central London that is named after the Boyles, the Earls of Burlington, and is on land that was once part of the Burlington Estate.

The street runs east–west from the junction of the Coach and Horses Yard and Old Burlington Street, to Savile Row. On its north side is an office block and on the south side is the West End Central Police Station.

== History ==
Although all offices today, the street once had houses and other buildings.

The Burlington Charity Schoolhouse was built in the street in about 1720, for a girls school founded in 1699 (the Burlington School for Girls).

Lord Sidney Beauclerk, son of the Duke of St. Albans and father of Topham Beauclerk, lived at number 1.

John Trusler, eccentric divine, lived at number 2 from 1764 to 1765. Elias Prestage, auctioneer who had auction rooms in Savile Row, was at number 1 in 1778. William Haines, engraver and painter, had his studio at No. 1, 1816–30.

The Boyle Street entrance to 25 Savile Row featured in the 1970s spy series The Sandbaggers as the fictional headquarters of the Secret Intelligence Service (SIS/MI6) .
