= Paedophile Unit =

English Metropolitan Police Service's Child Abuse Investigation Command

The Paedophile Unit is a branch of the Metropolitan Police Service's Child Abuse Investigation Command, based at Scotland Yard in London, England. It operates against the manufacture and distribution of child pornography, online child grooming, and "predatory paedophiles online", and organised crime associated with these.

The unit was the subject of a series of BBC television programmes concerning the Hunt for Britain's Paedophiles, which were the subject of a record 23,000 calls to the BBC Audience Line. It was responsible for the final break-up of the advocacy group called the Paedophile Information Exchange.

The Paedophile Unit works in conjunction with the Hi-Tech Crime Unit to examine computers used by suspected offenders, including computers used in public areas or via remote connections. This use of technology to identify and arrest suspects is referred to as "proactive policing".

== History ==
The Paedophile Unit began life in the early 1960s as the Obscene Publications and Public Morals Branch, although the name was shortened in 1990 to the Obscene Publications Branch (OPB). Its common name, however, even among the police hierarchy, was always the Obscene Publications Squad (OPS), and it was often colloquially known as the "porn squad" or the "dirty squad". Set up as part of the Clubs and Vice Unit following the passing of the Obscene Publications Act 1959, it originally operated against all pornography, but after restrictions on adult hardcore pornography began to be effectively rendered unenforceable by the advent of the internet, the unit was restructured in 1995 to focus solely on child sex offences and renamed the Paedophile and Child Pornography Unit. Responsibility for any future investigation of adult pornography was transferred directly to the No. 1 Area Clubs and Vice Unit at Charing Cross Police Station.

Originally part of the Criminal Investigation Department, it was transferred to the uniformed branch in November 1972 after it was revealed that some of its officers were taking bribes from the pornography industry. Several were later jailed for corruption offences. Although staffed by "uniformed" officers (although they continued to usually operate in plain clothes) and not detectives, it initially continued to be part of the Serious Crime Squad of C1 Department of CID, although by 1990 it was part of Territorial Operations (as TO13). In 1993, it returned to CID control, allowing its officers to once again use the "detective" prefix in front of their ranks, and became part of SO1(4), the International and Organised Crime Branch of Specialist Operations. In the reorganisation of 1995, it became part of the Organised Crime Group. The officer in charge was a chief inspector until 1972 and a superintendent thereafter, assisted by an inspector and a number of sergeants and constables. By 1993, it had sixteen police officers and ten civilian staff (responsible for administration, storing evidence, and, along with the officers, viewing and assessing material).

=== Paedophile Information Exchange list ===
The Obscene Publications Unit had a secret list of 316 Paedophile Information Exchange members, mostly men and most in the UK but with some in western Europe, Australia and the US, possibly seized in a police raid in the late 1970s. The list was given to the BBC, which investigated further, in 2024, by a former social worker who had himself received it from a former police officer in 1998. The social worker had over 30 years unsuccessfully pushed police, a Labour MP and a Conservative government minister to look at PIE members linked to social services and special schools.

The BBC found further information about 45% of the people on the list: half had later been convicted, cautioned, or charged but died before trial for sexual offences against children including distributing abuse images, kidnap and rape. About 70 on the list had later been in work likely to bring them into contact with minors. Half of the 70 had been teachers; others included social workers, sports coaches, youth workers, doctors, clergy, lay preachers and military officers involved in youth activities. A small number of men on the list were found to possibly still be in contact with children professionally in 2024, with no criminal convictions the BBC could find.

== Controversy ==
In 1995, newsreader Julia Somerville and her partner were arrested by the unit after nude pictures of Somerville's young daughter in the bath were taken to Boots to be developed and printed. They were later released without charge as no crime had been committed.
