= 1978 London bus attack =

Terrorist attack by the PFLP

- Location: 51°30′45″N 0°9′4″W; Europa Hotel, Grosvenor Square, London
- Date: 20 August 1978; 48 years ago 13:30 pm
- Attack type: Mass shooting, grenade attacks
- Weapons: Submachine guns, hand grenades
- Deaths: 1 civilian (+1 attacker)
- Injuries: 9 civilians
- Perpetrator: Popular Front for the Liberation of Palestine

On 20 August 1978, a staff bus, of El Al airlines in London, England was attacked by Palestinian militants. Flight attendant Irit Gidron and one militant were killed in the attack, and nine people were wounded.

== Attack ==
At around 13:30, a minibus with staff of El Al airlines was attacked during a stopover at the Europa Hotel in Grosvenor Square, Mayfair, central London, when two or three men opened fire with submachine guns and hand grenades. An El Al flight attendant was killed in the attack, while members of a wedding party were among those wounded by gun shots and a taxi driver was blown from his cab by a grenade. A man presumed to be one of the militants was found dead after the attack. A second militant was captured by the police, while a possible third escaped.

== Aftermath ==
The Popular Front for the Liberation of Palestine (PFLP) claimed responsibility for the attack. The flight attendant killed in the attack, Irit Gidron, 29, was buried in Israel next to the victims of the 1972 Munich Olympics massacre. The terrorist arrested, Fahad Mihyi, was sentenced to life imprisonment a year later for the attack.

In 2000, Yulie Cohen Gerstel, one of the flight attendants injured in the attack, contacted Mihyi who was imprisoned at Dartmoor Prison. Mihyi was apologetic for his role in the terrorist attack. Gerstel advocated for his parole as shown in the 2002 documentary My Terrorist. Mihyi was released in 2005.
