= Darkie Ellis =

British professional boxer, from 1929 to 1940

Personal information
- Born: Cyril Hills; 15 December 1914 Belper, Derbyshire, England
- Died: 14 December 1946 (aged 31)

Boxing career

Boxing record
- Total fights: 91

Darkie Ellis (born Cyril Hills; 15 December 1914 – 14 December 1946) was a British professional boxer, from 1931 to 1940. He was the son of William Hills and Elizabeth Farnsworth. His birth was registered in the December quarter of 1914.

He was at various times a welterweight; middleweight and light-heavyweight, and fought in 91 professional bouts. He was promoted as "middleweight champion of England". He represented England at a tournament in Antwerp, Belgium on 21 March 1939.

He served in the military in the Second World War.

Ellis, who was black, married a white woman from Bridlington, East Riding of Yorkshire, Joyce, and retired there. They had two daughters. He died in his early thirties. His wife later remarried.

A collection of Ellis memorabilia, owned by his granddaughter, was shown on the BBC programme Antiques Roadshow in December 2008.
