= Bill Moody (detective) =

Detectives in the Metropolitan Police in London

Bill Moody was a detective chief superintendent in the Metropolitan Police in London during the early 1970s. He was the head of the Obscene Publications Squad. He was tried for corruption in 1977, convicted and sentenced to twelve years' imprisonment.
