= Visa requirements for British citizens =

Visa requirements for British citizens are administrative entry restrictions by the authorities of other states placed on citizens of the United Kingdom.

As of 2026, British citizens have visa-free or visa on arrival access to 184 countries and territories, ranking the British passport 6th in the world according to the Henley Passport Index.

The United Kingdom left the European Union on 31 January 2020, and British citizens consequently lost their freedom of movement to EU countries; however, under the Common Travel Area, British citizens continue to have freedom of movement to Ireland.

Visa requirements for other classes of British nationals such as British nationals (overseas), British overseas citizens, British overseas territories citizens, British protected persons or British subjects are different.

== History ==
Visa requirements for British citizens were lifted by many European nations in the few years after World War II. The first changes occurred in 1947. These were removed by France on 1 January 1947.

This was then quickly followed by Belgium on 15 February 1947, Luxembourg 15 February 1947, Norway on 1 March 1947, Denmark on 22 March 1947, Sweden on 1 April 1947, Netherlands on 15 April 1947, Switzerland on 24 June 1947 Liechtenstein on 24 June 1947 and Iceland on 1 July 1947.

The requirement was lifted by Italy on 1 January 1948, Monaco (8 November 1948), Austria (15 May 1955), Paraguay (27 November 1966), United States (1 July 1988), Poland (1 July 1992), Bulgaria (March 1997), Romania (1 January 2001), Serbia and Montenegro (31 May 2003), Ukraine (1 May 2005), Georgia (1 June 2006), Moldova (1 January 2007), Kyrgyzstan (27 July 2012), Armenia (10 January 2013), Kazakhstan (15 July 2014), Indonesia (13 June 2015), Vietnam (1 July 2015) Belarus (12 February 2017), Cape Verde (1 January 2019), Uzbekistan (1 February 2019), Turkey (2 March 2020) and Oman (December 2020).

Electronic visas for British citizens were introduced: India (15 August 2015), Djibouti (18 February 2018), Malawi (October 2019) and Mongolia (November 2021). In April 2021, India announced that it would stop issuing electronic visas for British citizens from August 2021, however this was reinstated in December 2022.

Honduras cancelled a visa-free regime for British citizens as a reciprocal measure in August 2024. Similarly, Namibia will introduce visas for British citizens for reciprocity reasons, starting April 2025. However, Honduras has lifted the visa requirements in 31 October 2026.

== Visa requirements map ==
Visa requirements for British citizens holding ordinary passports British Islands (United Kingdom, Isle of Man, Guernsey, Jersey)- Right of Abode Ireland (Common Travel Area) - Freedom of movement Visa not required / ETA (Note: ETA required for Australia, Canada if arriving by air, Israel, Kenya, Mozambique, New Zealand, Saint Kitts and Nevis, Saudi Arabia, Seychelles, Sri Lanka and the United States) (Note: Including Australian eVisitor.) Visa on arrival eVisa Visa available both on arrival or online Visa required

=== Visa requirements ===
The tables below document the visa requirements for UK citizens:

Country / Region	Visa requirement	Allowed stay	Notes (excluding departure fees)
Afghanistan	eVisa	30 days	e-Visa : Visitors must arrive at Kabul International (KBL).; Due to safety concerns, the UK Government advises its citizens to avoid travelling to Afghanistan.
Albania	Visa not required	90 days	
Algeria	Visa required		Persons may be denied entry if entering with a passport containing visas or stamps issued by Israel.; Visitors on tours organized to some southern regions by an approved travel agency may obtain a visa on arrival for up to 30 days.
Andorra	Visa not required		
Angola	Visa not required	30 days	30 days per trip, but no more than 90 days within any 1 calendar year for tourism purposes only.; Visitors must have a return/onward ticket and a hotel reservation confirmation.; An International Certificate of Vaccination is required.
Antigua and Barbuda	Visa not required	6 months	
Argentina	Visa not required	90 days	
Armenia	Visa not required	180 days	Visa upon arrival for a maximum term of 180 days in a year.
Australia	eVisitor	90 days	If granted, eVisitor allows British citizens to stay in Australia for 90 days per visit. Multiple entry allowed during the eVisitor visa 12 months period.; Issued free of charge and valid for 1 year.; According to HPI (Henley Passport Index) methodology pre-departure government approval, like eVisitor manual processing is not considered as visa free.
Austria	Visa not required	90 days	90 days within any 180-day period in the Schengen Area.
Azerbaijan	eVisa	30 days	
Bahamas	Visa not required	8 months	Extendable up to 8 months.
Bahrain	eVisa / Visa on arrival	14 days	Visas can be issued on arrival for a stay up to 3 months.
Bangladesh	Visa on arrival	30 days	Visa on arrival available at Hazrat Shahjalal International Airport
Barbados	Visa not required	6 months	
Belarus	Visa not required	30 days	Visa free until 31st December 2026.; Due to safety concerns, the UK Government advises its citizens to avoid travelling to Belarus.
Belgium	Visa not required	90 days	90 days within any 180-day period in the Schengen Area.
Belize	Visa not required		
Benin	eVisa	30 days	Must have an international vaccination certificate.; Three types of electronic visa are offered: the e-Visa valid for 30 days for a single entry (50 EUR), the e-Visa valid for 30 days for several (multiple) entries (75 EUR), and the e-Visa valid for 90 days to make several (multiple) entries (100 EUR).
Bhutan	eVisa	90 days	The Sustainable Development Fee (SDF) of 200 USD per person, per night for almost all visitors to Bhutan. Additionally, if payment is made in US dollars from September 1, 2023 to August 31, 2027, the SDF is 100 USD.
Bolivia	Visa not required	90 days	As of 2025, travellers may be given an initial 30 days stamp (on arrival) and can extend it for another 60 days.; The Department of Immigration has imposed an annual limit for tourists of 90 days without a visa. For longer periods advice must be sought before travelling from the Bolivian Embassy in London.
Bosnia and Herzegovina	Visa not required	90 days	90 days within any 6-month period.
Botswana	Visa not required	90 days	
Brazil	Visa not required	90 days	As of 2025, UK passport holders are exempt from VIVIS as long as their stay does not exceed 90 days per year (counted from the date of first entry, multiple entries permitted).; Extension of stay: the stay may be extended for up to the same amount of time granted upon first entry (i.e. up to 90, 60 or 30 days).
Brunei	Visa not required	90 days	
Bulgaria	Visa not required	90 days	90 days within any 180-day period in the Schengen Area.
Burkina Faso	eVisa		
Burundi	Online Visa / Visa on arrival	1 month	From December 2021, passengers of all countries that required visa, can now obtain visa on arrival at Bujumbura International Airport, and all land borders.
Cambodia	eVisa / Visa on arrival	30 days	Extendable for another 30 days.
Cameroon	eVisa		Pre-approved visa can be picked up on arrival.
Canada	Electronic Travel Authorization	6 months	Electronic Travel Authorization required if arriving by air.
Cape Verde	Visa not required	30 days	Must register online at least five days prior to arrival.; Visitors must pay the Airport Security Fee (TSA) before visiting. The cost is 3,400 CVE (approx. 31 EUR) and can be paid via the online platform (EASE).
Central African Republic	Visa required		Due to security concerns, the UK Government advises its citizens to avoid travelling to Central African Republic.
Chad	eVisa		
Chile	Visa not required	90 days	May be extended.
China	Visa not required	30 days	30-day visa-free stay if arriving by December 31, 2026.; 30-day visa-free stay in Hainan Island, if arriving on the island directly from outside Mainland China such as Hong Kong, Macau, Taiwan, or any country with direct flights to the island.; 240-hour (10-day) visa-free transit to a third country or region (including Hong Kong, Macau or Taiwan) using any mode of transport. Must have a confirmed onward ticket/itinerary, and enter through 1 of 64 approved ports.; During which, may freely travel within the 24 provinces permitted for visa-free transit and engage in tourism, business, and visits.; 24-hour visa-free transit to a third country or region (including Hong Kong, Macau, and Taiwan), is available at most international airports, without leaving the airport.; Travellers who need to leave the airport may obtain a temporary entry permit from immigration.; 5-day port visa (Visa on Arrival) for Shenzhen if arriving at designated ports of entry from Hong Kong by land or sea, for stays within Shenzhen.; 3-day port visa (Visa on Arrival) if arriving in Zhuhai or Xiamen at designated ports of entry, for stays within the respective city.; 15-day visa-free entry for cruise ship passengers in tour groups, if arriving at any cruise port along China's coastline, including but not limited to Tianjin; Dalian; Shanghai; Lianyungang; Wenzhou; Zhoushan; Xiamen; Qingdao; Guangzhou; Shenzhen; Beihai; Haikou; Sanya. May further travel inland to all regions of coastal provinces (and equivalents) and Beijing.; May apply for a port visa (Visa on Arrival) if travelling for an urgent, qualified reason. Prior clearance for port visa is highly recommended or may be denied boarding by airlines.; Visiting visas issued to British citizens are generally valid for 2 years.
Colombia	Visa not required	90 days	
Comoros	Visa on arrival	45 days	
Republic of the Congo	Visa required		
Democratic Republic of the Congo	eVisa	7 days	
Costa Rica	Visa not required	180 days	As of 2025, British passport holders can visit Costa Rica without a visa for up to 180 days under a tourist visa waiver. The exact period is at the discretion of the immigration officer on arrival. If they plan to work, or stay for a longer period, the visitor must consult the Costa Rican Embassy in the UK.
Côte d'Ivoire	eVisa	3 months	e-Visa holders must arrive via Port Bouet Airport.
Croatia	Visa not required	90 days	90 days within any 180 day period in the Schengen Area.
Cuba	eVisa	90 days	As of July 2025, an evisa is needed (online) for single entry 90 day period. Visa is extendable.
Cyprus	Visa not required	90 days	90 days within 180-day period.
Czech Republic	Visa not required	90 days	90 days within any 180-day period in the Schengen Area.
Denmark	Visa not required	90 days	90 days within any 180-day period in the Schengen Area.
Djibouti	eVisa	90 days	
Dominica	Visa not required	6 months	
Dominican Republic	Visa not required	30 days	Will normally be granted a 30-day stay on arrival. This can be extended up to 120 days by an extension online.
Ecuador	Visa not required	90 days	As of 2025, can enter without a visa for up to 90 days in any 12-month period.; If British passport holders are already in Ecuador and want to stay longer than 90 days, they pay to extend their stay by an extra 90 days. They must apply for an extension before the first 90-day period ends.
Egypt	eVisa / Visa on arrival	30 days	
El Salvador	Visa not required	6 months	
Equatorial Guinea	eVisa		
Eritrea	Visa required		Pre-approved visa can be picked up on arrival.
Estonia	Visa not required	90 days	90 days within any 180-day period in the Schengen Area.
Eswatini	Visa not required	30 days	
Ethiopia	eVisa / Visa on arrival	90 days	Visa on arrival is obtainable only at Addis Ababa Bole International Airport.; e-Visa holders must arrive via Addis Ababa Bole International Airport.; e-Visa is available for 30 or 90 days.
Fiji	Visa not required	4 months	
Finland	Visa not required	90 days	90 days within any 180-day period in the Schengen Area.
France	Visa not required	90 days	90 days within any 180-day period in the Schengen Area.
Gabon	eVisa	90 days	e-Visa holders must arrive via Libreville International Airport.
Gambia	Visa not required	90 days	
Georgia	Visa not required	1 year	
Germany	Visa not required	90 days	90 days within any 180-day period in the Schengen Area.
Ghana	eVisa		Pre-approved visa can be picked up on arrival.
Greece	Visa not required	90 days	90 days within any 180-day period in the Schengen Area.
Grenada	Visa not required	6 months	Beginning on 1 December 2020, all travellers to Grenada will be required to complete an online application in order to receive a Pure Safe Travel Authorization Certificate to enter Grenada.
Guatemala	Visa not required	90 days	
Guinea	eVisa	90 days	
Guinea-Bissau	Visa on arrival	90 days	
Guyana	Visa not required		
Haiti	Visa not required	90 days	Due to security concerns, the UK government advises its citizens to avoid travelling to Haiti.
Honduras	Visa not required	90 days	
Hungary	Visa not required	90 days	90 days within any 180-day period in the Schengen Area.
Iceland	Visa not required	90 days	90 days within any 180-day period in the Schengen Area.
India	eVisa	30 days	30 days, 1 year and 5 years of eTourist visa is now available from Indian eVisa. However this service is not available for British citizens of Pakistani origin (i.e. someone with at least 1 Pakistani parent or grandparent).
Indonesia	e-VOA / Visa on arrival	30 days	The (Visa on Arrival) costs 500,000 Indonesian rupiah (£25), payable in cash or by card. It is valid for single entry only. Travellers must meet passport validity requirements and have a return or onward ticket. Visas prior to arrival are available online.
Iran	Visa required		British citizens must have their visa stamped in their passport in advance of arrival in Iran.; Due to security concerns, the UK Government advises its citizens to avoid travelling to Iran.
Iraq	eVisa	30 days	British citizens are no longer able to get a visit visa on arrival in Iraq. They must apply for a visa on the e-visa portal of the Government of Iraq at least 24 hours before travel. The visa costs 160 USD and is valid for 30 days.
Ireland	Visa not required	Freedom of movement (Common Travel Area).	British citizens have many of the same rights and entitlements as Irish citizens
Israel	Electronic Travel Authorization	90 days	Entry refused to anyone who "knowingly issues a public call for boycotting Israel."
Italy	Visa not required	90 days	90 days within any 180-day period in the Schengen Area.
Jamaica	Visa not required	180 days	
Japan	Visa not required	90 days	Visitors can travel to Japan for tourism or business for up to 90 days. A visa is given on arrival; it is not necessary to apply before travel. The Japan immigration authorities may extend that visa by another 90 days at their discretion. Extensions do not happen automatically and must be applied for.
Jordan	eVisa / Visa on arrival		Visa can be obtained upon arrival, it will cost a total of 40 JOD, obtainable at most international ports of entry and land border crossings (except King Hussein/Allenby Bridge)
Kazakhstan	Visa not required	30 days	
Kenya	Electronic Travel Authorisation	90 days	Applications can be submitted up to 90 days prior to travel and must be submitted at least 3 days in advance.; eTA fee is 32.50 USD.; Proof of reservation at the hotel where visitors plan to stay is required (if staying with friends, an invitation letter is also acceptable).; Yellow fever vaccination certificate is required if coming from endemic countries.; Visitors can also be entered on an East Africa tourist visa issued by Rwanda or Uganda.
Kiribati	Visa not required	90 days	
North Korea	Visa required		
South Korea	Visa not required	90 days	K-ETA exemption until the end of 2026.; British citizens can enter South Korea as a short term visit (e.g., tours, visiting relatives or friends, attending simple meetings) up to 90 days without a visa, though they should remain aware of the quarantine requirements. An onward or return ticket is mandatory. It is illegal to work on a tourist visa, whether as a teacher or in any other capacity.; One must be in possession of a Korea Electronic Travel Authorization (K-ETA) to enter Korea visa-free, which can be completed up to 24 hours before boarding a flight, and is valid for 3 years from the date of approval. There is a small, non-refundable charge.
Kuwait	eVisa / Visa on arrival	3 months	
Kyrgyzstan	Visa not required	30 days	30 days within any 60-day period.
Laos	eVisa / Visa on arrival	30 days	
Latvia	Visa not required	90 days	90 days within any 180-day period in the Schengen Area.
Lebanon	Free visa on arrival	1 month	Extendable for 2 additional months; granted free of charge at Beirut International Airport or any other port of entry if there is no Israeli visa or seal, holding a telephone number, an address in Lebanon, and a non-refundable return or circle trip ticket.
Lesotho	Visa not required	14 days	
Liberia	eVisa		Pre-approved visa can be picked up on arrival.
Libya	eVisa	90 days	Due to security concerns, the UK Government advises its citizens to avoid travelling to Libya.; Independent travel is not permitted, and visitors must organize their visit through a tour guide. A tourist police escort is required at all times.; An eVisa will not be granted without a sponsor or tour agency.; A security letter issued by the Libyan Immigration Authorities may also be required.; Holders of passports containing an Israeli stamp or visa will be refused entry in Libya.
Liechtenstein	Visa not required	90 days	90 days within any 180-day period in the Schengen Area.
Lithuania	Visa not required	90 days	90 days within any 180-day period in the Schengen Area.
Luxembourg	Visa not required	90 days	90 days within any 180-day period in the Schengen Area.
Madagascar	eVisa / Visa on arrival	90 days	For stays of 61 to 90 days, the visa fee is 59 USD.
Malawi	eVisa / Visa on arrival	90 days	
Malaysia	Visa not required	3 months	
Maldives	Free visa on arrival	30 days	
Mali	Visa required		Due to safety concerns, the UK Government advises its citizens to avoid travelling to Mali.
Malta	Visa not required	90 days	90 days within any 180-day period in the Schengen Area.
Marshall Islands	Visa not required	90 days	90 days within any 180-day period.
Mauritania	eVisa	30 days	Available at Nouakchott–Oumtounsy International Airport.
Mauritius	Visa not required	90 days	
Mexico	Visa not required	180 days	Visa stamp (up to 180 days) length determined on arrival.
Micronesia	Visa not required	30 days	
Moldova	Visa not required	90 days	90 days within any 180-day period.
Monaco	Visa not required		
Mongolia	Visa not required	30 days	The Ministry of Foreign Affairs of Mongolia has exempted visas for 34 countries from January 2023 to December 2026.
Montenegro	Visa not required	90 days	Must register with the local police station (either through a tourist organization or at hotel reception) within 24 hours of arrival.
Morocco	Visa not required	90 days	For periods of longer than 90 days, a resident permit is required and can be issued by the Police Department in place of residence in Morocco.
Mozambique	ETA / Visa not required	30 days	Visitors must register their ETA on the e-Visa platform at least 48 hours before travel and pay a processing fee of 48 USD.
Myanmar	eVisa	28 days	e-Visa holders must arrive via Yangon, Nay Pyi Taw or Mandalay airports or via land border crossings with Thailand — Tachileik, Myawaddy and Kawthaung or India — Rih Khaw Dar and Tamu.; e-Visa available for both tourism (allowed stay is 28 days) or business purposes (allowed stay is 70 days).
Namibia	eVisa / Visa on arrival	3 months / 90 days	Can be obtained online or on arrival for a fee of N$1,600 (approximately €82 / US$88).
Nauru	Visa required		In addition of a visa, an application should be obtained by email via the Directorate of Immigration.
Nepal	Online Visa / Visa on arrival	90 days	
Netherlands	Visa not required	90 days	90 days within any 180-day period in the Schengen Area.
New Zealand	Electronic Travel Authority	6 months	May enter using eGate.; International Visitor Conservation and Tourism Levy must be paid upon requesting an Electronic Travel Authority.; Holders of an Australian Permanent Resident Visa or Resident Return Visa may be granted a New Zealand Resident Visa on arrival permitting indefinite stay (pursuant to the Trans-Tasman Travel Arrangement), subject to meeting character requirements and obtaining an Electronic Travel Authority prior to departure. Such travellers are not required to pay the International Visitor Conservation and Tourism Levy.
Nicaragua	Visa not required	90 days	
Niger	Visa required		Due to security concerns, the UK Government advises its citizens to avoid travelling to Niger.
Nigeria	eVisa	30 days	Pre-approved visa can be picked up on arrival.
North Macedonia	Visa not required	90 days	
Norway	Visa not required	90 days	90 days within any 180-day period in the Schengen Area.
Oman	Visa not required / eVisa	14 days / 30 days	
Pakistan	eVisa	3 months	
Palau	Free visa on arrival	30 days	
Panama	Visa not required	90 days	As of 2024, British nationals entering Panama now have a 90 day (3 month) tourist visa stamped in their passport to mark entry to Panama. Extensions are not normally allowed unless an application is made to change immigration status within the 90 days (business, marriage).; maximum amount of time that British passport holders can stay in Panama as a tourist is three (3) months. If they want to stay longer than three months, they may extend their stay by applying for an extension through the Offices of Immigration in Panama. (Panama embassy U.K.); British nationals don't need a visa to visit Panama except if arriving by sea.
Papua New Guinea	eVisa / Visa on arrival	60 days	Visa on arrival is only available at Port Moresby Airport.; e-Visa is available at Gurney Airport (Alotau), Mount Hagen Airport, Port Moresby Airport and Tokua Airport (Rabaul).
Paraguay	Visa not required	90 days	British passport holders do not need a visa to visit Paraguay. Normally permission to stay for 90 days on arrival. Staying for another 90 days, check with the Paraguayan Immigration Department (in Spanish).
Peru	Visa not required	183 days	Visa stamp (up to 183 accumulated days within a 365 day period) length determined on arrival.
Philippines	Visa not required	30 days	A tourist visa is available from the Philippine Embassy before travelling, which will allow an initial total of 59-day stay.; For longer periods, a visa extension is available once inside the country from the Bureau of immigration.
Poland	Visa not required	90 days	90 days within any 180-day period in the Schengen Area.
Portugal	Visa not required	90 days	90 days within any 180-day period in the Schengen Area.
Qatar	Visa not required	30 days	
Romania	Visa not required	90 days	90 days within any 180-day period in the Schengen Area.
Russia	Visa required		Due to security concerns, the UK Government advises its citizens to avoid travelling to Russia.
Rwanda	Visa not required	30 days	Can also be entered on an East Africa Tourist Visa issued by Kenya or Uganda.
Saint Kitts and Nevis	Electronic Travel Authorisation	6 months	
Saint Lucia	Visa not required	6 weeks	
Saint Vincent and the Grenadines	Visa not required	6 months	
Samoa	Entry permit on arrival	90 days	
San Marino	Visa not required		
São Tomé and Príncipe	Visa not required	15 days	
Saudi Arabia	Electronic Travel Authorization	6 months	e-Visa / Visa on arrival can also be obtained.
Senegal	Visa not required	90 days	
Serbia	Visa not required	90 days	
Seychelles	Electronic Border System	3 months	Application can be submitted up to 30 days before travel.; Visitors must upload a reservation confirmation(s) for each visitor's location of stay in Seychelles.; Yellow fever vaccination certificate is required if coming from endemic countries.; Payment of the fee (EUR 10) by credit or debit card.; Valid for one journey only and it expires once exit the country.
Sierra Leone	eVisa / Visa on arrival	3 months / 30 days	
Singapore	Visa not required	90 days	
Slovakia	Visa not required	90 days	90 days within any 180-day period in the Schengen Area.
Slovenia	Visa not required	90 days	90 days within any 180-day period in the Schengen Area.
Solomon Islands	Free Visitor's permit on arrival	3 months	
Somalia	eVisa	30 days	All visitors must have an approved Electronic Visa (eTAS) before the start of their journey.
South Africa	Visa not required	90 days	
South Sudan	eVisa		Obtainable online 30 days single entry for 100 USD, 90 days multiple entry for 200 USD and 180 days multiple entry for 350 USD.; Printed visa authorization must be presented at the time of travel.; Due to security concerns, the UK government advises its citizens to avoid travelling to South Sudan.
Spain	Visa not required	90 days	90 days within any 180-day period in the Schengen Area.
Sri Lanka	ETA	30 days	Sri Lanka introduced an ETA valid for 30 days.
Sudan	Visa required		The UK government advises against all travel to Sudan due to the ongoing military conflict in Khartoum and other parts of the country, widespread violent crime, and a high threat of terrorism, kidnapping, enforced disappearances, and unlawful arrest. Khartoum International Airport is closed. While Port Sudan Airport is the only civilian airport operating international flights, it is subject to drone attacks and at high risk of intermittent closure. The British Embassy in Khartoum is closed, and consular support in Sudan is severely limited, with no in-person assistance available. The UK government is no longer evacuating people from Sudan, and any attempts to leave the country are at the individual's own risk.
Suriname	Visa not required	90 days	An entrance fee of USD 50 or EUR 50 must be paid online prior to arrival.; Multiple entry e-Visa is also available.
Sweden	Visa not required	90 days	90 days within any 180-day period in the Schengen Area.
Switzerland	Visa not required		UK citizens do not require an entry visa for Switzerland for either short stays or for long stays (over 90 days).
Syria	eVisa / Visa on arrival	30 days	Due to security concerns, the UK Government advises its citizens to avoid travelling to Syria.
Tajikistan	eVisa	60 days	
Tanzania	eVisa / Visa on arrival	90 days	
Thailand	Visa not required	30 days	If not arriving by air, British citizens are only permitted two visits per year.
Timor-Leste	Visa on arrival	30 days	Visa on arrival is only available at the Presidente Nicolau Lobato International Airport or at the Dili Sea Port.
Togo	eVisa	15 days	
Tonga	Free visa on arrival	31 days	
Trinidad and Tobago	Visa not required		
Tunisia	Visa not required	3 months	
Turkey	Visa not required	3 months	90 days within any 180-day period.
Turkmenistan	Visa required		10-day visa on arrival if holding a letter of invitation provided by a company registered in Turkmenistan with a prior approval from the Foreign Ministry. Visitors can apply to extend their stay for an additional 10 days.; When transiting between two non-bordering countries, visitors can obtain a Turkmenistan transit visa for a five-day stay. This must be applied for in advance at the Turkmenistan Embassy. Visitors must also submit copies of the visas for the country of entry into Turkmenistan and the country of departure from Turkmenistan. Visa fee is 20 USD.
Tuvalu	Free Visa on arrival	1 month	
Uganda	eVisa	3 months	Can also be entered on an East Africa tourist visa issued by Kenya or Rwanda.
Ukraine	Visa not required	90 days	Due to ongoing Russian invasion of Ukraine, the UK Government advises its citizens to avoid travelling to Ukraine.
United Arab Emirates	Visa not required	90 days	Individuals wishing to stay longer may make a request with the Immigration Officer at the airport or contact the local General Directorate of Residency and Foreign Affairs at least 3 days prior to the expiry date.
United States	Visa Waiver Program	90 days	ESTA is valid for 2 years from the date of issuance.; ESTA is also required when entering the country by cruise ship or land.; A Form I-94 is required for entry into the United States by land. It carries a $30 fee and can be obtained either online or upon arrival.; Visa required for nationals of VWP countries who have travelled or been present in Iran, Iraq, Libya, North Korea, Somalia, Sudan, Syria or Yemen at any time on or after 1 March 2011 or Cuba at any time on or after 12 January 2021, or nationals of VWP countries who are also nationals of Iran, Iraq, North Korea, Sudan or Syria. Exceptions apply if the travel was in military or diplomatic service of the VWP country.
Uruguay	Visa not required	90 days	
Uzbekistan	Visa not required	30 days	
Vanuatu	Visa not required	120 days	
Vatican City	Visa not required		
Venezuela	Visa not required	90 days	Entry is visa-free on a 'tourist card', issued on arrival. A return or onward travel ticket must be shown. Extensions of up to 90 days can be arranged at any SAIME (immigration service) for a fee and must apply before one's tourist card and stamp expire.; One can only apply for or extend their (residency permit) at the main SAIME office in Caracas.
Vietnam	Visa not required	45 days	A single entry e-Visa valid for 90 days is also available.
Yemen	Visa required		Due to security concerns, the UK Government advises its citizens to avoid travelling to Yemen.; Separately, Yemen introduced an e-Visa system for visitors who meet certain eligibility requirements (group travel of 10 or more people, business trips, and transit etc.).
Zambia	Visa not required	30 days	British citizens are eligible for a universal (KAZA) visa allowing access to Zimbabwe.
Zimbabwe	eVisa / Visa on arrival	1 month	British citizens are eligible for a universal (KAZA) visa allowing access to Zambia.

==== Common Travel Area ====
The United Kingdom, together with its Crown Dependencies of Guernsey, Jersey and the Isle of Man and the Republic of Ireland make up a Common Travel Area where:

- No ID is required for travel by land for British or Irish citizens
- Only photographic ID is required for travel by air or sea for British or Irish citizens (but some airlines - such as Ryanair - may mandate passports for all)

However, there are occasionally checks on coaches and trains moving between Northern Ireland and the Republic of Ireland. British citizens living in Ireland have many of the same rights and entitlements as an Irish citizen. Citizens of third countries must have passports and, if required, visas to travel between the United Kingdom and Republic of Ireland.

British visas don't enable travel to Ireland for people without agreement with Ireland, and vice versa. Passengers travelling between the Common Travel Area and the Schengen Area are subject to systematic passport/identity checks.

People who are dual British and other citizens will need a UK passport to enter the UK, even if they reside permanently in the other country of citizenship. If they have children who are also British citizens those will also need a UK passport if they shall join the parents on a trip to the United Kingdom.

==== British Crown Dependencies and Overseas Territories ====
Visitor to	Visa requirement	Allowed stay	Notes
Akrotiri and Dhekelia	Visa not required		
Anguilla	Visa not required	3 months	British citizens with a connection to the territory have right of abode.
Bermuda	Visa not required	6 months	British citizens with a connection to the territory have right of abode.
British Antarctic Territory	Special permit required		
British Indian Ocean Territory	Special permit required		
British Virgin Islands	Visa not required	1 month	Extension of stay possible.; British citizens with a connection to the territory have right of abode.
Cayman Islands	Visa not required	6 months	British citizens with a connection to the territory have right of abode.
Falkland Islands	Visa not required	1 month	A visitor permit is normally issued as a stamp in the passport on arrival, The maximum validity period is 1 month.; Visitors who have a connection with the Falkland Islands have right of abode.
Guernsey	Visa not required	90 days	Anyone working and/or living in Guernsey requires a Permit/Certificate to do so.; In Alderney, a work or employment permit is required for persons without Guernsey (Alderney) status.
Isle of Man	Visa not required		Work or employment permit is required for persons without "Isle of Man worker" status.
Jersey	Visa not required		Work or employment permit is not required.
Gibraltar	Visa not required	90 days	90 days within any 180-day period in the Schengen Area, strictly for tourism only with no right to live and work in Gibraltar, unless they are also a Gibraltar resident.; British nationals and EEA nationals, who want to live and work in Gibraltar must apply for a resident permit, subject to age, salary level and business registration requirements.
Montserrat	Visa not required	6 months	British citizens with a connection to the territory have right of abode.
Pitcairn Islands	Visa not required	14 days	Landing fee applies.
Ascension Island	eVisa	3 months	3 months within any year period.
Saint Helena	Visa Free with Payment	183 days	The entry permit costs £25 and is issued on arrival.
Tristan da Cunha	Permission required		Permission to land required: £15 for ship and £30 for yacht passengers for Tristan da Cunha Island; £20 for Gough Island, Inaccessible Island or Nightingale Islands unless there is a connection with Tristan da Cunha, in which case right of abode.
South Georgia and the South Sandwich Islands	Permit required		Pre-arrival permit from the Commissioner required (72 hours/1 month for £110/160).
Turks and Caicos Islands	Visa not required	90 days	British citizens with a connection to the territory have right of abode.

==== Territories and disputed areas ====
Visitor to	Visa requirement	Notes (excluding departure fees)
Europe
Abkhazia	Visa required	Tourists from all countries (except Georgia) can visit Abkhazia for a period not exceeding 24 hours as part of an organized tourist group.
(Belarus) Brest and Grodno	Visa not required	Visa-free for 10 days.
Northern Cyprus	Visa not required	Visa-free access for 3 months. Passport required.
(United Nations) UN Buffer Zone in Cyprus	Access Permit required	access Permit is required for travelling inside the zone, except Civil Use Areas.
Faroe Islands	Visa not required	
Kosovo	Visa not required	90 days
Mount Athos	Special permit required	Special permit required (4 days: EUR 25 for Orthodox visitors, EUR 35 for non-Orthodox visitors, EUR 18 for students). There is a visitors' quota: maximum 100 Orthodox and 10 non-Orthodox per day and women are not allowed.
(Norway) Jan Mayen	Permit required	Permit issued by the local police required for staying for less than 24 hours and permit issued by the Norwegian police for staying for more than 24 hours.
Svalbard	Visa not required	Unlimited Stay (Indefinite Stay).
Closed cities and regions in Russia	Special authorisation required	Several closed cities require special authorisation.
South Ossetia	Visa required	To enter South Ossetia, visitors must have a multiple-entry visa for Russia and register their stay with the Migration Service of the Ministry of Internal Affairs within 3 days.
Transnistria	Visa not required	Visitors must complete and obtain a temporary migration card at the border checkpoint. The maximum period of stay is 45 days, and it can be extended multiple times through this card.
Africa
Eritrea outside Asmara	Travel permit required	Visa covers Asmara only; to travel in the rest of the country, a Travel Permit for Foreigners is required (20 Eritrean nakfa).
Mayotte	Visa not required	90 days within 180-day period; Valid ID or Passport Required.
Réunion	Visa not required	90 days within 180-day period.; Valid ID or Passport Required.
Sahrawi Arab Democratic Republic	Visa not required	Visa not required up to 3 months in the Western Sahara controlled territory.
Somaliland	Visa on arrival	Visa issued on arrival (30 days for 30 USD, payable on arrival).
Sudan outside Khartoum	Travel permit required	All foreigners travelling more than 25 kilometres outside of Khartoum must obtain a travel permit.
(Sudan) Darfur	Travel permit required	Separate travel permit is required.
Asia
(China) Hainan	Visa not required	30 days
Hong Kong	Visa not required	180 days
Protected and restricted areas of India	PAP/RAP required	Protected Area Permit (PAP) required for whole states of Nagaland and Sikkim and parts of states Manipur, Arunachal Pradesh, Uttaranchal, Jammu and Kashmir, Rajasthan, Himachal Pradesh. Restricted Area Permit (RAP) required for all of Andaman and Nicobar Islands and parts of Sikkim. Some of these requirements are occasionally lifted for a year.
Iraqi Kurdistan	eVisa	30 days; An Iraqi Kurdistan e-Visa does not grant access to the rest of Iraq.
Kazakhstan	Special permission required	Special permission required for the town of Baikonur and surrounding areas in Kyzylorda Oblast, and the town of Gvardeyskiy near Almaty.
(Iran) Kish Island	Visa not required	Tourists for Kish Island do not require a visa.
Macau	Visa not required	180 days
(Malaysia) Sabah and Sarawak	Visa not required	These states have their own immigration authorities and passport is required to travel to them, however the same visa applies.
Maldives outside Malé	Permission required	With the exception of the capital Malé, tourists are generally prohibited from visiting non-resort islands without the express permission of the Government of Maldives.
North Korea outside Pyongyang	Special permit required	People are not allowed to leave the capital city, tourists may only leave the capital with a governmental tourist guide (no independent visits)
Palestine	Visa not required	Arrival by sea to Gaza Strip not allowed.
(Saudi Arabia) Mecca and Medina	Special access required	Non-Muslims and those following the Ahmadiyya religious movement are strictly prohibited from entry.
(Tajikistan) Gorno-Badakhshan Autonomous Province	OVIR permit required	OVIR permit required (15+5 Tajikistani Somoni) and another special permit (free of charge) is required for Lake Sarez.
(China) Tibet Autonomous Region	TTP required	Tibet Travel Permit required (10 USD).
Taiwan	Visa not required	90 days
Closed cities of Turkmenistan	Special permit required	A special permit, issued prior to arrival by the Ministry of Foreign Affairs, is required if visiting the following places: Atamurat, Cheleken, Dashoguz, Serakhs and Serhetabat.
(United Nations) Korean Demilitarized Zone	Restricted zone	
(United Nations) UNDOF Zone and Ghajar	Restricted zone	
Yemen outside Sanaa or Aden	Special permission required	Special permission needed for travel outside Sanaa or Aden.
Caribbean and North Atlantic
Aruba	Visa not required	Visa not required for 30 days, extendable to 180 days.
Caribbean Netherlands	Visa not required	Visa not required up to 3 months
Curaçao	Visa not required	Visa not required for 3 months.
(France) French West Indies	Visa not required	French West Indies refers to Martinique, Guadeloupe, Saint Martin and Saint Barthélemy.
Greenland	Visa not required	90 days
(Venezuela) Margarita Island	Visa not required	All visitors are fingerprinted.
Puerto Rico	Electronic System for Travel Authorization	Visa not required under the Visa Waiver Program, for 90 days on arrival from overseas for 2 years. ESTA required.
Saint Pierre and Miquelon	Visa not required	Visa not required for 90 days.
(Colombia) San Andrés and Leticia	Tourist Card on arrival	Visitors arriving at Gustavo Rojas Pinilla International Airport and Alfredo Vásquez Cobo International Airport must buy tourist cards on arrival.
Sint Maarten	Visa not required	Visa not required for 3 months.
U.S. Virgin Islands	Electronic System for Travel Authorization	Visa not required under the Visa Waiver Program, for 90 days on arrival from overseas for 2 years. ESTA required.
Oceania
American Samoa	Electronic authorisation	30 days
(Australia) Ashmore and Cartier Islands	Special authorisation required	Special authorisation required.
Clipperton Island	Special permit required	Special permit required.
Cook Islands	Visa not required	Visa not required for 31 days.
(Fiji) Lau Province	Special permission required	Special permission required.
French Polynesia	Visa not required	90 days
Guam	Visa not required	45 days
New Caledonia	Visa not required	90 days
Niue	not required	30 days
Northern Mariana Islands	Visa not required	45 days
Tokelau	Entry Permit required	
United States Minor Outlying Islands	Special permits required	Special permits required for Baker Island, Howland Island, Jarvis Island, Johnston Atoll, Kingman Reef, Midway Atoll, Palmyra Atoll and Wake Island.
Wallis and Futuna	Visa not required	Visa not required.
South America
French Guiana	Visa not required	
Galápagos	Pre-registration required	60 days; Visitors must pre-register to receive a 20 USD Transit Control Card (TCT).
South Atlantic and Antarctica
Antarctica	Special authorisation required	Special permits required for French Southern and Antarctic Lands, Argentine Antarctica, Australia Australian Antarctic Territory, Antártica Chilena Province Chilean Antarctic Territory, Australia Heard Island and McDonald Islands, Norway Peter I Island, Norway Queen Maud Land, New Zealand Ross Dependency.

== Non-ordinary passports ==
Holders of exclusive categories of British passports have this visa-free access, to: China (diplomatic passports), Kuwait (diplomatic or official passports), Mongolia (diplomatic passports), Qatar (diplomatic or official passports and British Diplomatic Messenger or Queen's Messenger Passports) and the United Arab Emirates (diplomatic or official passports).
Holders of diplomatic or service passports of any country have visa-free access to Ethiopia, and Zimbabwe. Holders of British official and diplomatic passports require a visa for South Africa.

== Non-visa restrictions ==
=== Blank passport pages ===
Many countries require a minimum number of blank pages to be available in the passport being presented, typically one or two pages. Endorsement pages, which often appear after the visa pages, are not counted as being valid or available.

=== Vaccination ===
Cover of the new International Certificate of Vaccination issued by the Bureau of Quarantine in the Philippines since 2021

The African countries of Angola, Benin, Burkina Faso, Burundi, Cameroon, Central African Republic, Democratic Republic of the Congo, Republic of the Congo, Côte d'Ivoire, Gabon, Ghana, Guinea-Bissau, Mali, Niger, Sierra Leone and Togo, South Sudan and Uganda, along with French Guiana in South America, require all incoming passengers older than nine months to one year, to have a current International Certificate of Vaccination or Prophylaxis.

Some other countries require vaccination only if the passenger is coming from an infected area or has visited one recently or has transited for 12 hours in those countries: Algeria, Botswana, Cabo Verde, Chad, Djibouti, Egypt, Eswatini, Ethiopia, Gambia, Ghana, Guinea, Lesotho, Libya, Equatorial Guinea, Eritrea, Madagascar, Malawi, Mauritania, Mauritius, Mozambique, Namibia, Nigeria, Papua New Guinea, Seychelles, Somalia, South Africa, Sudan, Tunisia, Uganda, Tanzania, Zambia and Zimbabwe.

=== Passport validity length ===
Very few countries, such as Paraguay, just require a valid passport on arrival.

However many countries and groupings now require only an identity card – especially from their neighbours. Other countries may have special bilateral arrangements that depart from the generality of their passport validity length policies to shorten the period of passport validity required for each other's citizens or even accept passports that have already expired (but not been cancelled).

Some countries, such as Japan, Ireland and the United Kingdom, require a passport valid throughout the period of the intended stay.

In the absence of specific bilateral agreements, countries requiring passports to be valid for at least 6 more months on arrival include Afghanistan, Algeria, Anguilla, Bahrain, Bhutan, Botswana, British Virgin Islands, Brunei, Cambodia, Cameroon, Cape Verde, Cayman Islands, Central African Republic, Chad, Comoros, Costa Rica, Côte d'Ivoire, Curaçao, Ecuador, Egypt, El Salvador, Equatorial Guinea, Fiji, Gabon, Guinea Bissau, Guyana, Haiti, India, Indonesia, Iran, Iraq, Israel, Jordan, Kenya, Kiribati, Kuwait, Laos, Madagascar, Malaysia, Marshall Islands, Mongolia, Myanmar, Namibia, Nepal, Nicaragua, Nigeria, Oman, Palau, Papua New Guinea, Peru, Philippines, Qatar, Rwanda, Samoa, Saudi Arabia, Singapore, Solomon Islands, Somalia, Sri Lanka, Sudan, Suriname, Tanzania, Thailand, Timor-Leste, Tokelau, Tonga, Turkey, Tuvalu, Uganda, United Arab Emirates, Vanuatu, Venezuela, and Vietnam.

Countries requiring passports valid for at least 4 months on arrival include Micronesia and Zambia.

Countries requiring passports with a validity of at least 3 months beyond the date of intended departure include Azerbaijan, Bosnia and Herzegovina, Honduras, Montenegro, Nauru, Moldova and New Zealand. Similarly, the EEA countries of Iceland, Liechtenstein, Norway, all European Union countries (except Ireland) together with Switzerland also require 3 months validity beyond the date of the bearer's intended departure unless the bearer is an EEA or Swiss national.

Countries requiring passports valid for at least 3 months on arrival include Albania, North Macedonia, Panama, and Senegal.

Bermuda requires passports to be valid for at least 45 days upon entry.

Countries that require a passport validity of at least one month beyond the date of intended departure include Eritrea, Hong Kong, Lebanon, Macau, the Maldives and South Africa.

==== Maximum passport age ====
Countries of the Schengen area require non-EU passports to be less than 10 years old upon entry.

=== Criminal record ===
Some countries, including Australia, Canada, Fiji, New Zealand and the United States, routinely deny entry to non-citizens who have a criminal record, while others impose restrictions depending on the type of conviction and the length of the sentence.

=== Persona non grata ===
The government of a country can declare a diplomat persona non grata, banning them from entering the country or expelling them if they have already entered. In non-diplomatic use, the authorities of a country may also declare a foreigner persona non grata permanently or temporarily, usually because of unlawful activity.

=== Israeli stamps ===
Kuwait, Lebanon, Libya, and Yemen do not allow entry to people with passport stamps from Israel or whose passports have either a used or an unused Israeli visa, or where there is evidence of previous travel to Israel such as entry or exit stamps from neighbouring border posts in transit countries such as Jordan and Egypt.

To circumvent this Arab League boycott of Israel, the Israeli immigration services have now mostly ceased to stamp foreign nationals' passports on either entry to or exit from Israel (unless the entry is for some work-related purposes). Since 15 January 2013, Israel no longer stamps foreign passports at Ben Gurion Airport. Passports are still (as of 22 June 2017) stamped at Erez when passing into and out of Gaza.

Iran refuses admission to holders of passports containing an Israeli visa or stamp that is less than 12 months old.

=== Biometrics ===
Several countries mandate that all travellers, or all foreign travellers, be fingerprinted on arrival and will refuse admission to or even arrest travellers who refuse to comply. In some countries, such as the United States, this may apply even to transit passengers who merely wish to change planes rather than go landside.

Fingerprinting countries/regions include Afghanistan, Argentina, Brunei, Cambodia, China, Ethiopia, Ghana, Guinea, India, Japan, Kenya (both fingerprints and a photo are taken), Malaysia upon entry and departure, Mongolia, Saudi Arabia, the Schengen Area, Singapore, South Korea, Taiwan, Thailand, Uganda, the United Arab Emirates and the United States.

Many countries also require a photo be taken of people entering the country. The United States, which does not fully implement exit control formalities at its land frontiers (although long mandated by its own legislation), intends to implement facial recognition for passengers departing from international airports to identify people who overstay their visa.

Together with fingerprint and face recognition, iris scanning is one of three biometric identification technologies internationally standardised since 2006 by the International Civil Aviation Organization (ICAO) for use in e-passports and the United Arab Emirates conducts iris scanning on visitors who need to apply for a visa. The United States Department of Homeland Security has announced plans to greatly increase the biometric data it collects at US borders. In 2018, Singapore began trials of iris scanning at three land and maritime immigration checkpoints.

== Travel consequences of Brexit ==
On 23 June 2016, a majority of the British electorate who voted, did so to leave the European Union in a nationwide referendum.

In March 2017, the UK sent notification of their intention to leave the EU to the European Council through Article 50 of the Lisbon Treaty. British citizens ceased to be EU citizens upon the UK's departure from the EU thus forfeiting the rights of citizens.

The UK withdrew from the EU on 31 January 2020, but British citizens retained the right of freedom of movement until the transitional period ended on 31 December 2020.

From 1 January 2021, when EU law ceased to apply to the United Kingdom, British citizens are afforded visa-free visits to the Schengen Area, for 90 days in any 180-day period. British citizens also enjoy visa-free entry to Bulgaria and Romania.

From sometime in 2026, most visa-exempt travellers seeking entry to the EU and EEA must apply and pay for travel authorisation through ETIAS. This was confirmed on 12 September 2018 and has no exception, yet agreed, for British citizens. This does not affect British-Irish travel which is governed by laws that pre-date the European Community.

When in a non-EU country where there is no British embassy, British citizens no longer have the right to consular protection from the embassy of any other EU country present in that country.

== Consular protection of British citizens abroad ==
Diplomatic missions of the United Kingdom

When in a country where there is no British embassy, British citizens may get help from the embassy of any other commonwealth country present in that country. There are also informal arrangements with some other countries, including New Zealand and Australia to help British nationals in some countries.

See also List of diplomatic missions of the United Kingdom.

== Foreign travel statistics ==
The following data from the Office for National Statistics Travel Trends database estimate the number of visits made by UK residents abroad to most-visited countries in the year 2024.

Country	Number of visits (thousands)
Canada	657
United States	4,055
Austria	844
Belgium	1,428
Bulgaria	624
Czechia	671
Cyprus	1,289
Denmark	874
Finland	225
France	9,347
Germany	3,244
Greece	3,777
Hungary	831
Republic of Ireland	3,626
Italy	4,839
Lithuania	404
Luxembourg	119
Malta	743
Netherlands	2,688
Norway	593
Poland	2,926
Portugal	3,685
Romania	1,644
Russia	19
Slovakia	270
Spain	17,771
Sweden	551
Switzerland	1,039
Turkey	4,081
Egypt	771
Morocco	1,243
Tunisia	300
South Africa	345
Nigeria	251
Israel	89
United Arab Emirates	1,401
Hong Kong	368
China (excluding Hong Kong)	620
India	2,053
Japan	373
Pakistan	625
Sri Lanka	178
Thailand	593
Australia	564
New Zealand	160
Barbados	180
Jamaica	259
Brazil	209
Mexico	567

== See also ==
- British passport
- British National (Overseas) passport
- Passports in Europe
- British nationality law
- Visa requirements for British Nationals (Overseas)
- Visa requirements for British Overseas Citizens
- Visa requirements for British Overseas Territories Citizens
- Visa policy of the United Kingdom
