= Visa requirements for British Nationals (Overseas) =

Entry restrictions

Visa requirements for British Nationals (Overseas) are administrative entry restrictions by the authorities of other states and territories placed on British National (Overseas) passport holders. British National (Overseas) status was available only to eligible Hong Kong residents who voluntarily registered before the 1997 handover. An estimated 2.9 million people are BN(O) status holders today, while the number of valid British National (Overseas) passports in circulation is significantly lower, at around 700,000, as many BN(O)s do not hold a current passport.

Holders of British National (Overseas) status are British nationals and Commonwealth citizens, but not British citizens. This nationality, by itself, does not grant the right of abode anywhere in the world, including the United Kingdom or Hong Kong, but all BN(O)s possess either right of abode or right to land in Hong Kong due to holding right of abode before 1997. BN(O)s are subject to British immigration controls and do not have the automatic right to live or work in the United Kingdom. From January 2021, they are eligible to apply for limited leave to remain to work or study in the UK with a path to citizenship, as a consequence of the Chinese national security law imposed on Hong Kong, which the UK considers a violation of the Sino-British Joint Declaration signed in 1984.

The British National (Overseas) status was created in 1985 in anticipation of the transfer of sovereignty over Hong Kong on 1 July 1997. This nationality was "tailor-made" for British Hong Kong residents with British Dependent Territories Citizen (BDTC) status by virtue of their connection with Hong Kong; it allowed the people of British Hong Kong to retain a relationship with the United Kingdom after the transfer of sovereignty over Hong Kong to China. BN(O)s enjoy consular protection as British nationals would when travelling outside Hong Kong. Since most BN(O)s also hold Chinese nationality, they do not enjoy consular protection in mainland China, Hong Kong and Macau. From 1 July 1987 to 30 June 1997, nearly 3.4 million of British Dependent Territories Citizens in Hong Kong successfully registered as a British National (Overseas). All BDTCs relate only to Hong Kong lost their BDTC status on 1 July 1997, and any BDTC who did not register as a BN(O) and without other nationality automatically acquired British Overseas Citizenship.

Visa requirements for other classes of British nationals such as British citizens, British Overseas Citizens, British Overseas Territories Citizens, British Protected Persons or British Subjects are different.

Starting from 31 January 2021, China no longer recognizes British National (Overseas) passports as valid travel documents. BN(O) passport holders need to use other identity documents such as their Hong Kong identity card for immigration clearance.

== Visa requirements map ==
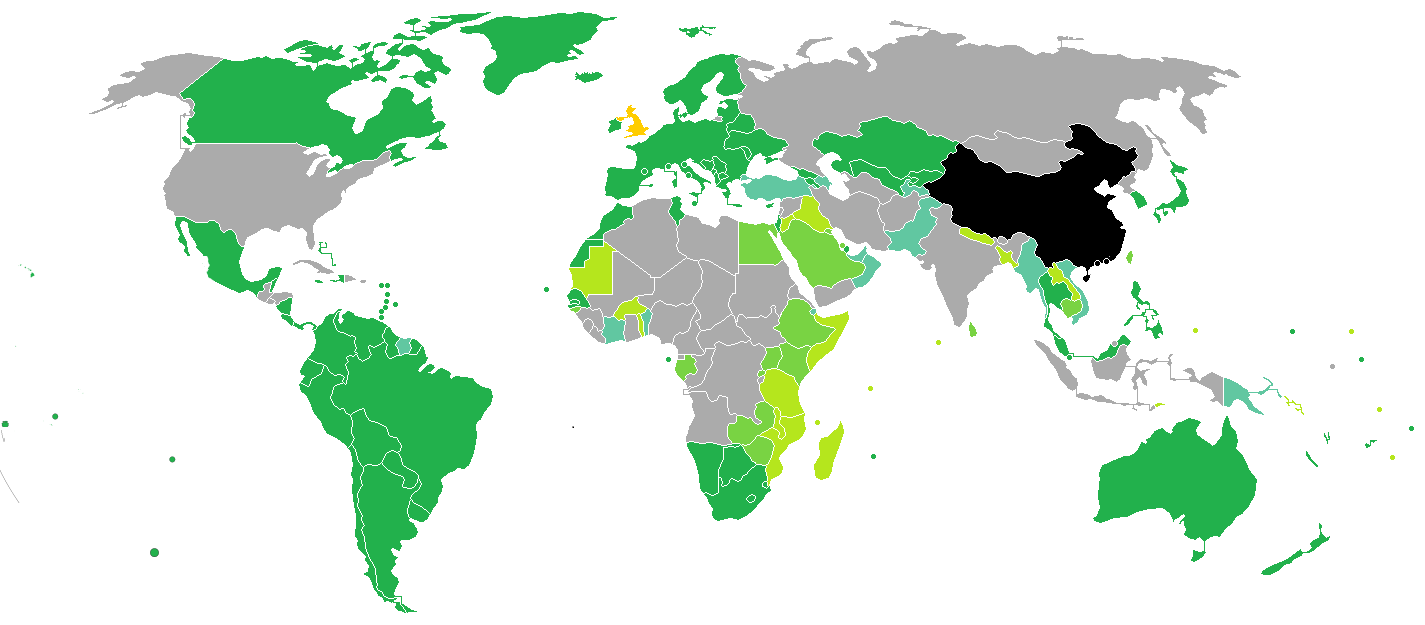
Countries and territories with visa-free or visa-on-arrival entries for British Nationals (Overseas) United Kingdom Admission refused Visa not required Visa on arrival eVisa Visa available both on arrival or online Visa required

== Visa requirements ==
Country	Visa requirement	Allowed stay	Notes (excluding departure fees)
Afghanistan	Visa required		
Albania	Visa not required	90 days	
Algeria	Visa required		
Andorra	Visa not required		
Angola	Visa not required	30 days	
Antigua and Barbuda	Visa not required	6 months	
Argentina	Visa not required	30 days	
Armenia	Visa not required	180 days	
Australia	Electronic Travel Authority	90 days	BN(O) citizens can apply for an Electronic Travel Authority (ETA) through the AustralianETA App on smart phone devices, which is valid for 12 months and allows BN(O) citizens to stay in Australia for 90 days per visit during the validity of the ETA.; In response to the imposition of National Security Law on Hong Kong, Australia introduced a pathway for BN(O) citizens to obtain permanent residency. BN(O) citizens in the temporary skilled worker or graduate visa categories are eligible for a visa grant or extension for 5 years, with a pathway to permanent residency after 4 years of residence in Australia, or 3 years in regional Australia.
Austria	Visa not required	90 days	90 days within any 180 day period in the Schengen Area
Azerbaijan	eVisa	30 days	
Bahamas	Visa not required	21 days: Extendable up to eight months.	
Bahrain	eVisa / Visa on arrival	3 months	Visas can be issued on arrival for a stay up to 3 months.; eVisa issued for 14 days, extendable once.
Bangladesh	Visa on arrival	30 days	Visa on arrival available at Dhaka International Airport
Barbados	Visa not required	6 months	
Belarus	Visa not required	30 days	Must arrive and leave via Minsk National Airport and not flights from Russia but this does not apply diplomatic or official passport holders.; Due to safety concerns, the UK Government advises its citizens to avoid travelling to Belarus.
Belgium	Visa not required	90 days	90 days within any 180 day period in the Schengen Area
Belize	Visa not required		
Benin	eVisa	30 days	Must have an international vaccination certificate.
Bhutan	eVisa		Visa via approved tour operators only
Bolivia	Visa not required	90 days	Be aware you may be given an initial 30 days and can extend it for another 60 days.; The Department of Immigration has imposed an annual limit for tourists of 90 days without a visa. For longer periods you must seek advice from the Bolivian Embassy in London or the Department of Immigration office in La Paz.
Bosnia and Herzegovina	Visa not required	90 days	90 days within any 6-month period.
Botswana	Visa not required	90 days	
Brazil	Visa not required	90 days	Extendable for further 90 days
Brunei	Visa required	BN(O) citizens transiting through Brunei International Airport for less than 24 hours do not require a visa; those traveling to a third country may obtain a transit visa on arrival for a maximum stay of 72 hours (fee: 5.00 BND/SGD).	
Bulgaria	Visa not required	90 days	90 days within any 180-day period in the Schengen Area.
Burkina Faso	eVisa / Visa on arrival	1 month	
Burundi	Visa on arrival	1 month	From December 2021, passengers of all countries that required visa, can now obtain visa on arrival at Bujumbura International Airport, and all land borders.
Cambodia	eVisa / Visa on arrival	30 days	Extendable for another 30 days.
Cameroon	eVisa		Pre-approved visa can be picked up on arrival.
Canada	Visa not required	6 months	Canada introduced a new immigration scheme for British National (Overseas) after the enforcement of the national security law in Hong Kong: 3-year open work permits will be available for applicants who graduated within 10 years from either a recognised Canadian or overseas post-secondary institution. The pathway to permanent residency will be expedited under the scheme if the applicant accrues 1 year of Canadian legal work experience with any work permit. Alternatively, immediate permanent residency is available for current graduates from Canadian post-secondary institutions.; eTA required if arriving by air.
Cape Verde	Visa not required	30 days	Must register online at least five days prior to arrival.
Central African Republic	Visa required		Due to security concerns, Government of UK advises its citizens to avoid travelling to Central African Republic.
Chad	Visa required		
Chile	Visa not required	90 days	May be extended.
China	Admission refused	BN(O) citizens who are also permanent residents of Hong Kong must enter China with a Mainland Travel Permit for Hong Kong and Macao Residents. Those who are also deemed Chinese citizens can stay in mainland China for the validity of the Travel Permit, they must apply for a separate resident permit if they stay for longer than six months, for employment or study. Those who are deemed non-Chinese citizens can only stay in China for up to 90 days as visitors, and must apply for an appropriate visa for other purposes using their other travel documents recognised by China.; BN(O) citizens who are not permanent residents of Hong Kong must use other travel documents recognised by China and apply for the appropriate visa to enter the country.	
Colombia	Visa not required	90 days	Extendable up to 180-days stay consecutively within a one-year period.
Comoros	Visa on arrival		
Republic of the Congo	Visa required		
Democratic Republic of the Congo	eVisa	7 days	
Costa Rica	Visa not required	30 days	
Côte d'Ivoire	eVisa	3 months	eVisa holders must arrive via Port Bouet Airport.
Croatia	Visa not required	90 days	90 days within any 180 day period in the Schengen Area
Cuba	Tourist card required	90 days	Can be extended up to 90 days with a fee.
Cyprus	Visa not required	90 days	90 days within any 180 day period
Czech Republic	Visa not required	90 days	90 days within any 180 day period in the Schengen Area
Denmark	Visa not required	90 days	90 days within any 180 day period in the Schengen Area (DK)
Djibouti	eVisa	31 days	
Dominica	Visa not required	6 months	
Dominican Republic	Visa required	Holders of a B1/B2 visa issued by United States can obtain a Tourist Card on arrival for a maximum stay of 30 days.	
Ecuador	Visa not required	90 days	May be extended.
Egypt	eVisa / Visa on arrival	30 days	
El Salvador	Visa required		
Equatorial Guinea	eVisa		
Eritrea	Visa required		Pre-approved visa can be picked up on arrival.
Estonia	Visa not required	90 days	90 days within any 180 day period in the Schengen Area
Eswatini	Visa not required	30 days	
Ethiopia	eVisa	up to 90 days	eVisa holders must arrive via Addis Ababa Bole International Airport.
Fiji	Visa not required	4 months	
Finland	Visa not required	90 days	90 days within any 180 day period in the Schengen Area
France	Visa not required	90 days	90 days within any 180 day period in the Schengen Area (in Regions of France)
Gabon	eVisa		Must arrive via Libreville International Airport.
Gambia	Visa not required	90 days	
Georgia	eVisa		
Germany	Visa not required	90 days	90 days within any 180 day period in the Schengen Area
Ghana	Visa required		Pre-approved visa can be picked up on arrival.
Greece	Visa not required	90 days	90 days within any 180 day period in the Schengen Area
Grenada	Visa not required	6 months	Beginning on 1 December 2020, all travellers to Grenada will be required to complete an online application in order to receive a Pure Safe Travel Authorization Certificate to enter Grenada.
Guatemala	Visa required		
Guinea	eVisa	90 days	
Guinea-Bissau	Visa on arrival	90 days	
Guyana	Visa required	BN(O) citizen passport holders require visa to enter Guyana and who may be unable to apply at any of Guyana's missions or consulates, visas will be issued on arrival.	
Haiti	Visa not required	90 days	
Honduras	Visa required		
Hungary	Visa not required	90 days	90 days within any 180 day period in the Schengen Area
Iceland	Visa not required	90 days	90 days within any 180 day period in the Schengen Area
India	eVisa	30 days	30 days, 1 year and 5 years of eTourist visa is now available from Indian eVisa. However this service is not available for British citizens of Pakistani origin (i.e. someone with at least 1 Pakistani parent or grandparent).
Indonesia	e-VOA / Visa on arrival	60 days	The (Visa on Arrival) costs 1,000,000 Indonesian rupiah, payable in cash or by card. It is valid for single entry only. You must meet passport validity requirements and have a return or onward ticket. For visa before available online.
Iran	Visa required		Due to security concerns, Government of UK advises its citizens to avoid travelling to Iran.
Iraq	Visa on arrival	60 days	British nationals can obtain a visa on arrival at Iraq's airports, land and sea crossings for 60 days, for a fee of US$75.; Visa not required for up to 30 days to Iraqi Kurdistan.; On 15 March 2021 the Iraqi government lifted pre-arrival visa requirements, allowing British citizens to apply for visa on arrival in any entry point.
Ireland	Visa not required	90 days	
Israel	Visa not required	3 months	
Italy	Visa not required	90 days	90 days within any 180 day period in the Schengen Area
Jamaica	Visa not required	180 days	
Japan	Visa not required	90 days	
Jordan	Free visa on arrival		Visa can be obtained upon arrival, it will cost a total of 40 JOD, obtainable at most international ports of entry and land border crossings (except King Hussein/Allenby Bridge)
Kazakhstan	Visa not required	30 days	
Kenya	Electronic Travel Authorisation	90 days	Can also enter on an East Africa Tourist Visa issued by Rwanda or Uganda.
Kiribati	Visa not required	30 days	
North Korea	Visa required		
South Korea	Visa not required	30 days	BNO passport has right to get E-ETA free till December 31, 2025. The government of the Republic of Korea announced that from April 1, 2023, to December 31, 2025, a K-ETA is not required for 27 countries citizens visiting Korea for 90 days or less for business or tourism.; BN(O) Citizen can enter South Korea as a short term visit (e.g., tours, visiting relatives or friends, attending simple meetings) up to 30 days without a visa, though you should remain aware of the quarantine requirements. You must also have an onward or return ticket. It is illegal to work on a tourist visa, whether as a teacher or in any other capacity.; You must be in possession of a Korea Electronic Travel Authorization (K-ETA) to enter Korea visa-free. You can complete your K-ETA application up to 24 hours before boarding your flight and it will be valid for two years from the date of approval. There is a small, non-refundable charge.
Kuwait	eVisa / Visa on arrival	3 months	
Kyrgyzstan	Visa not required	60 days	
Laos	eVisa / Visa on arrival	30 days	
Latvia	Visa not required	90 days	90 days within any 180 day period in the Schengen Area
Lebanon	Visa required		Tourist groups of minimum 8 people can obtain a visa on arrival at Beirut International Airport for a maximum stay of 6 months. They must be sponsored by a registered tour operator in Lebanon.
Lesotho	Visa not required	14 days	
Liberia	Visa required		Pre-approved visa can be picked up on arrival.
Libya	eVisa		Due to security concerns, Government of UK advises its citizens to avoid travelling to Libya.
Liechtenstein	Visa not required	90 days	90 days within any 180 day period in the Schengen Area
Lithuania	Visa not required	90 days	90 days within any 180 day period in the Schengen Area
Luxembourg	Visa not required	90 days	90 days within any 180 day period in the Schengen Area
Madagascar	Visa on arrival	60 days	
Malawi	Visa not required	30 days	
Malaysia	Visa not required	1 month	
Maldives	Free visa on arrival	30 days	
Mali	Visa required		
Malta	Visa not required	90 days	90 days within any 180 day period in the Schengen Area
Marshall Islands	Visa not required	90 days	90 days within any 180-day period
Mauritania	Visa on arrival		Available at Nouakchott–Oumtounsy International Airport.
Mauritius	Visa not required	90 days	
Mexico	Visa not required	180 days	
Micronesia	Visa not required	30 days	
Moldova	Visa not required	90 days	90 days within any 180 day period
Monaco	Visa not required	30 days	
Mongolia	Visa not required	30 days	
Montenegro	Visa not required	90 days	Must register with the local police station (either through a tourist organisation or at hotel reception) within 24 hours of arrival.
Morocco	Visa not required	90 days	For periods of longer than 90 days, a resident permit is required and can be issued by the Police Department in place of residence in Morocco.
Mozambique	Visa not required	30 days	
Myanmar	eVisa	28 days	eVisa holders must arrive via Yangon, Nay Pyi Taw or Mandalay airports or via land border crossings with Thailand — Tachileik, Myawaddy and Kawthaung or India — Rih Khaw Dar and Tamu.
Namibia	Visa not required	3 months	3 months within a calendar year
Nauru	Visa required	In addition of a visa, an application should be obtained by email via the Directorate of Immigration.	
Nepal	Online Visa / Visa on arrival	90 days	Visa-on-arrival is extendable
Netherlands	Visa not required	90 days	90 days within any 180 day period in the Schengen Area (European Netherlands)
New Zealand	Electronic Travel Authority	3 months	May enter using eGate.; Holders of a British non-citizen passport who can provide evidence of the right to reside permanently in the United Kingdom may be granted a Visitor Visa current for six months on arrival, subject to meeting character requirements and providing that the purposes of the visit do not include medical consultation or treatment. Electronic Travel Authority must be obtained prior to departure.; Holders of an Australian Permanent Resident Visa or Resident Return Visa may be granted a New Zealand Resident Visa on arrival permitting indefinite stay (pursuant to the Trans-Tasman Travel Arrangement), subject to meeting character requirements and obtaining an Electronic Travel Authority prior to departure.
Nicaragua	Visa not required	90 days	
Niger	Visa required		
Nigeria	eVisa	90 days	Pre-approved visa can be picked up on arrival.
North Macedonia	Visa required	BN(O) citizen can enter with a multiple-entry B1/B2 visa issued by US valid for at least 5 days longer than the duration of stay. They can stay for a maximum of 90 days in a period of 6 months, with a maximum stay of 15 days per visit.	
Norway	Visa not required	90 days	90 days within any 180 day period in the Schengen Area
Oman	Visa not required / eVisa	14 days / 30 days	
Pakistan	Online Visa / ETA	30 days	Electronic Travel Authorization to obtain a visa on arrival for tourism purposes.; Electronic Travel Authorization to obtain a visa on arrival for business purposes.; Online Visa eligible.
Palau	Free visa on arrival	30 days	
Panama	Visa not required	90 days	As of December 2021: The maximum time of stay in Panama will be 1 to 3 months. If the visa is granted for 3 months, it cannot be extended. If the visa is for a shorter time and you need to extend your stay, you must apply personally to the National Immigration Service Directorate upon arrival in Panama.; Regular entry: Visa stamp (180 days) length determined on arrival; The maximum amount of time that you can stay in Panama is six months. For longer than six months, you may extend your stay applying for an extension of visa with the Offices of Immigration in Panama. British nationals don't need a visa to visit Panama except if arriving by sea.
Papua New Guinea	eVisa	60 days	Issued free of charge
Paraguay	Visa not required	90 days	
Peru	Visa not required	183 days	Visa stamp (up to 183 days) length determined on arrival
Philippines	Visa not required	7 days	A tourist visa is available from the Philippine Embassy before you travel, which will allow an initial total of 59-day stay.; For longer periods, a visa extension is available once inside the country from the Bureau of immigration.
Poland	Visa not required	90 days	90 days within any 180 day period in the Schengen Area
Portugal	Visa not required	90 days	90 days within any 180 day period in the Schengen Area
Qatar	Visa required		
Romania	Visa not required	90 days	90 days within any 180-day period in the Schengen Area.
Russia	Visa required		Due to security concerns, Government of UK advises its citizens to avoid travelling to Russia.
Rwanda	Visa not required	30 days	Can also be entered on an East Africa Tourist Visa issued by Kenya or Uganda.
Saint Kitts and Nevis	Visa not required	3 months	
Saint Lucia	Visa not required	6 weeks	
Saint Vincent and the Grenadines	Visa not required	6 months	
Samoa	Free Entry Permit on arrival	60 days	
San Marino	Visa not required		
São Tomé and Príncipe	Visa not required	15 days	
Saudi Arabia	eVisa / Visa on arrival	90 days	
Senegal	Visa not required	90 days	
Serbia	Visa not required	90 days	
Seychelles	Free Visitor's Permit on arrival	3 months	
Sierra Leone	eVisa / Visa on arrival	30 days	
Singapore	Visa not required	30 days	British passport holders who produce evidence of the right to reside permanently in the United Kingdom may travel to Singapore without visa for 90 days.
Slovakia	Visa not required	90 days	90 days within any 180 day period in the Schengen Area
Slovenia	Visa not required	90 days	90 days within any 180 day period in the Schengen Area
Solomon Islands	Free Visitor's permit on arrival	3 months	Issued free of charge.
Somalia	Visa on arrival	Available at Berbera, Borama, Burao, Erigavo and Hargeisa airports.; 30 days, available at Bosaso Airport, Galcaio Airport and Mogadishu Airport.	
South Africa	Visa not required	30 days	
South Sudan	eVisa	Obtainable online; Printed visa authorization must be presented at the time of travel	
Spain	Visa not required	90 days	90 days within any 180 day period in the Schengen Area
Sri Lanka	eVisa / Visa on arrival	4 months	Visa on arrival with Electronic Travel Authorization.; British Nationals (Overseas) are allowed to extend their stay twice when in the country to a maximum stay of 90 days in total.
Sudan	Visa required		
Suriname	Visa not required	90 days	An entrance fee of US$25 or 25 Euros must be paid online prior to arrival.; Multiple entry eVisa is also available.
Sweden	Visa not required	90 days	90 days within any 180 day period in the Schengen Area
Switzerland	Visa not required	90 days	90 days within any 180 day period in the Schengen Area
Syria	Visa required		Due to security concerns, Government of UK advises its citizens to avoid travelling to Syria.
Tajikistan	eVisa	45 days	
Tanzania	eVisa / Visa on arrival	3 months	
Thailand	Visa not required	30 days (as of April 1, 2023)	If not arriving by air, British Nationals (Overseas) are only permitted two visits per year.; For longer periods up to 60 days, a Tourist visa is available online.
Timor-Leste	Visa on arrival	30 days	Visa on arrival is only available at the Presidente Nicolau Lobato International Airport or at the Dili Sea Port.
Togo	eVisa	15 days	
Tonga	Free visa on arrival	31 days	
Trinidad and Tobago	Visa not required		
Tunisia	Visa not required	3 months	
Turkey	eVisa	3 months	
Turkmenistan	Visa required		Pre-approved visa can be picked up on arrival.
Tuvalu	Free visa on arrival	1 month	
Uganda	eVisa	3 months	May apply online.; Can also be entered on an East Africa Tourist Visa issued by Kenya or Rwanda.
Ukraine	Visa required		Due to ongoing Russian invasion of Ukraine, Government of UK advises its citizens to avoid travelling to Ukraine.
United Arab Emirates	eVisa	Visitors normally require a sponsor but visas can also be arranged online through an airline if they are arriving on Air Arabia, Air Astana, Emirates, Etihad (and Air Baltic and Air Serbia), flydubai, Turkish Airlines and Indigo Airlines; Issued free of charge.	
United Kingdom	Bespoke UK Immigration Status	6 Months (Visitors, extendable by converting into a BN(O) visa from inside the UK); Unlimited (With a valid BN(O) visa)	BN(O) citizens who are inside or outside of the UK can choose to apply for a British National (Overseas) BN(O) visa, which allows the passport holder to live, work or study in the UK for unlimited periods of up to 5 years in each visa renewal.; BN(O) citizens are eligible to choose to apply for settled status after 5 years of qualifying residence in the UK.; BN(O) citizens are eligible to choose to additionally register as a British citizen after 12 months with settled status, under Section 4c of the British Nationality Act 1981. British citizenship confers right of abode in the UK.; Obtaining British citizenship under the above route does not cause one to lose BN(O) status.
United States	Visa required	BN(O) citizens who do receive a visa are normally issued with 10-years multiple-entry combination B1/B2 visas, and each entry can stay for a maximum of 6 months (the period of stay is subject to the border immigration officer); In response to the imposition of national security law on Hong Kong, certain BN(O) citizens who were present in the US as of 26 January 2023, and continuously meet the eligibility requirements are protected by Deferred Enforced Departure for 24 months from 26 January 2023, with full working right during this period.	
Uruguay	Visa not required	90 days	
Uzbekistan	eVisa		
Vanuatu	Visa not required	30 days	
Vatican City	Visa not required		
Venezuela	Visa not required	90 days	Extensions of up to 90 days can be arranged at any SAIME (immigration service) for a fee and must apply before one's tourist card and stamp expire.; One can only apply for or extend their (residency permit) at the main SAIME office in Caracas.
Vietnam	Visa required	BN(O) citizens must obtain a traditional visa (sticker) or a "Landing Visa Approval Letter" before departure, and prepare two recent color photos and US$25 in cash (single entry). Upon arrival at the Vietnamese airport, they can obtain a visa on arrival.	
Yemen	Visa required		A single tourist visa for British Nationals (Overseas) is issued for a maximum stay of 60 days from arrival into Yemen.
Zambia	Visa not required	90 days	British Nationals (Overseas) are eligible for a universal visa allowing access to Zimbabwe.
Zimbabwe	eVisa / Visa on arrival	3 months	British Nationals (Overseas) are also eligible for a universal visa allowing access to Zambia.

== British Crown Dependencies and Overseas Territories ==
British Crown Dependencies and Overseas Territories
Visitor to		Visa requirement	Allowed stay	Notes
Akrotiri and Dhekelia		Visa not required		
Anguilla		Visa not required	3 months	British Nationals (Overseas) with a connection to the territory have right of abode.
Bermuda		Visa not required	6 months	British Nationals (Overseas) with a connection to the territory have right of abode.
British Antarctic Territory		Special permit required		
British Indian Ocean Territory		Special permit required		
British Virgin Islands		Visa not required	1 month	Extension of stay possible.; British Nationals (Overseas) with a connection to the territory have right of abode.
Cayman Islands		Visa not required	30 Days	The passenger must arrive directly from the United Kingdom.; British Nationals (Overseas) with a connection to the territory have right of abode.
Falkland Islands		Visitor's permit on arrival	4 weeks	The initial visitor's permit is valid for 4 weeks.; Visitors who have a connection with the Falkland Islands have right of abode.
Guernsey		Leave to Enter/Remain to Settlement		BN(O) citizens have the same immigration rights as in the UK to settle in Guernsey.
Isle of Man		Leave to Enter/Remain to Settlement		BN(O) citizens have the same immigration rights as in the UK to settle in Isle of Man.
Jersey		Leave to Enter/Remain to Settlement		BN(O) citizens have the same immigration rights as in the UK to settle in Jersey.
Gibraltar		Visa not required		
Montserrat		Visa not required	6 months	British Nationals (Overseas) with a connection to the territory have right of abode.
Pitcairn Islands		Visa not required	14 days	Landing fee applies.
(United Kingdom) Saint Helena, Ascension and Tristan da Cunha
(United Kingdom) Saint Helena, Ascension and Tristan da Cunha	Ascension Island	eVisa	3 months	3 months within any year period
(United Kingdom) Saint Helena, Ascension and Tristan da Cunha	Saint Helena	Entry permit on arrival	183 days	The entry permit costs £25 and is issued on arrival.
(United Kingdom) Saint Helena, Ascension and Tristan da Cunha	Tristan da Cunha	Permission required		Permission to land required for 15/30 pounds sterling (yacht/ship passenger) for Tristan da Cunha Island or 20 pounds sterling for Gough Island, Inaccessible Island or Nightingale Islands, unless connection with Tristan da Cunha, in which case right of abode.
South Georgia and the South Sandwich Islands		Permit required		Pre-arrival permit from the Commissioner required (72 hours/1 month for 110/160 pounds sterling).
Turks and Caicos Islands		Visa not required	90 days	British Nationals (Overseas) with a connection to the territory have right of abode.

== Territories and disputed areas ==
Europe
Visitor to	Visa requirement	Notes (excluding departure fees)
Abkhazia	Visa required	
Mount Athos	Special permit required	Special permit required (4 days: 25 euro for Orthodox visitors, 35 euro for non-Orthodox visitors, 18 euro for students). There is a visitors' quota: maximum 100 Orthodox and 10 non-Orthodox per day and women are not allowed.
(Belarus) Belovezhskaya Pushcha National Park	Visa not required	3 days; must first obtain an electronic pass
(Autonomous Republic of Crimea) Crimea	Visa required	Visa policy of Russia applies de facto.
Turkish Republic of Northern Cyprus	Visa not required	3 months
(United Nations) UN Buffer Zone in Cyprus	Access Permit required	Access Permit is required for travelling inside the zone, except Civil Use Areas.
Faroe Islands	Visa not required	
(Norway) Jan Mayen	Permit required	Permit issued by the local police required for staying for less than 24 hours and permit issued by the Norwegian police for staying for more than 24 hours.
Kosovo	Visa not required	90 days
Novorossiya	Restricted area	Crossing from Ukraine requires visit purpose to be explained to Ukrainian passport control on exit and those who entered from Russia are not allowed to proceed further into Ukraine.
Russia	Special authorization required	Several closed cities and regions in Russia require special authorization.
South Ossetia	Visa not required	Multiple entry visa to Russia and three-day prior notification are required to enter South Ossetia.
Transnistria	Visa not required	Registration required after 24h.
Africa
Visitor to	Visa requirement	Notes (excluding departure fees)
Eritrea outside Asmara	Travel permit required	To travel in the rest of the country, a Travel Permit for Foreigners is required (20 Eritrean nakfa).
Mayotte	Visa not required	90 days
Réunion	Visa not required	90 days
Sahrawi Arab Democratic Republic	Visa not required	Visa not required up to 3 months.
Somaliland	Visa on arrival	30 days for 30 US dollars, payable on arrival.
Sudan	Travel permit required	All foreigners traveling more than 25 kilometers outside of Khartoum must obtain a travel permit.
(Sudan) Darfur	Travel permit required	Separate travel permit is required.
Asia
Visitor to	Visa requirement	Notes (excluding departure fees)
Hong Kong	Right of Abode or Right to Land Status Holder. Must use other identity documents in conjunction with the BN(O) passport for Hong Kong immigration clearance.	The Hong Kong SAR government does not recognise BN(O) passports as valid documents for immigration clearance and identification purposes. BN(O) citizens are instead entitled to a Hong Kong identity card which attests the passport holder the Right of Abode or Right to Land status in Hong Kong, implying BN(O) citizens the right to live, work or study in Hong Kong without any immigration controls.
India PAP/RAP	PAP/RAP required	Protected Area Permit (PAP) required for whole states of Nagaland and Sikkim and parts of states Manipur, Arunachal Pradesh, Uttaranchal, Jammu and Kashmir, Rajasthan, Himachal Pradesh. Restricted Area Permit (RAP) required for all of Andaman and Nicobar Islands and parts of Sikkim. Some of these requirements are occasionally lifted for a year.
Iraqi Kurdistan	Visa on arrival	15 days
Kazakhstan	Special permission required	Special permission required for the town of Baikonur and surrounding areas in Kyzylorda Oblast, and the town of Gvardeyskiy near Almaty.
(Iran) Kish Island	Visa not required	Visitors to Kish Island do not require a visa.
Macao	Visa not required	The Macau SAR government has no official announcement regarding the admissibility/ inadmissibility of BN(O) passport holders. BN(O) citizens are able to visit Macau with their Hong Kong Identity Card for up to 1 year.
(Malaysia) Sabah and Sarawak	Visa not required	1 month. These two Malaysian states have their own immigration authorities and a valid passport is required to travel between them, however the same Malaysian visa applies. Length of stay will not be extended for travel between Peninsular Malaysia and East Malaysia.
Maldives	Permission required	With the exception of the capital Malé, tourists are generally prohibited from visiting non-resort islands without the express permission of the Government of Maldives.
North Korea outside Pyongyang	Special permit required	People are not allowed to leave the capital city, tourists can only leave the capital with a governmental tourist guide (no independent moving)
Palestine	Visa not required	Arrival by sea to Gaza Strip not allowed.
Taiwan	Exit & Entry Permit required	BN(O) citizens may apply for an entry permit to Taiwan under the following conditions. Those who meet the criteria may apply for a free permit or obtain a visa on arrival at a Taiwanese airport (fee: NT$300), allowing a stay of up to 30 days (non-extendable): (1) The place of birth shown in the passport is “Hong Kong” or “Macau”.; or (2) not born in Hong Kong or Macau but having previously traveled to Taiwan as Hong Kong or Macau permanent residents after 1983; or (3) holding a valid Exit & Entry Permit issued by the Republic of China (Taiwan) for Hong Kong and Macau residents. For the free 30-day online entry permit, the following document types are available: (a) a single-entry Exit & Entry Permit valid for three months; or (b) a two-entry permit valid for three months, with the second entry restricted to arrival by cruise. BN(O) citizens who do not meet any of the above conditions, or who intend to stay in Taiwan for 31 to 90 days, may apply for an Exit & Entry Permit through the online application system prior to departure (fee: NT$600). Upon approval, applicants must print the “Online Application for Temporary Entry Permit for Hong Kong and Macau Residents” on A4 paper in either black and white or colour; recycled paper is not permitted.
(Tajikistan) Gorno-Badakhshan Autonomous Province	OIVR permit required	OIVR permit required (15+5 Tajikistani Somoni) and another special permit (free of charge) is required for Lake Sarez.
Turkmenistan	Special permit required	A special permit, issued prior to arrival by Ministry of Foreign Affairs, is required if visiting the following places: Atamurat, Cheleken, Dashoguz, Serakhs and Serhetabat.
(United Nations) Korean Demilitarized Zone	Restricted zone	
(United Nations) UNDOF Zone and Ghajar	Restricted zone	
(Vietnam) Phú Quốc	Visa not required	Can visit without a visa for up to 30 days.
Yemen	Special permission required	Special permission needed for travel outside Sanaa or Aden.
Caribbean and North Atlantic
Visitor to	Visa requirement	Notes (excluding departure fees)
Aruba	Visa not required	30 days, extendable to 180 days
(Netherlands) Bonaire, St. Eustatius and Saba	Visa not required	90 days
(Colombia) San Andrés and Leticia	Tourist Card on arrival	Visitors arriving at Gustavo Rojas Pinilla International Airport and Alfredo Vásquez Cobo International Airport must buy tourist cards on arrival.
Curacao	Visa not required	3 months
(France) French Guiana	Visa not required	90 days
(France) French West Indies	Visa not required	90 days. French West Indies refers to Martinique, Guadeloupe, Saint Martin and Saint Barthélemy.
Greenland	Visa not required	
(Venezuela) Margarita Island	Visa not required	All visitors are fingerprinted.
Puerto Rico	Visa required	US visa required
Saint Pierre and Miquelon	Visa not required	
Sint Maarten	Visa not required	3 months
U.S. Virgin Islands	Visa required	US visa required
Oceania
Visitor to	Visa requirement	Notes (excluding departure fees)
American Samoa	Visa required	US visa required
(Australia) Ashmore and Cartier Islands	Special authorisation required	Special authorisation required.
(France) Clipperton Island	Special permit required	Special permit required.
Cook Islands	Visa not required	31 days
(Fiji) Lau Province	Special permission required	Special permission required.
French Polynesia	Visa not required	90 days
Guam	Visa not required	45 days
New Caledonia	Visa not required	90 days
Niue	Free Visa on arrival	Visa on arrival valid for 30 days is issued free of charge.
Northern Mariana Islands	Visa not required	Visa not required under the Guam - CNMI Visa Waiver Program, for 45 days. Must also present a Hong Kong identity card.
United States Minor Outlying Islands	Special permit required	Special permits required for Baker Island, Howland Island, Jarvis Island, Johnston Atoll, Kingman Reef, Midway Atoll, Palmyra Atoll and Wake Island.
Wallis and Futuna	Visa not required	90 days
South America
Visitor to	Visa requirement	Notes (excluding departure fees)
Galápagos	Pre-registration required	Online pre-registration is required. Transit Control Card must also be obtained at the airport prior to departure.
South Atlantic and Antarctica
Visitor to	Visa requirement	Notes (excluding departure fees)
Antarctica		Special permits required for French Southern and Antarctic Lands, Argentine Antarctica, (Australia) Australian Antarctic Territory, Bouvet Island, (Antártica Chilena Province) Chilean Antarctic Territory, (Australia) Heard Island and McDonald Islands, (Norway) Peter I Island, (Norway) Queen Maud Land, (New Zealand) Ross Dependency.

== Non-visa restrictions ==
=== Blank passport pages ===
Many countries require a minimum number of blank pages to be available in the passport being presented, typically one or two pages. Endorsement pages, which often appear after the visa pages, are not counted as being valid or available.

=== Vaccination ===
Cover of the new International Certificate of Vaccination issued by the Bureau of Quarantine in the Philippines since 2021

The African countries of Angola, Benin, Burkina Faso, Burundi, Cameroon, Central African Republic, Democratic Republic of the Congo, Republic of the Congo, Côte d'Ivoire, Gabon, Ghana, Guinea-Bissau, Mali, Niger, Sierra Leone and Togo, South Sudan and Uganda, along with French Guiana in South America, require all incoming passengers older than nine months to one year, to have a current International Certificate of Vaccination or Prophylaxis.

Some other countries require vaccination only if the passenger is coming from an infected area or has visited one recently or has transited for 12 hours in those countries: Algeria, Botswana, Cabo Verde, Chad, Djibouti, Egypt, Eswatini, Ethiopia, Gambia, Ghana, Guinea, Lesotho, Libya, Equatorial Guinea, Eritrea, Madagascar, Malawi, Mauritania, Mauritius, Mozambique, Namibia, Nigeria, Papua New Guinea, Seychelles, Somalia, South Africa, Sudan, Tunisia, Uganda, Tanzania, Zambia and Zimbabwe.

=== Passport validity length ===
Very few countries, such as Paraguay, just require a valid passport on arrival.

However many countries and groupings now require only an identity card – especially from their neighbours. Other countries may have special bilateral arrangements that depart from the generality of their passport validity length policies to shorten the period of passport validity required for each other's citizens or even accept passports that have already expired (but not been cancelled).

Some countries, such as Japan, Ireland and the United Kingdom, require a passport valid throughout the period of the intended stay.

In the absence of specific bilateral agreements, countries requiring passports to be valid for at least 6 more months on arrival include Afghanistan, Algeria, Anguilla, Bahrain, Bhutan, Botswana, British Virgin Islands, Brunei, Cambodia, Cameroon, Cape Verde, Cayman Islands, Central African Republic, Chad, Comoros, Costa Rica, Côte d'Ivoire, Curaçao, Ecuador, Egypt, El Salvador, Equatorial Guinea, Fiji, Gabon, Guinea Bissau, Guyana, Haiti, India, Indonesia, Iran, Iraq, Israel, Jordan, Kenya, Kiribati, Kuwait, Laos, Madagascar, Malaysia, Marshall Islands, Mongolia, Myanmar, Namibia, Nepal, Nicaragua, Nigeria, Oman, Palau, Papua New Guinea, Peru, Philippines, Qatar, Rwanda, Samoa, Saudi Arabia, Singapore, Solomon Islands, Somalia, Sri Lanka, Sudan, Suriname, Tanzania, Thailand, Timor-Leste, Tokelau, Tonga, Turkey, Tuvalu, Uganda, United Arab Emirates, Vanuatu, Venezuela, and Vietnam.

Countries requiring passports valid for at least 4 months on arrival include Micronesia and Zambia.

Countries requiring passports with a validity of at least 3 months beyond the date of intended departure include Azerbaijan, Bosnia and Herzegovina, Honduras, Montenegro, Nauru, Moldova and New Zealand. Similarly, the EEA countries of Iceland, Liechtenstein, Norway, all European Union countries (except Ireland) together with Switzerland also require 3 months validity beyond the date of the bearer's intended departure unless the bearer is an EEA or Swiss national.

Countries requiring passports valid for at least 3 months on arrival include Albania, North Macedonia, Panama, and Senegal.

Bermuda requires passports to be valid for at least 45 days upon entry.

Countries that require a passport validity of at least one month beyond the date of intended departure include Eritrea, Hong Kong, Lebanon, Macau, the Maldives and South Africa.

==== Maximum passport age ====
Countries of the Schengen area require non-EU passports to be less than 10 years old upon entry.

=== Criminal record ===
Some countries, including Australia, Canada, Fiji, New Zealand and the United States, routinely deny entry to non-citizens who have a criminal record, while others impose restrictions depending on the type of conviction and the length of the sentence.

=== Persona non grata ===
The government of a country can declare a diplomat persona non grata, banning them from entering the country or expelling them if they have already entered. In non-diplomatic use, the authorities of a country may also declare a foreigner persona non grata permanently or temporarily, usually because of unlawful activity.

=== Israeli stamps ===
Kuwait, Lebanon, Libya, and Yemen do not allow entry to people with passport stamps from Israel or whose passports have either a used or an unused Israeli visa, or where there is evidence of previous travel to Israel such as entry or exit stamps from neighbouring border posts in transit countries such as Jordan and Egypt.

To circumvent this Arab League boycott of Israel, the Israeli immigration services have now mostly ceased to stamp foreign nationals' passports on either entry to or exit from Israel (unless the entry is for some work-related purposes). Since 15 January 2013, Israel no longer stamps foreign passports at Ben Gurion Airport. Passports are still (as of 22 June 2017) stamped at Erez when passing into and out of Gaza.

Iran refuses admission to holders of passports containing an Israeli visa or stamp that is less than 12 months old.

=== Biometrics ===
Several countries mandate that all travellers, or all foreign travellers, be fingerprinted on arrival and will refuse admission to or even arrest travellers who refuse to comply. In some countries, such as the United States, this may apply even to transit passengers who merely wish to change planes rather than go landside.

Fingerprinting countries/regions include Afghanistan, Argentina, Brunei, Cambodia, China, Ethiopia, Ghana, Guinea, India, Japan, Kenya (both fingerprints and a photo are taken), Malaysia upon entry and departure, Mongolia, Saudi Arabia, the Schengen Area, Singapore, South Korea, Taiwan, Thailand, Uganda, the United Arab Emirates and the United States.

Many countries also require a photo be taken of people entering the country. The United States, which does not fully implement exit control formalities at its land frontiers (although long mandated by its own legislation), intends to implement facial recognition for passengers departing from international airports to identify people who overstay their visa.

Together with fingerprint and face recognition, iris scanning is one of three biometric identification technologies internationally standardised since 2006 by the International Civil Aviation Organization (ICAO) for use in e-passports and the United Arab Emirates conducts iris scanning on visitors who need to apply for a visa. The United States Department of Homeland Security has announced plans to greatly increase the biometric data it collects at US borders. In 2018, Singapore began trials of iris scanning at three land and maritime immigration checkpoints.

== Right to consular protection ==
Diplomatic missions of the United Kingdom

British Nationals (Overseas) have the right to consular protection from British diplomatic missions except in China, Hong Kong, and Macau.

When in a country where there is no British embassy, British Nationals (Overseas) may get help from the embassy of any other commonwealth country present in that country. There are also informal arrangements with some other countries, including New Zealand and Australia, to help British nationals in some countries.

== Foreign travel statistics ==
According to the Foreign travel advice provided by the British Government (unless otherwise noted) these are the numbers of British visitors to various countries per annum in 2015 (unless otherwise noted):

Foreign travel statistics

Country	Number of visitors	Lost or stolen passports
Albania (Note: Data for 2014)	80,000	
American Samoa (Note: Data for 2017)	119	
Angola (Note: Data for 2015)	14,267/12,319 ?	
Andorra (Note: Data for 2016)	150,000	
Anguilla	5,021	
Antarctica	3,915	
Antigua and Barbuda	70,701	
Aruba	10,447	
Australia	731,900	640
Austria (Note: Counting only guests in tourist accommodation establishments.)	919,500	
Azerbaijan	29,514	
Bahamas	28,022	
Bangladesh	150,000	
Barbados	218,638	
Belarus	6,000	
Belgium	868,173	
Belize	13,342	
Bermuda	41,348	
Bhutan	3,246	
Bolivia	17,528	
Bosnia and Herzegovina	12,715	
Botswana	41,011	
Brazil	185,858	
Brunei (Note: Data for 2011)	18,222	
Bulgaria (Note: Data for 2018)	424,384	
Burkina Faso	1,343	
Cambodia	159,489	
Cameroon	16,008	
Canada	819,530	
Cape Verde	126,685	
Cayman Islands (Note: Data for arrivals by air only.)	14,017	
Chile	54,714	
China	594,300	
Colombia	39,715	
Congo (Note: Data for 2012)	6,115	
Cook Islands	2,954	
Costa Rica	76,173	
Croatia	750,675	
Cuba	155,802	
Curacao	2,806	
Cyprus	1,327,805	
Czech Republic	470,576	
Denmark	150,000	
Dominica	4,951	
Dominican Republic	177,534	
Ecuador	27,126	
Egypt	865,000	
Ethiopia	20,000	
Estonia	58,402	
Eswatini	15,503	
Fiji	16,925	
Finland	232,071	
France	12,235,713	1,344
French Polynesia	2,840	
Gambia	60,424	
Ghana	90,000	
Georgia	29,406	
Germany	2,551,061	606
Greece	2,397,169	
Greenland	1,595	
Grenada	25,351	
Guadeloupe	<1,000	
Hong Kong	555,353	
Hungary	376,573	
Iceland	297,963	
Indonesia	352,017	
India	986,296	
Ireland	3,547,000	
Israel	198,500	
Italy	4,922,000	737
Jamaica	217,647	
Japan	310,500	
Jordan	64,776	
Kazakhstan	21,341	
Kiribati	173	
Kuwait	7,000	
Kenya	100,000	
Kyrgyzstan	6,900	
Laos	27,723	
Latvia	95,357	
Lebanon	61,994	
Lesotho (Note: Data for 2013)	2,380	
Liechtenstein	2,200	
Lithuania	58,200	
Luxembourg	69,350	
Macau	57,121	
Madagascar	3,167	
Malaysia	358,818	
Malawi (Note: Data for 2009)	51,145	
Maldives	103,977	
Malta	640,570	
Mali	900	
Marshall Islands	51	
Mauritius	149,807	
Mexico	563,099	
Moldova	11,555	
Mongolia	6,012	
Montenegro	37,464	
Montserrat (Note: Data for 2010)	1,380	
Morocco	554,000	
Myanmar	51,051	
Namibia	27,365	
Nepal	29,730	
New Caledonia	708	
Nigeria	117,000	
Niue	146	
North Macedonia	8,856	
Norway	581,000	
Netherlands	2,195,000	602
New Zealand	249,264	
Nicaragua	16,923	
Oman	143,224	
Pakistan	275,400	
Palau	852	
Panama	16,338	
Papua New Guinea	6,974	
Peru	69,506	
Philippines	182,708	
Poland	796,900	
Portugal	2,600,000	405
Qatar	120,495	
Romania (Note: Data for 2019)	243,991	
Russia	193,522	
Saba	200	
Saint Lucia	68,175	
Saint Vincent and the Grenadines	17,045	
Samoa	1,422	
San Marino	5,750	
São Tomé and Príncipe (Note: Data for 2005)	83	
Serbia	32,802	
Seychelles	21,906	
Singapore	518,903	
Sint Eustatius	200	
Slovakia	77,837	
Slovenia	118,508	
Solomon Islands	496	
South Africa	407,486	
South Korea	126,024	
Spain	18,502,722	5,605
Sri Lanka	201,879	
Suriname	1,077	
Switzerland	709,925	430
Sweden	603,000	
Taiwan	104,911	
Tanzania	67,742	
Thailand	994,468	603
Timor-Leste	1,253	
Tonga	1,102	
Trinidad and Tobago	37,473	
Turkey	2,254,871	
Turks and Caicos	6,399	
Tuvalu	59	
Uganda	43,009	
Uruguay	20,000	
Ukraine	78,603	
United Arab Emirates	1,265,000	
United States (Note: Total number includes tourists, business travelers, students, exchange visitors, temporary workers and families, diplomats and other representatives and all other classes of nonimmigrant admissions (I-94).)	5,076,167	1,539
Uzbekistan	1,800	
Venezuela	20,837	
Vietnam	283,537	
Zambia	36,997	

== See also ==
- British passport
- British National (Overseas)
- British National (Overseas) passport
- British nationality law
- Visa requirements for British Citizens
- Visa requirements for British Overseas Citizens
- Visa requirements for British Overseas Territories Citizens
- Visa requirements for Chinese citizens of Hong Kong
- Visa policy of the United Kingdom
