= Visa requirements for British Overseas citizens =

British Overseas citizenship is a form of British nationality under the British Nationality Act 1983. BOCs are British nationals but do not have the right of abode in the United Kingdom. This citizenship is normally for certain people who retained British nationality after independence (e.g. Kenya), but do not have enough ties with the United Kingdom to be British Citizens.

Visa requirements for other classes of British nationals such as British citizens, British Nationals (Overseas), British Overseas Territories Citizens, British Protected Persons or British Subjects are different.

== Visa requirements map ==
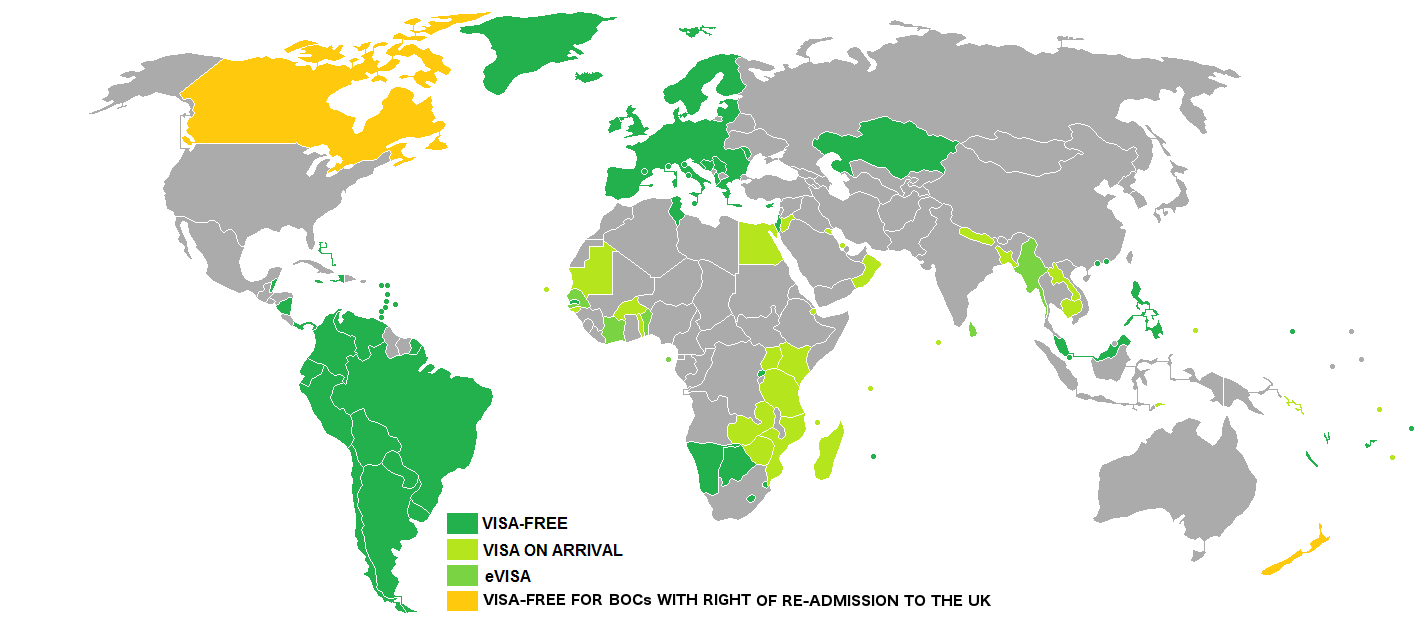
Countries and territories with visa-free or visa-on-arrival entries for British Overseas Citizens Visa Free Access Visa issued upon arrival eVisa Visa Free Access only to BOCs with right of re-admission to the UK Visa required

== Visa requirements ==
Country	Visa requirement	Allowed stay	Notes (excluding departure fees)
Afghanistan	Visa required		
Albania	Visa not required	90 days	
Algeria	Visa required		
Andorra	Visa not required		
Angola	Visa required		
Antigua and Barbuda	Visa not required	6 months	
Argentina	Visa not required	30 days	
Armenia	Visa required		
Australia	Visa required		
Austria	Visa not required	90 days	90 days within any 180 day period in the Schengen Area
Azerbaijan	Visa required		
Bahamas	Visa not required	3 months	
Bahrain	Visa on arrival	3 months	
Bangladesh	Visa on arrival	30 days	
Barbados	Visa not required	6 months	
Belarus	Visa required		Visas are issued on arrival at the Minsk International Airport if the support documents were submitted not later than 3 business days before expected date of arrival.
Belgium	Visa not required	90 days	90 days within any 180 day period in the Schengen Area
Belize	Visa not required	1 month	
Benin	eVisa	30 days	
Bhutan	Visa required		Pre-approved visa can be picked up on arrival.
Bolivia	Visa not required	90 days	
Bosnia and Herzegovina	Visa not required	90 days	
Botswana	Visa not required	90 days	
Brazil	Visa not required	90 days	
Brunei	Visa required		
Bulgaria	Visa not required	90 days	90 days within any 180 day period
Burkina Faso	Visa on arrival	1 month	
Burundi	Visa required		
Cambodia	Visa on arrival	30 days	Visa is also obtainable online.
Cameroon	Visa required		Pre-approved visa can be picked up on arrival.
Canada	Visa not required	6 months	Visa Free Access only to BOCs with right of abode in the UK. ETA required if arriving by air. Not applicable to BOCs with indefinite leave to remain in the UK.
Cape Verde	Visa on arrival		
Central African Republic	Visa required		
Chad	Visa required		
Chile	Visa not required	90 days	Extension of stay possible for additional 90 days.
People's Republic of China	Visa required		
Republic of China	Visa required		
Colombia	Visa not required	180 days	
Comoros	Visa on arrival		
Republic of the Congo	Visa required		
Democratic Republic of the Congo	Visa required		
Costa Rica	Visa required		
Croatia	Visa not required	90 days	90 days within any 180 day period
Cuba	Tourist Card required		
Cyprus	Visa not required	90 days	90 days within any 180 day period
Czech Republic	Visa not required	90 days	90 days within any 180 day period in the Schengen Area
Denmark	Visa not required	90 days	90 days within any 180 day period in the Schengen Area (DK)
Djibouti	Visa on arrival		
Dominica	Visa not required	6 months	
Dominican Republic	Visa required		
Ecuador	Visa not required	90 days	
Egypt	Visa on arrival	30 days	
El Salvador	Visa required		
Equatorial Guinea	Visa required		
Eritrea	Visa required		Pre-approved visa can be picked up on arrival.
Estonia	Visa not required	90 days	90 days within any 180 day period in the Schengen Area
Eswatini	Visa not required	30 days	
Ethiopia	eVisa / Visa on arrival		
Fiji	Visa not required	4 months	
Finland	Visa not required	90 days	90 days within any 180 day period in the Schengen Area
France	Visa not required	90 days	90 days within any 180 day period in the Schengen Area (in Regions of France)
Gabon	Visa required		Pre-approved visa can be picked up on arrival.
Gambia	Visa not required	90 days	
Georgia	eVisa		
Germany	Visa not required	90 days	90 days within any 180 day period in the Schengen Area
Ghana	Visa required		Pre-approved visa can be picked up on arrival.
Greece	Visa not required	90 days	90 days within any 180 day period in the Schengen Area
Grenada	Visa not required	6 months	Beginning on 1 December 2020, all travellers to Grenada will be required to complete an online application in order to receive a Pure Safe Travel Authorization Certificate to enter Grenada.
Guatemala	Visa required		
Guinea	Visa required		
Guinea-Bissau	Visa on arrival	90 days	
Guyana	Visa required		
Haiti	Visa not required	90 days	
Honduras	Visa required		
Hungary	Visa not required	90 days	90 days within any 180 day period in the Schengen Area
Iceland	Visa not required	90 days	90 days within any 180 day period in the Schengen Area
India	Visa required		
Indonesia	Visa required		
Iran	Visa required		
Iraq	Visa required		Visa on arrival for 15 days at Erbil and Sulaymaniyah airports.
Ireland	Visa not required		
Israel	Visa not required	3 months	
Italy	Visa not required	90 days	90 days within any 180 day period in the Schengen Area
Côte d'Ivoire	eVisa	3 months	eVisa holders must arrive via Port Bouet Airport.
Jamaica	Visa not required	30 days	
Japan	Visa required		
Jordan	Visa on arrival		Conditions apply
Kazakhstan	Visa not required		
Kenya	Visa on arrival	3 months	
Kiribati	Visa required		
North Korea	Visa required		
South Korea	K-ETA required	30 days	British Overseas citizens can enter South Korea as a short term visit (e.g., tours, visiting relatives or friends, attending simple meetings) up to 90 days without a visa, though you should remain aware of the quarantine requirements. You must also have an onward or return ticket. It is illegal to work on a tourist visa, whether as a teacher or in any other capacity.; You must be in possession of a Korea Electronic Travel Authorization (K-ETA) to enter Korea visa-free. You can complete your K-ETA application up to 24 hours before boarding your flight and it will be valid for two years from the date of approval. There is a small, non-refundable charge.
Kuwait	Visa on arrival	3 months	
Kyrgyzstan	eVisa		
Laos	Visa on arrival	30 days	
Latvia	Visa not required	90 days	90 days within any 180 day period in the Schengen Area
Lebanon	Visa required		
Lesotho	Visa not required	14 days	
Liberia	Visa required		Pre-approved visa can be picked up on arrival.
Libya	Visa required		Pre-approved visa can be picked up on arrival.
Liechtenstein	Visa not required	90 days	90 days within any 180 day period in the Schengen Area
Lithuania	Visa not required	90 days	90 days within any 180 day period in the Schengen Area
Luxembourg	Visa not required	90 days	90 days within any 180 day period in the Schengen Area
Madagascar	Visa on arrival	90 days	
Malawi	Visa required		
Malaysia	Visa not required	3 months	
Maldives	Visa on arrival	30 days	
Mali	Visa required		
Malta	Visa not required	90 days	90 days within any 180 day period in the Schengen Area
Marshall Islands	Visa required		
Mauritania	Visa on arrival		Available at Nouakchott–Oumtounsy International Airport.
Mauritius	Visa not required	90 days	
Mexico	Visa required		
Micronesia	Visa not required	30 days	
Moldova	Visa not required	90 days	90 days within any 180 day period
Monaco	Visa not required		
Mongolia	Visa required		
Montenegro	Visa required		
Morocco	Visa required		
Mozambique	Visa on arrival		
Myanmar	eVisa	28 days	eVisa holders must arrive via Yangon International Airport.; Also visa on arrival for 28 days, if arriving from Siem Reap, Guangzhou or Phnom Penh on MAI.
Namibia	Visa not required	3 months	
Nauru	Visa required		
Nepal	Visa on arrival	90 days	
Netherlands	Visa not required	90 days	90 days within any 180 day period in the Schengen Area (European Netherlands)
New Zealand	Visa required		May enter using eGate.; Holders of a British non-citizen passport who can provide evidence of the right to reside permanently in the United Kingdom may be granted a Visitor Visa current for six months on arrival, subject to meeting character requirements and providing that the purposes of the visit do not include medical consultation or treatment. Electronic Travel Authority must be obtained prior to departure.; Holders of an Australian Permanent Resident Visa or Resident Return Visa may be granted a New Zealand Resident Visa on arrival permitting indefinite stay (pursuant to the Trans-Tasman Travel Arrangement), subject to meeting character requirements and obtaining an Electronic Travel Authority prior to departure.
Nicaragua	Visa not required	90 days	
Niger	Visa required		
Nigeria	Visa required		Pre-approved visa can be picked up on arrival.
North Macedonia	Visa required	90 days	
Norway	Visa not required	90 days	90 days within any 180 day period in the Schengen Area
Oman	Visa on arrival	3 months	
Pakistan	Visa required		
Palau	Visa on arrival	30 days	
Panama	Visa not required	180 days	
Papua New Guinea	Visa required		
Paraguay	Visa not required	90 days	
Peru	Visa not required	183 days	
Philippines	Visa not required	7 days	
Poland	Visa not required	90 days	90 days within any 180 day period in the Schengen Area
Portugal	Visa not required	90 days	90 days within any 180 day period in the Schengen Area
Qatar	Free visa on arrival	30 days	Available at Hamad International Airport.; eVisa is also available.
Romania	Visa not required	90 days	90 days within any 180 day period
Russia	Visa required		72-hour Visa on arrival in Kaliningrad if traveling as part of a tour group organized by an authorized travel agent.
Rwanda	Visa not required	90 days	
Saint Kitts and Nevis	Visa not required	3 months	
Saint Lucia	Visa not required	6 weeks	
Saint Vincent and the Grenadines	Visa not required	1 month	
Samoa	Free Entry Permit on arrival	60 days	Free of charge.
San Marino	Visa not required		
São Tomé and Príncipe	eVisa		
Saudi Arabia	Visa required		
Senegal	eVisa	3 months	
Serbia	Visa not required	90 days	
Seychelles	Free Visitor's Permit on arrival	3 months	Free of charge.
Sierra Leone	Visa required		Pre-approved visa can be picked up on arrival.
Singapore	Visa not required	30 days	
Slovakia	Visa not required	90 days	90 days within any 180 day period in the Schengen Area
Slovenia	Visa not required	90 days	90 days within any 180 day period in the Schengen Area
Solomon Islands	Free Visitor's permit on arrival	3 months	Free of charge.
Somalia	Visa on arrival		Available at Berbera, Borama, Burao, Erigavo and Hargeisa airports.; 30 days, available at Bosaso Airport, Galcaio Airport and Mogadishu Airport.
South Africa	Visa required		
South Sudan	Visa required		
Spain	Visa not required	90 days	90 days within any 180 day period in the Schengen Area
Sri Lanka	Electronic Travel Authorization	30 days	
Sudan	Visa required		
Suriname	Visa not required	90 days	An entrance fee of 25 USD or 25 Euros must be paid online prior to arrival.; Multiple entry eVisa is also available.
Sweden	Visa not required	90 days	90 days within any 180 day period in the Schengen Area
Switzerland	Visa not required	90 days	90 days within any 180 day period in the Schengen Area
Syria	Visa required		
Tajikistan	Visa required		
Tanzania	Visa on arrival		
Thailand	Visa required		
Timor-Leste	Visa on arrival	30 days	Not available at all entry points.
Togo	Visa on arrival	7 days	
Tonga	Free visa on arrival	31 days	Free of charge.
Trinidad and Tobago	Visa not required	30 days	
Tunisia	Visa not required	3 months	
Turkey	Visa required		
Turkmenistan	Visa required		Pre-approved visa can be picked up on arrival.
Tuvalu	Free visa on arrival	1 month	Free of charge.
Uganda	Visa on arrival		May apply online.
Ukraine	Visa required		
United Arab Emirates	Visa required		
United Kingdom	Visa not required	6 months	
United States	Visa required		
Uruguay	Visa not required	90 days	
Uzbekistan	eVisa	30 days	Pre-approved visa can be picked up on arrival.
Vanuatu	Visa not required	30 days	
Vatican City	Visa not required		
Venezuela	Visa not required	90 days	
Vietnam	eVisa		A single entry eVisa valid for 30 days is available.
Yemen	Visa required		
Zambia	Visa on arrival	90 days	
Zimbabwe	Visa on arrival	3 months	

== British Crown Dependencies and Overseas Territories ==
British Crown Dependencies and Overseas Territories
Visitor to	Visa requirement	Allowed stay	Notes
Ascension Island	eVisa	3 months	3 months within any year period
Anguilla	Visa not required	3 months	British Overseas citizens with a connection to the territory have right of abode.
Bermuda	Visa not required	6 months	British Overseas citizens with a connection to the territory have right of abode.
British Antarctic Territory	Special permit required		
British Indian Ocean Territory	Special permit required		
British Virgin Islands	Visa not required	1 month	Extension of stay possible.; British Overseas citizens with a connection to the territory have right of abode.
Cayman Islands	Visa not required	30 Days	The passenger must arrive directly from the United Kingdom.; British Overseas citizens with a connection to the territory have right of abode.
Falkland Islands	Visitor's permit on arrival	4 weeks	The initial visitor's permit is valid for 4 weeks.; Visitors who have a connection with the Falkland Islands have right of abode.
Guernsey	Visa not required		
Isle of Man	Visa not required		Work or employment permit is required for persons without "Isle of Man worker" status.
Jersey	Visa not required		Work or employment permit is required.
Gibraltar	Visa not required		
Montserrat	Visa not required	6 months	British Overseas citizens with a connection to the territory have right of abode.
Pitcairn Islands	Visa not required	14 days	Landing fee applies.
Saint Helena	Entry permit on arrival	183 days	The entry permit costs £25 and is issued on arrival.
South Georgia and the South Sandwich Islands	Permit required		Pre-arrival permit from the Commissioner required (72 hours/1 month for 110/160 pounds sterling).
Turks and Caicos Islands	Visa not required	90 days	British Overseas citizens with a connection to the territory have right of abode.
Tristan da Cunha	Permission required		Permission to land required for 15/30 pounds sterling (yacht/ship passenger) for Tristan da Cunha Island or 20 pounds sterling for Gough Island, Inaccessible Island or Nightingale Islands, unless connection with Tristan da Cunha, in which case right of abode.

== Territories ==
Europe
Visitor to	Visa requirement	Notes (excluding departure fees)
Abkhazia	Visa required	
Mount Athos	Special permit required	Special permit required (4 days: 25 euro for Orthodox visitors, 35 euro for non-Orthodox visitors, 18 euro for students). There is a visitors' quota: maximum 100 Orthodox and 10 non-Orthodox per day and women are not allowed.
(Belarus) Belovezhskaya Pushcha National Park	Visa not required	3 days; must first obtain an electronic pass
(Autonomous Republic of Crimea) Crimea	Visa required	Visa policy of Russia applies de facto.
Turkish Republic of Northern Cyprus	Visa not required	3 months
(United Nations) UN Buffer Zone in Cyprus	Access Permit required	Access Permit is required for travelling inside the zone, except Civil Use Areas.
Faroe Islands	Visa not required	
(Norway) Jan Mayen	Permit required	Permit issued by the local police required for staying for less than 24 hours and permit issued by the Norwegian police for staying for more than 24 hours.
Jersey	Visa not required	
Kosovo	Visa not required	90 days
Novorossiya	Restricted area	Crossing from Ukraine requires visit purpose to be explained to Ukrainian passport control on exit and those who entered from Russia are not allowed to proceed further into Ukraine.
Russia	Special authorization required	Several closed cities and regions in Russia require special authorization.
South Ossetia	Visa not required	Multiple entry visa to Russia and three-day prior notification are required to enter South Ossetia.
Transnistria	Visa not required	Registration required after 24h.
Africa
Visitor to	Visa requirement	Notes (excluding departure fees)
Eritrea outside Asmara	Travel permit required	To travel in the rest of the country, a Travel Permit for Foreigners is required (20 Eritrean nakfa).
Mayotte	Visa not required	90 days
Réunion	Visa not required	90 days
Sahrawi Arab Democratic Republic		Visa not required up to 3 months.
Somaliland	Visa on arrival	30 days for 30 US dollars, payable on arrival.
Sudan	Travel permit required	All foreigners traveling more than 25 kilometers outside of Khartoum must obtain a travel permit.
(Sudan) Darfur	Travel permit required	Separate travel permit is required.
Asia
Visitor to	Visa requirement	Notes (excluding departure fees)
Hong Kong	Visa not required	3 months Prior to April 1997, British Overseas citizens were allowed to land and remain in Hong Kong for 12 months without being subject to any other condition of stay.
India PAP/RAP	PAP/RAP required	Protected Area Permit (PAP) required for whole states of Nagaland and Sikkim and parts of states Manipur, Arunachal Pradesh, Uttaranchal, Jammu and Kashmir, Rajasthan, Himachal Pradesh. Restricted Area Permit (RAP) required for all of Andaman and Nicobar Islands and parts of Sikkim. Some of these requirements are occasionally lifted for a year.
Iraqi Kurdistan	Visa on arrival	15 days
Kazakhstan	Special permission required	Special permission required for the town of Baikonur and surrounding areas in Kyzylorda Oblast, and the town of Gvardeyskiy near Almaty.
(Iran) Kish Island	Visa not required	Visitors to Kish Island do not require a visa.
Macao	Visa not required	6 months
(Malaysia) Sabah and Sarawak	Visa not required	These states have their own immigration authorities and passport is required to travel to them, however the same visa applies.
Maldives	Permission required	With the exception of the capital Malé, tourists are generally prohibited from visiting non-resort islands without the express permission of the Government of Maldives.
North Korea outside Pyongyang	Special permit required	People are not allowed to leave the capital city, tourists can only leave the capital with a governmental tourist guide (no independent moving)
Palestine	Visa not required	Arrival by sea to Gaza Strip not allowed.
Taiwan	Visa required	
(Tajikistan) Gorno-Badakhshan Autonomous Province	OIVR permit required	OIVR permit required (15+5 Tajikistani Somoni) and another special permit (free of charge) is required for Lake Sarez.
Turkmenistan	Special permit required	A special permit, issued prior to arrival by Ministry of Foreign Affairs, is required if visiting the following places: Atamurat, Cheleken, Dashoguz, Serakhs and Serhetabat.
(United Nations) Korean Demilitarized Zone	Restricted zone	
(United Nations) UNDOF Zone and Ghajar	Restricted zone	
(Vietnam) Phú Quốc	Visa not required	Can visit without a visa for up to 30 days.
Yemen	Special permission required	Special permission needed for travel outside Sanaa or Aden.
Caribbean and North Atlantic
Visitor to	Visa requirement	Notes (excluding departure fees)f
Aruba	Visa not required	30 days, extendable to 180 days
(Netherlands) Bonaire, St. Eustatius and Saba	Visa not required	90 days
(Colombia) San Andrés and Leticia	Tourist Card on arrival	Visitors arriving at Gustavo Rojas Pinilla International Airport and Alfredo Vásquez Cobo International Airport must buy tourist cards on arrival.
Curacao	Visa not required	3 months
(France) French Guiana	Visa not required	90 days
(France) French West Indies	Visa not required	90 days. French West Indies refers to Martinique, Guadeloupe, Saint Martin and Saint Barthélemy.
Greenland	Visa not required	
(Venezuela) Margarita Island	Visa not required	All visitors are fingerprinted.
Puerto Rico	Visa required	
Saint Pierre and Miquelon	Visa not required	
Sint Maarten	Visa not required	3 months
U.S. Virgin Islands	Visa required	
Oceania
Visitor to	Visa requirement	Notes (excluding departure fees)
American Samoa	Visa required	
(Australia) Ashmore and Cartier Islands	Special authorisation required	Special authorisation required.
(France) Clipperton Island	Special permit required	Special permit required.
Cook Islands	Visa not required	31 days
(Fiji) Lau Province	Special permission required	Special permission required.
French Polynesia	Visa not required	90 days
Guam	Visa not required	Visa not required under the Guam - CNMI Visa Waiver Program, for 45 days. Must also present a Hong Kong identity card.
New Caledonia	Visa not required	90 days
Niue	Visa on arrival	30 days
Northern Mariana Islands	Visa not required	Visa not required under the Guam - CNMI Visa Waiver Program, for 45 days. Must also present a Hong Kong identity card.
United States Minor Outlying Islands	Special permit required	Special permits required for Baker Island, Howland Island, Jarvis Island, Johnston Atoll, Kingman Reef, Midway Atoll, Palmyra Atoll and Wake Island.
Wallis and Futuna	Visa not required	90 days
South America
Visitor to	Visa requirement	Notes (excluding departure fees)
Galápagos	Pre-registration required	Online pre-registration is required. Transit Control Card must also be obtained at the airport prior to departure.
South Atlantic and Antarctica
Visitor to	Visa requirement	Notes (excluding departure fees)
Antarctica		Special permits required for French Southern and Antarctic Lands, Argentine Antarctica, (Australia) Australian Antarctic Territory, Bouvet Island, (Antártica Chilena Province) Chilean Antarctic Territory, (Australia) Heard Island and McDonald Islands, (Norway) Peter I Island, (Norway) Queen Maud Land, (New Zealand) Ross Dependency.

== Right to consular protection ==
Diplomatic missions of the United Kingdom

When in a country where there is no British embassy, British Overseas citizens have the right to get consular protection from the embassy of any other commonwealth country present in that country.

See also List of diplomatic missions of the United Kingdom.

== Non-visa restrictions ==
=== Blank passport pages ===
Many countries require a minimum number of blank pages to be available in the passport being presented, typically one or two pages. Endorsement pages, which often appear after the visa pages, are not counted as being valid or available.

=== Vaccination ===
Cover of the new International Certificate of Vaccination issued by the Bureau of Quarantine in the Philippines since 2021

The African countries of Angola, Benin, Burkina Faso, Burundi, Cameroon, Central African Republic, Democratic Republic of the Congo, Republic of the Congo, Côte d'Ivoire, Gabon, Ghana, Guinea-Bissau, Mali, Niger, Sierra Leone and Togo, South Sudan and Uganda, along with French Guiana in South America, require all incoming passengers older than nine months to one year, to have a current International Certificate of Vaccination or Prophylaxis.

Some other countries require vaccination only if the passenger is coming from an infected area or has visited one recently or has transited for 12 hours in those countries: Algeria, Botswana, Cabo Verde, Chad, Djibouti, Egypt, Eswatini, Ethiopia, Gambia, Ghana, Guinea, Lesotho, Libya, Equatorial Guinea, Eritrea, Madagascar, Malawi, Mauritania, Mauritius, Mozambique, Namibia, Nigeria, Papua New Guinea, Seychelles, Somalia, South Africa, Sudan, Tunisia, Uganda, Tanzania, Zambia and Zimbabwe.

=== Passport validity length ===
Very few countries, such as Paraguay, just require a valid passport on arrival.

However many countries and groupings now require only an identity card – especially from their neighbours. Other countries may have special bilateral arrangements that depart from the generality of their passport validity length policies to shorten the period of passport validity required for each other's citizens or even accept passports that have already expired (but not been cancelled).

Some countries, such as Japan, Ireland and the United Kingdom, require a passport valid throughout the period of the intended stay.

In the absence of specific bilateral agreements, countries requiring passports to be valid for at least 6 more months on arrival include Afghanistan, Algeria, Anguilla, Bahrain, Bhutan, Botswana, British Virgin Islands, Brunei, Cambodia, Cameroon, Cape Verde, Cayman Islands, Central African Republic, Chad, Comoros, Costa Rica, Côte d'Ivoire, Curaçao, Ecuador, Egypt, El Salvador, Equatorial Guinea, Fiji, Gabon, Guinea Bissau, Guyana, Haiti, India, Indonesia, Iran, Iraq, Israel, Jordan, Kenya, Kiribati, Kuwait, Laos, Madagascar, Malaysia, Marshall Islands, Mongolia, Myanmar, Namibia, Nepal, Nicaragua, Nigeria, Oman, Palau, Papua New Guinea, Peru, Philippines, Qatar, Rwanda, Samoa, Saudi Arabia, Singapore, Solomon Islands, Somalia, Sri Lanka, Sudan, Suriname, Tanzania, Thailand, Timor-Leste, Tokelau, Tonga, Turkey, Tuvalu, Uganda, United Arab Emirates, Vanuatu, Venezuela, and Vietnam.

Countries requiring passports valid for at least 4 months on arrival include Micronesia and Zambia.

Countries requiring passports with a validity of at least 3 months beyond the date of intended departure include Azerbaijan, Bosnia and Herzegovina, Honduras, Montenegro, Nauru, Moldova and New Zealand. Similarly, the EEA countries of Iceland, Liechtenstein, Norway, all European Union countries (except Ireland) together with Switzerland also require 3 months validity beyond the date of the bearer's intended departure unless the bearer is an EEA or Swiss national.

Countries requiring passports valid for at least 3 months on arrival include Albania, North Macedonia, Panama, and Senegal.

Bermuda requires passports to be valid for at least 45 days upon entry.

Countries that require a passport validity of at least one month beyond the date of intended departure include Eritrea, Hong Kong, Lebanon, Macau, the Maldives and South Africa.

==== Maximum passport age ====
Countries of the Schengen area require non-EU passports to be less than 10 years old upon entry.

=== Criminal record ===
Some countries, including Australia, Canada, Fiji, New Zealand and the United States, routinely deny entry to non-citizens who have a criminal record, while others impose restrictions depending on the type of conviction and the length of the sentence.

=== Persona non grata ===
The government of a country can declare a diplomat persona non grata, banning them from entering the country or expelling them if they have already entered. In non-diplomatic use, the authorities of a country may also declare a foreigner persona non grata permanently or temporarily, usually because of unlawful activity.

=== Israeli stamps ===
Kuwait, Lebanon, Libya, and Yemen do not allow entry to people with passport stamps from Israel or whose passports have either a used or an unused Israeli visa, or where there is evidence of previous travel to Israel such as entry or exit stamps from neighbouring border posts in transit countries such as Jordan and Egypt.

To circumvent this Arab League boycott of Israel, the Israeli immigration services have now mostly ceased to stamp foreign nationals' passports on either entry to or exit from Israel (unless the entry is for some work-related purposes). Since 15 January 2013, Israel no longer stamps foreign passports at Ben Gurion Airport. Passports are still (as of 22 June 2017) stamped at Erez when passing into and out of Gaza.

Iran refuses admission to holders of passports containing an Israeli visa or stamp that is less than 12 months old.

=== Biometrics ===
Several countries mandate that all travellers, or all foreign travellers, be fingerprinted on arrival and will refuse admission to or even arrest travellers who refuse to comply. In some countries, such as the United States, this may apply even to transit passengers who merely wish to change planes rather than go landside.

Fingerprinting countries/regions include Afghanistan, Argentina, Brunei, Cambodia, China, Ethiopia, Ghana, Guinea, India, Japan, Kenya (both fingerprints and a photo are taken), Malaysia upon entry and departure, Mongolia, Saudi Arabia, the Schengen Area, Singapore, South Korea, Taiwan, Thailand, Uganda, the United Arab Emirates and the United States.

Many countries also require a photo be taken of people entering the country. The United States, which does not fully implement exit control formalities at its land frontiers (although long mandated by its own legislation), intends to implement facial recognition for passengers departing from international airports to identify people who overstay their visa.

Together with fingerprint and face recognition, iris scanning is one of three biometric identification technologies internationally standardised since 2006 by the International Civil Aviation Organization (ICAO) for use in e-passports and the United Arab Emirates conducts iris scanning on visitors who need to apply for a visa. The United States Department of Homeland Security has announced plans to greatly increase the biometric data it collects at US borders. In 2018, Singapore began trials of iris scanning at three land and maritime immigration checkpoints.

== Foreign travel statistics ==
According to the Foreign travel advice provided by the British Government (unless otherwise noted) these are the numbers of British visitors to various countries per annum in 2015 (unless otherwise noted):

Foreign travel statistics

Country	Number of visitors	Lost or stolen passports
Albania (Note: Data for 2014)	80,000	
American Samoa (Note: Data for 2017)	119	
Angola (Note: Data for 2015)	14,267/12,319 ?	
Andorra (Note: Data for 2016)	150,000	
Anguilla	5,021	
Antarctica	3,915	
Antigua and Barbuda	70,701	
Aruba	10,447	
Australia	731,900	640
Austria (Note: Counting only guests in tourist accommodation establishments.)	919,500	
Azerbaijan	29,514	
Bahamas	28,022	
Bangladesh	150,000	
Barbados	218,638	
Belarus	6,000	
Belgium	868,173	
Belize	13,342	
Bermuda	41,348	
Bhutan	3,246	
Bolivia	17,528	
Bosnia and Herzegovina	12,715	
Botswana	41,011	
Brazil	185,858	
Brunei (Note: Data for 2011)	18,222	
Bulgaria (Note: Data for 2018)	424,384	
Burkina Faso	1,343	
Cambodia	159,489	
Cameroon	16,008	
Canada	819,530	
Cape Verde	126,685	
Cayman Islands (Note: Data for arrivals by air only.)	14,017	
Chile	54,714	
China	594,300	
Colombia	39,715	
Congo (Note: Data for 2012)	6,115	
Cook Islands	2,954	
Costa Rica	76,173	
Croatia	750,675	
Cuba	155,802	
Curacao	2,806	
Cyprus	1,327,805	
Czech Republic	470,576	
Denmark	150,000	
Dominica	4,951	
Dominican Republic	177,534	
Ecuador	27,126	
Egypt	865,000	
Ethiopia	20,000	
Estonia	58,402	
Eswatini	15,503	
Fiji	16,925	
Finland	232,071	
France	12,235,713	1,344
French Polynesia	2,840	
Gambia	60,424	
Ghana	90,000	
Georgia	29,406	
Germany	2,551,061	606
Greece	2,397,169	
Greenland	1,595	
Grenada	25,351	
Guadeloupe	<1,000	
Hong Kong	555,353	
Hungary	376,573	
Iceland	297,963	
Indonesia	352,017	
India	986,296	
Ireland	3,547,000	
Israel	198,500	
Italy	4,922,000	737
Jamaica	217,647	
Japan	310,500	
Jordan	64,776	
Kazakhstan	21,341	
Kiribati	173	
Kuwait	7,000	
Kenya	100,000	
Kyrgyzstan	6,900	
Laos	27,723	
Latvia	95,357	
Lebanon	61,994	
Lesotho (Note: Data for 2013)	2,380	
Liechtenstein	2,200	
Lithuania	58,200	
Luxembourg	69,350	
Macau	57,121	
Madagascar	3,167	
Malaysia	358,818	
Malawi (Note: Data for 2009)	51,145	
Maldives	103,977	
Malta	640,570	
Mali	900	
Marshall Islands	51	
Mauritius	149,807	
Mexico	563,099	
Moldova	11,555	
Mongolia	6,012	
Montenegro	37,464	
Montserrat (Note: Data for 2010)	1,380	
Morocco	554,000	
Myanmar	51,051	
Namibia	27,365	
Nepal	29,730	
New Caledonia	708	
Nigeria	117,000	
Niue	146	
North Macedonia	8,856	
Norway	581,000	
Netherlands	2,195,000	602
New Zealand	249,264	
Nicaragua	16,923	
Oman	143,224	
Pakistan	275,400	
Palau	852	
Panama	16,338	
Papua New Guinea	6,974	
Peru	69,506	
Philippines	182,708	
Poland	796,900	
Portugal	2,600,000	405
Qatar	120,495	
Romania (Note: Data for 2019)	243,991	
Russia	193,522	
Saba	200	
Saint Lucia	68,175	
Saint Vincent and the Grenadines	17,045	
Samoa	1,422	
San Marino	5,750	
São Tomé and Príncipe (Note: Data for 2005)	83	
Serbia	32,802	
Seychelles	21,906	
Singapore	518,903	
Sint Eustatius	200	
Slovakia	77,837	
Slovenia	118,508	
Solomon Islands	496	
South Africa	407,486	
South Korea	126,024	
Spain	18,502,722	5,605
Sri Lanka	201,879	
Suriname	1,077	
Switzerland	709,925	430
Sweden	603,000	
Taiwan	104,911	
Tanzania	67,742	
Thailand	994,468	603
Timor-Leste	1,253	
Tonga	1,102	
Trinidad and Tobago	37,473	
Turkey	2,254,871	
Turks and Caicos	6,399	
Tuvalu	59	
Uganda	43,009	
Uruguay	20,000	
Ukraine	78,603	
United Arab Emirates	1,265,000	
United States (Note: Total number includes tourists, business travelers, students, exchange visitors, temporary workers and families, diplomats and other representatives and all other classes of nonimmigrant admissions (I-94).)	5,076,167	1,539
Uzbekistan	1,800	
Venezuela	20,837	
Vietnam	283,537	
Zambia	36,997	

== See also ==
- British Overseas citizen
- British passport
- Visa requirements for British citizens
- Visa requirements for British Overseas Territories Citizens
- Visa requirements for British Nationals (Overseas)
