= Gvardeysky, Kazakhstan =

Gvardeyskiy Гвардейский
- Location in Kazakhstan
- Coordinates: 43°34′34″N 75°12′45″E
- Country: Kazakhstan
- Region: Almaty Region
- Time zone: UTC+6 (Omsk Time)

Gvardeyskiy is a settlement in Almaty Region, in south-eastern Kazakhstan.

As a military townlet (Otar Military Base) it is a closed area and for travelers, a special permission is required to visit the town. The town also hosts the Research Institute of Biological Safety Problems that specializes in pathogenic viruses.
