= Police raid =

Tactic used by police

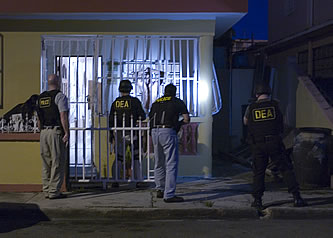
A raid conducted by U.S. Drug Enforcement Administration agents as part of Operation Mallorca in 2010

A police raid is an unexpected visit by police or other law enforcement officers, which aims to use the element of surprise to seize evidence or arrest suspects believed to be likely to hide evidence, resist arrest, endanger the public or officers if approached through other means, or simply be elsewhere at another time. Various tactics are used by law enforcement in raids that often vary based on available equipment, situational factors, laws, and police powers.

== Overview and methods ==
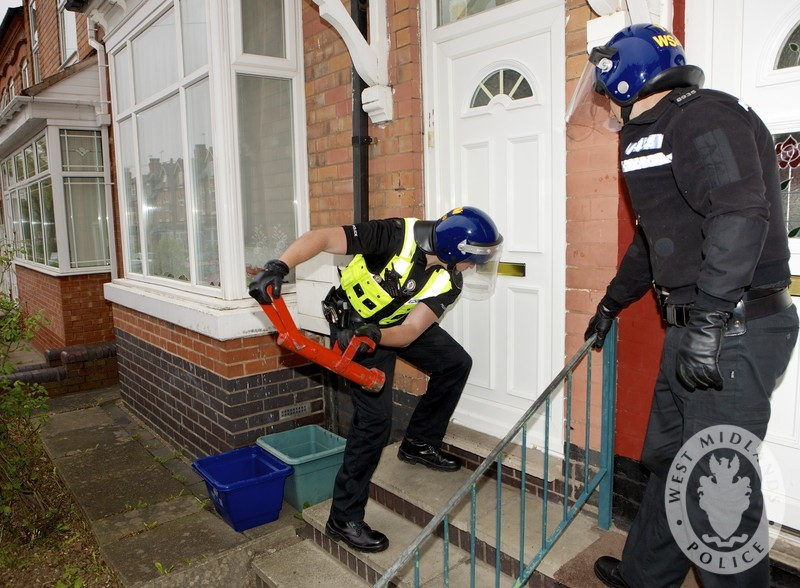
A British police officer of the West Midlands Police using an Enforcer battering ram to force entry during a dawn raid.

The U.S. Bureau of Alcohol, Tobacco, Firearms and Explosives (ATF) defines a police raid as "a sudden appearance by officers for the purpose of arresting suspected law violators and seizing contraband and the means and instruments used in the commission of a crime."

== By country ==
=== New Zealand ===
Dawn raids were a common event in Auckland, New Zealand, during a crackdown on illegal overstayers from the Pacific Islands from the mid-1970s to the early 1980s. The raids were first introduced in 1973 by Norman Kirk's Labour government and were continued by Robert Muldoon's National government. These operations involved special police squads conducting raids on the homes and workplaces of overstayers throughout New Zealand, usually at dawn. Overstayers and their families were often prosecuted and then deported back to their countries.

The Dawn raids were particularly controversial, because despite the fact that Pacific Islanders only made up one-third of visa over-stayers, they accounted for 86% of those arrested and prosecuted. The majority of over-stayers were from Great Britain, Australia, and South Africa. Due to opposition from the Pacific community including the Polynesian Panthers, the Labour Party, and Pacific governments, the raids were abandoned by the National Government.

In April 2021, members of the Pasifika community called for an official apology, describing the dawn raids as "government‑sanctioned racism". In mid-June 2021, Prime Minister Jacinda Ardern confirmed that the New Zealand Government would formally apologise for the Dawn Raids at the Auckland Town Hall on 26 June 2021.

=== United Kingdom ===
==== England and Wales ====
===== Politicians =====
- Ruth Turner

In January 2007 Ruth Turner was arrested in a dawn raid as part of the investigation into the Cash for Peerages affair. Senior Labour politicians criticised the move; but their concern about this has been contrasted by their lack of concern at other dawn raids.

===== Asylum seekers =====
- Manuelo Bravo

In September 2005, Manuelo Bravo killed himself following his arrest in a dawn raid. He and his son (13) were detained in Yarl's Wood Immigration Removal Centre where he had been threatened with deportation to Angola, where he feared his life was in danger as other family members had been killed there.

==== Scotland ====
===== Asylum-seekers =====
Dawn raids have become a regular feature in the arrest of asylum seekers in Scotland. These have caused a great deal of controversy and pressure has been brought to bear on the Scottish Executive to end the practise. Several support groups have been set up to oppose the practice of dawn raids, including the Glasgow Girls, the UNITY centre in Ibrox and No Border Network which campaigns under the slogan of "No one is illegal".

There has been speculation that the practice may be coming to an end for asylum seekers following criticisms from a wide range of people. On 1 February 2007 the deputy First Minister, Nichol Stephen condemned the practise of dawn raids describing them as "unacceptable and unnecessary." Some have speculated that this is part of a wider change in tactics on the issue of asylum, moving away from dawn raiding asylum seekers, to detaining families at reporting centres; however, dawn raids have continued.

- Ay family

In 2002, Yurdugal Ay and her children were suddenly removed from their home by immigration officials and taken to Dungavel detention centre in South Lanarkshire, Scotland. They were all put together in one room where they lived for a year.

- Vucaj family

In September 2005, Isen and Nexhi Vucaj were arrested in a dawn raid together with their three teenage children. They were taken to Yarl's Wood Immigration Removal Centre before being deported to Albania.

- Akyol family

On 8 February 2006, Lutfu and Gultan Akyol and their two children, aged 10 and 6, were arrested in a dawn raid after home office officials battered down their door. They were taken to Dungavel following the raid

- Sakchai Makao

In June 2006, Sakchai Makao, a 23-year-old man from Thailand, was arrested in a dawn raid in Lerwick. A third of the Shetland Island population signed a petition to have him released. He was eventually released two weeks later. The campaign to free him later won the Scottish politician of the year award.

- Temel family

On 12 July 2006, Servat and Sakine Temel and their three children were dawn raided and taken to England awaiting deportation to Turkey.

- Benai family

In September 2006, Azzadine Benai escaped during a dawn raid on his home which saw his wife and two children (11 and 2) detained, by jumping out of a first floor window as he feared he would be killed if he was returned to Algeria. After public outcry, his wife and children, both of whom require ongoing medical treatment, were released.

- Sony family

On 2 October 2006, Caritas Sony and her two children Heaven (2) and Glad (4 months) were arrested in a dawn raid. They were taken to Dungavel prior to intended deportation to the Democratic Republic of Congo, where Caritas had been raped and tortured before fleeing to the UK. After a strong campaign, Caritas and her family were eventually released.

- Uzun family

On 3 October 2006, the Uzun family managed to avoid being detained during a dawn raid, as they were absent at the time. They had gone to demonstrate solidarity with Caritas Sony.

- Coban family

On 4 October 2006, Cem and Betsy Coban together with their two children, aged 14 and 3, were detained following a dawn raid. Cem Cobain threatened to jump from the balcony of his 20th storey flat rather than be deported to an uncertain future in Turkey, but after 3 hours of negotiations with Strathclyde Police he was eventually led away by immigration officials. Betsy was taken to hospital with complications related to a heart condition.

- Waku family

On 19 March 2007, Max and Onoya Waku and their three children, aged 14, 11 and 4, were taken to Dungavel detention centre following a dawn raid by immigration officers. They were later released.

=== United States ===
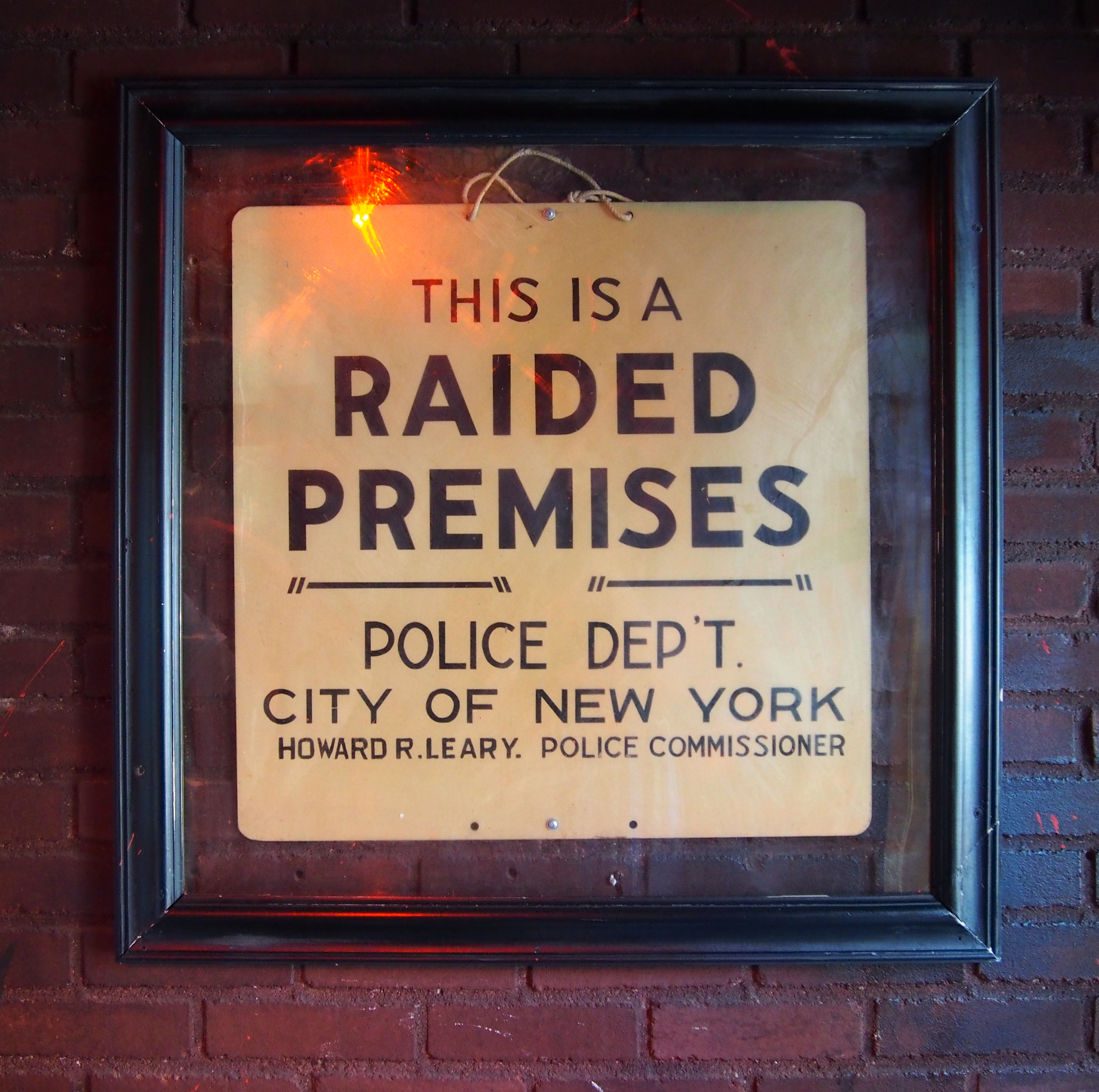
A 1969 raid at the Stonewall Inn sparked riots many viewed as the start of the gay liberation movement.

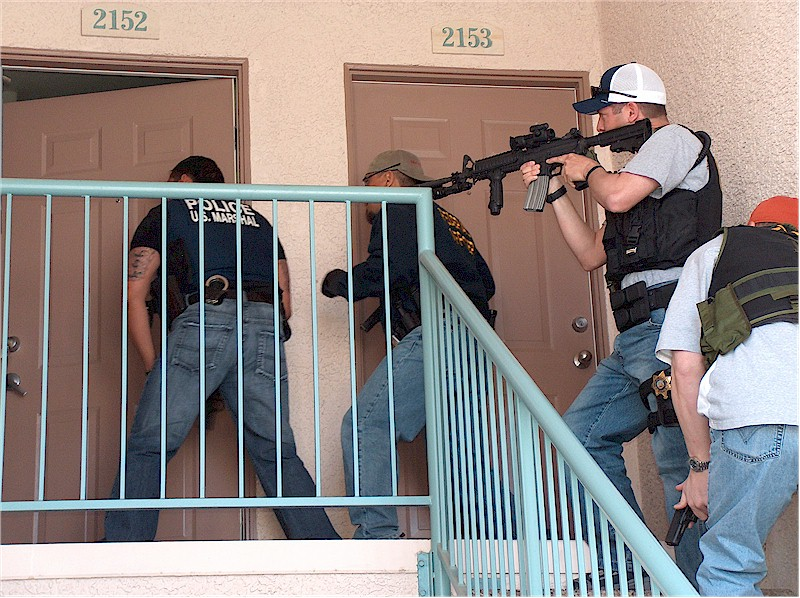
Police and U.S. Marshals in a raid

==== No-knock raid ====
A no-knock raid is a type of police raid performed under a no-knock warrant. No-knock warrants are controversial for various reasons, and have seen increased usage from the 1960s on. There have been many cases where armed homeowners, believing that they are being invaded, have shot at officers, resulting in deaths on both sides.

The number of no-knock raids has increased from 3,000 in 1981 to more than 50,000 in 2005, according to Peter Kraska, a criminologist at Eastern Kentucky University in Richmond. In 2010, Kraska estimated 60,000–70,000 no-knock or quick-knock raids were conducted by local police annually, the majority of which were looking for marijuana.

In Utah, no-knock warrants made up about 40% of warrants served by SWAT teams in 2014 and 2015, usually for drugs and usually done at night. In Maryland, 90% of SWAT deployments were to serve search warrants, with two-thirds through forced entry. From 2010 through 2016, at least 81 civilians and 13 officers died during SWAT raids, including 31 civilians and eight officers during execution of no-knock warrants. Half of the civilians killed were minorities. Of those subject to SWAT search warrants, 42% are black and 12% are Hispanic. Since 2011, at least seven federal lawsuits against officers executing no-knock warrants have been settled for over $1 million.

==== Dawn raids ====
Dawn raids are a tactic often used by law enforcement agencies in the United States. High-profile dawn raids include:

- the 22 April 2000, apprehension of Elián Gonzalez by a Border Patrol BORTAC team in Florida.
- the arrest of Rod Blagojevich on corruption charges
- the 2006 Swift raids at six meatpacking plants, leading to 1300 arrests and many deportations

=== The Netherlands ===
During the Nazi occupation of the Netherlands during World War II, the Nazis carried out numerous raids. The largest and most infamous is the Raid of Rotterdam on 10 and 11 November 1944, in which 52,000 men between the ages of 17 and 40 (some 80% of all men) from Rotterdam and Schiedam were rounded up and put on transport to labor camps.

== See also ==
- Dragnet (policing)
- Firing at a vehicle
- Unity (asylum seekers organisation)
