= Glasgow Girls (activists) =

Scottish human rights group

- Founded: 2005
- Type: Human rights group
- Purpose: Human rights Women's liberation
- Location: Glasgow, Scotland
- Key people: Amal Azzudin; Roza Salih; Agnesa Murselaj; Ewelina Siwak; Toni-Lee Henderson; Jennifer McCarron; Emma Clifford; Simerdeep Kaur; Euan Girvan

The Glasgow Girls is a group of seven young women in Glasgow, Scotland, who highlighted the poor treatment of asylum seekers whose rights of appeal had been exhausted. In 2005, the group campaigned against dawn raids, raised public awareness, and found support in the Scottish Parliament. Their story has been told in a musical and 2 documentaries.

== History ==
The group all attended Drumchapel High School in Glasgow and formed in 2005 with the support of their teacher Euan Girvan, in response to the detention of one of their friends, Agnesa Murselaj. The name came from two of its members, Amal Azzudin and Roza Salih. Pupils at the school signed a petition, then 26 MSPs signed a parliamentary motion praising the pupils' actions. By September 2005, their efforts had gained national attention. The girls challenged then First Minister Jack McConnell on the matter and publicly voiced their concerns as more children at their school were being dawn raided, detained and deported.

After visiting the Scottish Parliament twice, The Glasgow Girls obtained cross-party support on the issue.

The group won the Scottish Campaign of the Year Award in 2005 at the annual Scottish politician of the year ceremony for their hard work. However, it did not stop them from demanding to know just what had happened to the "protocol" that Jack McConnell had promised to obtain from the Home Office that social services, education services, and the Immigration police would be consulted before any decision was made on the removal of a family.

Two documentaries have been made by the BBC about their campaign- Tales from the Edge won the Nations and Regions Award in the Amnesty International UK Media Awards.

It took until September 2008 for the Murselaj family to be granted permanent leave to remain. Salih gained a place at Strathclyde University and studied law and politics. In 2014, the university announced scholarship funding for three asylum seekers to enable them to study there. Roza Salih stood for election as SNP candidate in several local and Scottish elections, and was elected as a Glasgow city councillor in 2022.

On 13 May 2021 Home Office Immigration Enforcement detained two men believed to be asylum seekers in Pollokshields, on the south side of Glasgow, and put them in their van. Police were in attendance, saying that they were there to maintain order, not assist in the detentions. The No Evictions Network (a campaign organizing to support people in asylum accommodation in Glasgow against evictions) called people in the same way as had been done in 2005, and a large crowd of ultimately hundreds of people, including Glasgow Girl Roza Salih, surrounded the van and prevented it from leaving. Eventually, the detained men were released.

== Depiction in popular culture ==
In 2012, the National Theatre of Scotland presented a modern musical at the Citizens Theatre in Glasgow depicting the life of the Glasgow Girls. The musical then had a run at Stratford East Theatre in London and returned to the Citizens in 2014 as part of the Glasgow 2014 Cultural Programme. Songs for the musical were written by Glaswegian musical artist Soom T.

BBC Scotland created a new musical television drama which aired on BBC Three on 15 July 2014. It won an award for drama at the Royal Television Society Scotland Awards 2014 and best TV drama at the BAFTA Scotland awards in November 2015.

== See also ==
- Dungavel
- Immigration
- Scottish Refugee Council
- UNITY (asylum seekers organisation)
- United Refugee Organization
