= No Border network =

Associations of free movement

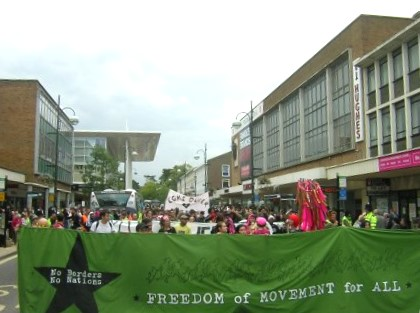
Demonstration during the No Borders Camp in Crawley, United Kingdom, 2007

The No Border Network (In the United Kingdom also called "No Borders Network" or "Noborders Network") refers to loose associations of anarchist and autonomous organisations, groups, and individuals in Europe and beyond. They support freedom of movement and resist human migration control by coordinating international border camps, demonstrations, direct actions, and anti-deportation campaigns.

The Western European network opposes what it says are increasingly restrictive harmonisation of asylum and immigration policy in Europe, and aims to build alliances among migrant laborers and refugees. Common slogans used by the Network include; "No Border, No Nation, Stop Deportations!" and "No one is illegal."

No Border Network has existed since 1999, and its website since 2000. The No Borders Network in the United Kingdom claims to have local groups in 11 cities. The history of this network is linked to the broader history of the anarchist movement in the late 20th and early 21st centuries.

== No Border Camps ==
Groups from the No Border network have been involved in organising a number of protest camps (called "No Border Camps" or sometimes "Border Camps" or "Transborder Camps"), e.g. in Strasbourg, France (2002), Otranto, Italy (2003), Cologne (2003, 2012), Gatwick Airport (2007), United Kingdom, at Patras, Greece, Dikili, Turkey (2008), Calais, France (2009, 2015), Lesvos, Greece (2009), Brussels, Belgium (2010), Siva Reka, Bulgaria (2011), Stockholm, Sweden (2012), Rotterdam, the Netherlands (2013), Ventimiglia, Italy (2015), Thessaloniki, Greece (2016), near Nantes, France (2019) in Wassenaar, Netherlands (2019), near Nantes, France (2022), and in Rotterdam, Netherlands (2022).

== Activities ==
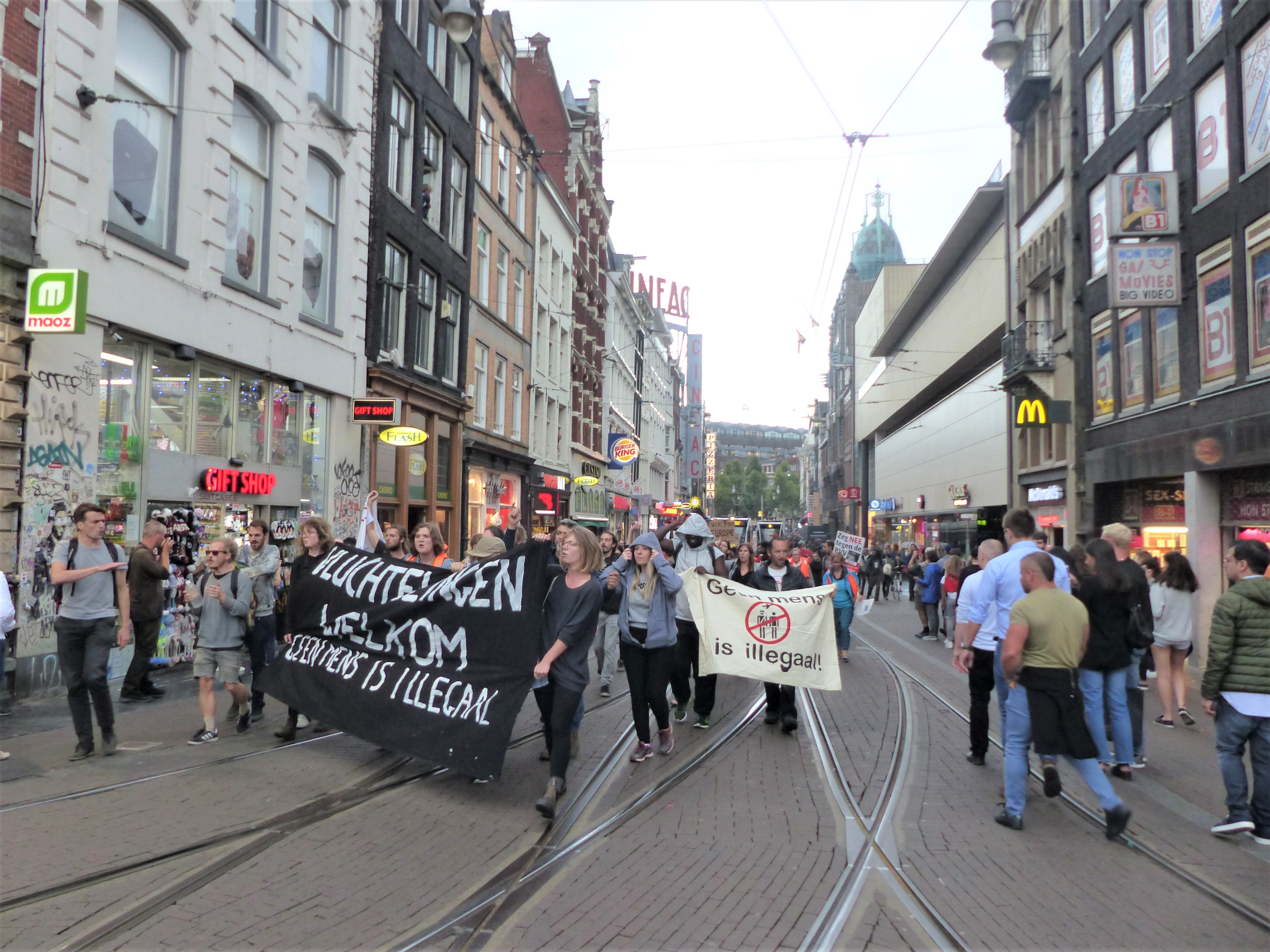
No Border demonstration, August 2018 in Amsterdam

On 18 December 2007, to coincide with the UN International Migrants Day, the network carried out a coordinated blockade of Border and Immigration Agency (now UK Border Agency) offices in Bristol, Portsmouth, Newcastle and Glasgow to prevent dawn raids by immigration officers from taking place. This form of action has been repeated across the UK by the network several times since.

On 24 October 2008, Phil Woolas, UK Minister of State for Borders and Immigration was pied by No Borders activists following his remarks on population control.

On 10 August 2013, No Border groups from The Netherlands squatted a large terrain at Rotterdam to gather and held several demonstrations.

In February 2010 No Borders groups from the UK and France opened a large centre for refugees sleeping rough in Calais, France, under the name "Kronstadt Hangar".

Calais authorities have accused "extremist activists" within to the No Borders network of being "driven by an anarchist ideology of hatred of all laws and frontiers" and engaging in, and encouraging, violence and harassment against French police and social workers at the Calais Jungle migrant camp, as well as "manipulating" and "misleading" the migrants living there.

After the intercultural philosophy journal "polylog" demanded in connection with the book "Global Freedom of Movement: A Philosophical Plea for Open Borders" that the "debate on freedom of migration or restrictions on immigration should be received more strongly in the context of intercultural philosophizing", new local groups such as NoBorder. NoProblem oriented themselves to international migration-sensitive contributions - also in connection with Islamic and decolonial feminisms, degrowth, global ecofeminisms, or the "ethnic studies" less known in the German-speaking world. The group is a student-run independent project of the Institute of Philosophy at the University of Hildesheim, which itself conducts research on philosophies in global perspective.

== Legacy ==
=== Support and links with the broader anarchist movement ===
The members of No Border were the driving force behind the organization of the Alternative Anticapitalist Anti-War Village in 2003, in protest against the G8. Organized in concert with the International of Anarchist Federations (IAF) and other anarchist organizations, this village drew significant inspiration from the camps previously established by the No Border network.

The No Border network was heavily talked about and supported at Anarchy 2023, one of the major gatherings of the anarchist movement in the 21st century.

== Publications ==
- Freedom to Move, Freedom to Stay: a No Borders Reader. London: No Borders, 2007.
- James A. Chamberlain. Minoritarian Democracy: The Democratic Case for No Borders Constellations: An International Journal of Critical and Democratic Theory

== See also ==
- Glasgow Girls (activists)
- UNITY (asylum seekers organisation)
- No one is illegal
- No Borders Orchestra
- Hellenic Rescue Team
- Iuventa
- Chiara Lauvergnac
- Mediterranea Saving Humans
- Migrant Offshore Aid Station
- Proactiva Open Arms
- Sea-Watch
- SOS Méditerranée

== Other sources ==
- Cohen, Steve, Deportation Is Freedom! The Orwellian World of Immigration Controls.
- Cohen, Steve (2003), No One is Illegal: Asylum and Immigration Control, Past and Present, Trentham, ISBN 9781858562919.
- Hamm, Marion (2002), A r/c tivism in Physical and Virtual Spaces, archived from the original on 2016-10-26.
- Schneider, Florian (2002), Knocking Holes In Fortress Europe.
- Sengupta, Shuddhabrata (2002), No Border Camp Strasbourg : A Report, archived from the original on 2004-03-13.
- Hauptfleisch, Wolfgang (2002), "Come Together – Das erste europäische Grenzcamp in Straßbourg vom 19.-28. Juli 2002", Graswurzelrevolution 271/2002, Muenster.
- Tsavdaroglou, Charalampos (2019), "Reimagining a Transnational Right to the City: No Border Actions and Commoning Practices in Thessaloniki", Social Inclusion, 7 (2): 219–229, doi:10.17645/si.v7i2.1973, hdl:11615/79880, S2CID 198670655.
