= Glasgow Girls =

Glasgow Girls can refer to:

- Glasgow Girls (artists), a group of female designers and artists associated with the Glasgow School
- Glasgow Girls (activists), a group of young women who highlighted the situation of asylum seekers in Glasgow

- Glasgow Girls (musical) a musical based on the activists

- Glasgow Girls F.C., a women's association football club
- Glasgow Girls, a 2014 TV movie by Brian Welsh
