= Amal Azzudin =

Somali-born Scottish activist (born 1990)

- Born: January 1990 (age 36)
- Education: Drumchapel High School; University of Glasgow
- Occupation: Human rights activist
- Known for: Co-founder of the Glasgow Girls

Amal Azzudin (born 1990) is an Egyptian-Scottish campaigner and activist who co-founded the Glasgow Girls, a group of seven young women who campaigned against the harsh treatment of asylum-seekers in response to the detention of one of their friends. The group's efforts raised public awareness and won the support of the Scottish Parliament. Azzudin has been featured in The Guardian, The Herald, The Scotsman, The Press and Journal, The Sunday Post.

== Early life ==
In 2000, Azzudin moved from Egypt to Glasgow, Scotland, with her mother. Four years later the Home Office granted the family leave to remain.

She is one of the founders of The Glasgow Girls – a group of Drumchapel High School students who, from 2005, campaigned against dawn raids and the deportation of refugee families. The other Glasgow Girls were Roza Salih, Ewelina Siwak, Toni-Lee Henderson, Jennifer McCarron and Emma Clifford. The group was formed after the home of one of their school friends, Agnesa Murselaj, a Roma from Kosovo, was dawn-raided one Sunday morning by 14 bullet-proof vested officers from the UK Border Force. After several weeks the family had not been released. “Even though I had my leave to remain, I couldn’t just sit there. I had to do something. That could have been my family,” Azzudin says.

== The Glasgow Girls campaign ==
The Glasgow Girls, encouraged by teacher Euan Girvan, formed a strategy to campaign on behalf of the family. Their online petitions to the Home Office went viral, and the then First Minister of Scotland, Jack McConnell agreed to meet them. The Glasgow Girls not only successfully prevented the deportation of the Murselaj family, but also forced a change in the asylum protocols.

== Career and later life ==
Since leaving University, Azzudin has worked for the Mental Health Foundation in Scotland as its Equality and Human Rights Officer. Her main role is to manage the refugee programme, including the Sawti project. Sawti, which means “my voice” in Arabic, aims to raise awareness of mental health and wellbeing, and has developed a mentoring scheme for refugees and asylum seekers in Scotland.

In 2015, Azzudin accompanied campaigners Margaret Woods and Pinar Aksu to Lesvos, where as many as 3000 refugees per day were arriving from Turkey. She wrote a diary of her experiences for The Herald Scotland.

She is an ambassador for the Scottish Refugee Council.

== Awards ==
- 2016: Saltire Society's Young Outstanding Woman of Scotland. Azzudin was winner of a Special Award to commemorate Saltire Society's 80th Anniversary
- 2016: Named one of the Young Women's Movement Outstanding Woman of Scotland
