= Bluebell Wood =

Bluebell Wood can mean:

- a bluebell wood, an area of woodland that contains large numbers of flowering bluebells
- Bluebell Wood, London, an ancient woodland that does not, actually, contain any bluebells
- Garscadden Wood, a nature reserve north of Glasgow commonly called "Bluebell Wood"
