= Unity (asylum seekers organisation) =

Scottish volunteer organisation

Unity is a volunteer-run organisation which provides support for asylum seekers and illegal immigrants in Glasgow, Scotland. The Unity Centre opened in 2006 and is in Ibrox, near the Home Office Immigration Centre.

== Support ==
Volunteers are involved with a range of activities:

- Providing practical support and information to asylum seekers and their families.
- Taking details of asylum seekers reporting at the Home Office Immigration Centre so that their families, friends and lawyers can be alerted if they are detained
- Providing a night shelter.
- Running a bi-monthly group to help LGBT (lesbian, gay, bisexual, and transgender) asylum seekers adjust to life in Glasgow.
- Helping to organise demonstrations to highlight the treatment of asylum seekers in the UK.

== Night shelter ==
Unity is one of the organisations involved in running Glasgow Destitution Network’s night shelter. The shelter provides temporary emergency accommodation for people who are not entitled to any other shelter or hostel. As of February 2015, the shelter has capacity for 15 male asylum seekers who have had their applications denied.

== History ==
UNITY: the Union of Asylum Seekers was formed in 2005, providing a focus for human rights issues at a time when the Home Office was using dawn raids to instigate deportations. Unity was involved with organising protests against this. The organisation had been involved with notifying when people were detained and sent to Dungavel or other detention centres. They have advocated alternatives to detention, especially where children are involved. They have campaigned against the enforced returns of Somalis.

== See also ==
- Immigration
- Modern immigration to the United Kingdom
- United Refugee Organization
- No Border network
- No one is illegal
