= Elizabeth Baker Bohan =

American journalist

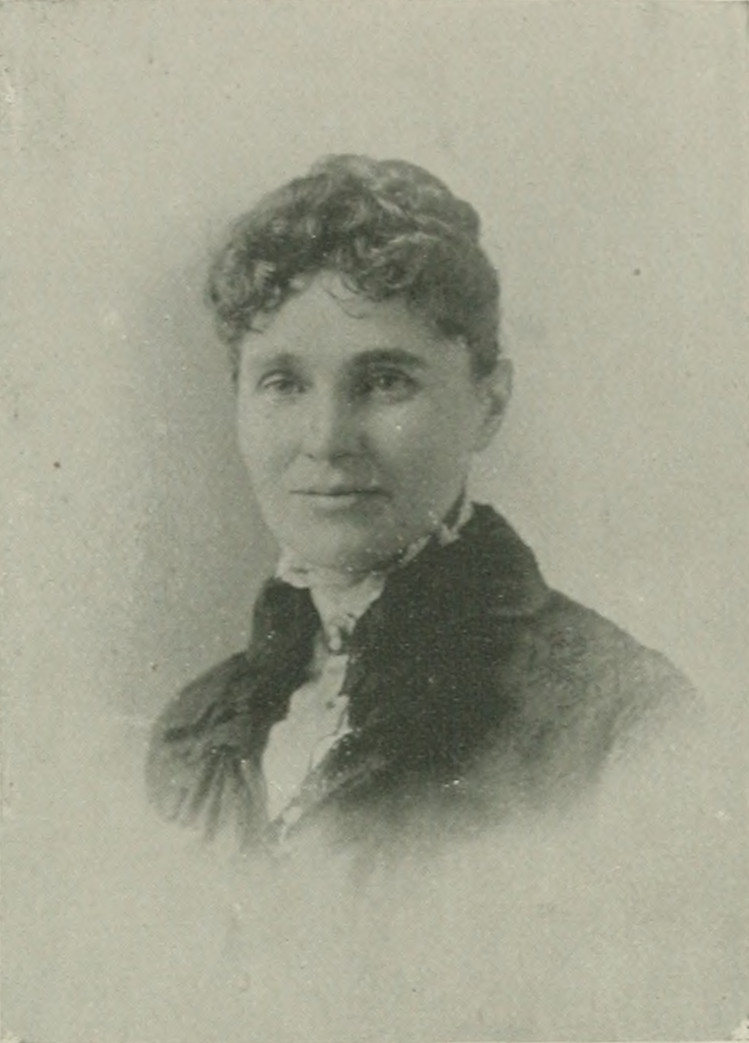
- Photo in A Woman of the Century
- Born: Elizabeth Claire Baker; August 18, 1849; Birmingham, England
- Died: August 27, 1930 (aged 81); Los Angeles, California, U.S.
- Resting place: Woodlawn Memorial Cemetery, Santa Monica, California, U.S.
- Occupations: author; journalist; artist; social reformer; teacher
- Spouse: Michael Bohan (m. 1872)
- Children: 2 sons, 2 daughters

Elizabeth Baker Bohan (née, Baker; August 18, 1849 – August 27, 1930) was a British-born American author, journalist, artist, and social reformer. She had a special interest in the reconstruction of the penal system. She published two novels, Un Americano, A Story of the Mission Days of California (1895) and The Drag-Net, A Prison Story of the Present Day (1909, illustrated by Langdon Smith).

== Early life and education ==
Elizabeth Claire Baker was born in Birmingham, England, August 18, 1849. Her parents were Joseph and Martha (Boddington) Baker. They came to the United States in 1854 and lived most of the time in Wisconsin.

She received her education in the Milwaukee, Wisconsin public schools. From her earliest youth, she practiced composition. At school, she not only wrote her own essays but many for her schoolmates.

== Career ==
For a time, Bohan worked as a teacher, and resided in West Bend, Wisconsin.

On September 2, 1872, in Milwaukee, she married Michael Bohan (b. 1832, Templemore, County Tipperary, Ireland). He was then editor of the Fond du Lac, Wisconsin, Journal, and previously editor of the West Bend, Democrat. The couple lived in Milwaukee with their four children, Arthur Baker, Edmonde (or Edmund) Russell, Martha Boddington, and Florence Claire. In 1894, Bohan removed to Los Angeles. Working with pencils, brushes, watercolor, and oils, she created floral still lifes, landscape paintings, portrait paintings, as well as black and white illustrations. She instructed several painters and musicians of Wisconsin.

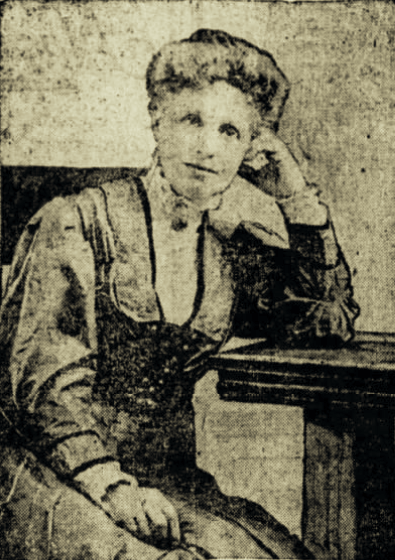
1912

Her enjoyment for writing increased as she became an adult. She wrote a great numbers of poems and a still greater number of prose sketches, but offered none for publication until within the late 1880s. Thereafter, a large numbers of her poems and sketches were published in papers and magazines throughout the U.S. She wrote for the West Coast Magazine as a staff writer for at least five years, and occasionally for the Chicago Tribune, Simons' Magazine, Munsey's Magazine, Milwaukee Sentinel, The Youth's Companion, National New Thought Monthly, The Club Woman, and others. Her serial stories included "The Burro Girl", and "The Strength of the Weak".

Bohan was a lecturer to women's clubs on civic reforms, with a special interest in the reconstruction of the penal system. She worked for the establishment of municipal farms for petty offenders.

== Personal life and death ==
Bohan was a member of the Southern California Press and the California Badger clubs. She favored woman suffrage and was a Progressive. Bohan died at her home in Los Angeles, California, August 27, 1930.

== Selected works ==
=== Poems ===
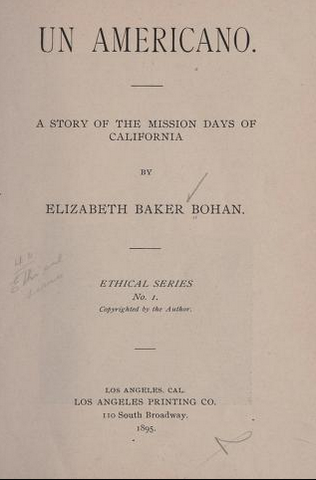
Un Americano, a story of the mission days of California (1895)

- "Sunny thoughts" (1885, poem)

=== Novels ===
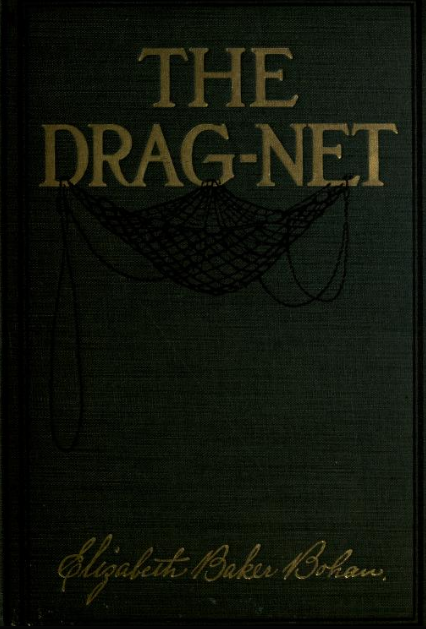
The Drag-Net (1909)

- Un Americano, A Story of the Mission Days of California (1895)
- The Drag-Net, A Prison Story of the Present Day (1909, illustrated by Langdon Smith)

=== Serial stories ===
- "The Burro Girl"
- "The Strength of the Weak"
