= Drumchapel =

Suburb of Glasgow, Scotland

Coordinates: 55.904937°N 4.360965°W

Drumchapel: Scottish Gaelic: Druim a' Chapaill
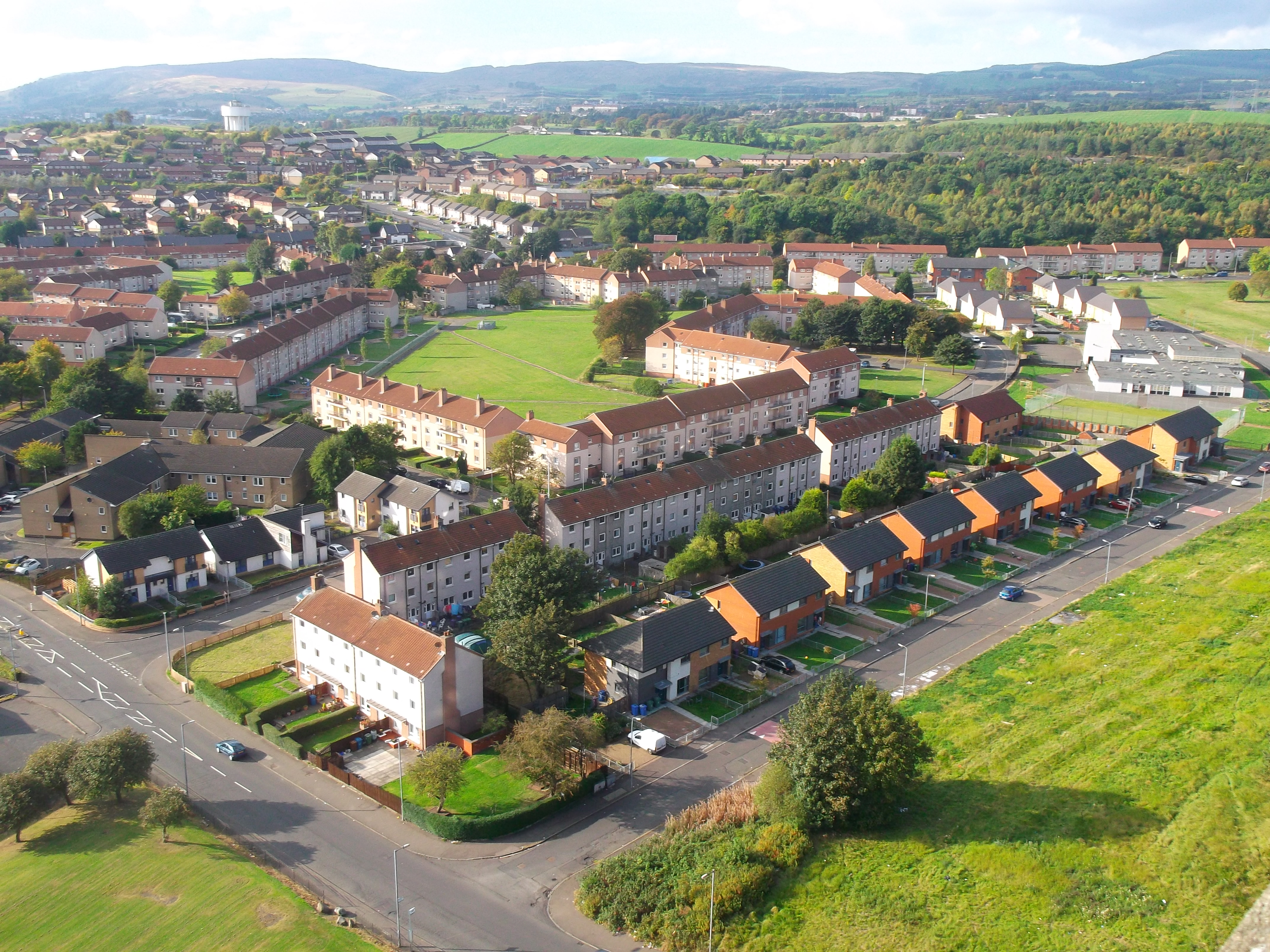
- Drumchapel housing photographed from the tower blocks at Linkwood Crescent (2014)

- Location within Glasgow
- Population: 12,976
- OS grid reference: NS525705
- Council area: Glasgow City Council
- Lieutenancy area: Glasgow
- Country: Scotland
- Sovereign state: United Kingdom
- Post town: GLASGOW
- Postcode district: G15
- Dialling code: 0141
- Police: Scotland
- Fire: Scottish
- Ambulance: Scottish
- UK Parliament: Glasgow North West
- Scottish Parliament: Glasgow Anniesland

Drumchapel (Scottish Gaelic: Druim a' Chapaill), known locally as 'The Drum', is a district in the north-west of the city of Glasgow, Scotland. It borders Bearsden (in East Dunbartonshire) to the north-east and Drumry (part of Clydebank, in West Dunbartonshire) to the south-west, as well as Blairdardie, Garscadden, Knightswood and Yoker in Glasgow to the south; land to the north (including the Garscadden Woodlands) is undeveloped and includes the course of the Roman-era Antonine Wall. The name derives from the Gaelic meaning 'the ridge of the horse'.

As part of the overspill policy of Glasgow Corporation, a huge housing estate was built here in the 1950s to house around 34,000 people, the land having been annexed from Dunbartonshire in 1938 – it is this estate that is now most associated with Drumchapel, despite there already being a neighbourhood to the south of Drumchapel railway station known by the same name, made up of affluent suburban villas; this is now known as Old Drumchapel.

Drumchapel is one of the 'Big Four' post-war social housing schemes in Glasgow, along with Easterhouse, Castlemilk and Greater Pollok.

== History ==
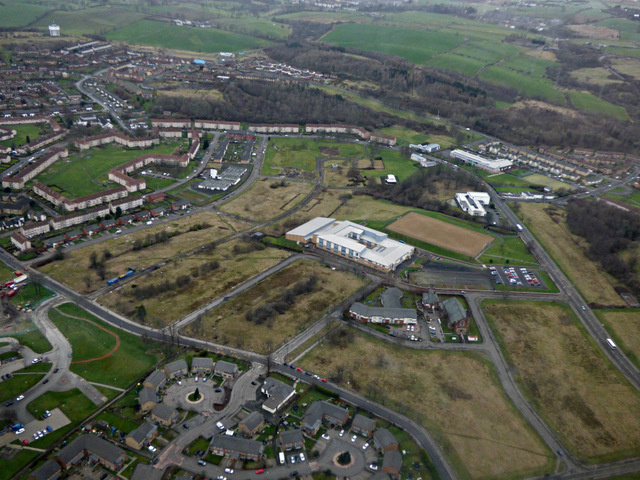
Aerial view of central Drumchapel (2017), with the local secondary school surrounded by expanses of unused land following the demolition of substandard housing, with modern houses and refurbished tenements also in view

Drumchapel was part of the parish of New Kilpatrick, becoming devolved in the late 19th century and a church parish in its own right in 1923. The Old Church (originally serving both Drumchapel and Blairdardie) was built in 1901 for an increasing local population. The parish boundary was redrawn to create the new parish of St Margarets in Knightswood.

Civil administration transferred from New Kilpatrick to Glasgow Corporation in 1938. As part of the overspill policy of Glasgow Corporation, a huge housing estate was built here in the 1950s.

The area suffered a tragedy in 1994, when a double-decker bus carrying a group of local Girl Guides crashed into one of the low rail bridges in the city's Tradeston area (the driver was unfamiliar with the route and was being led by a guide leader in a car); two 10-year-old girls, an 11-year-old girl and two adult supervisors were killed in the incident and 15 other children injured, six of them seriously.

== Geography ==
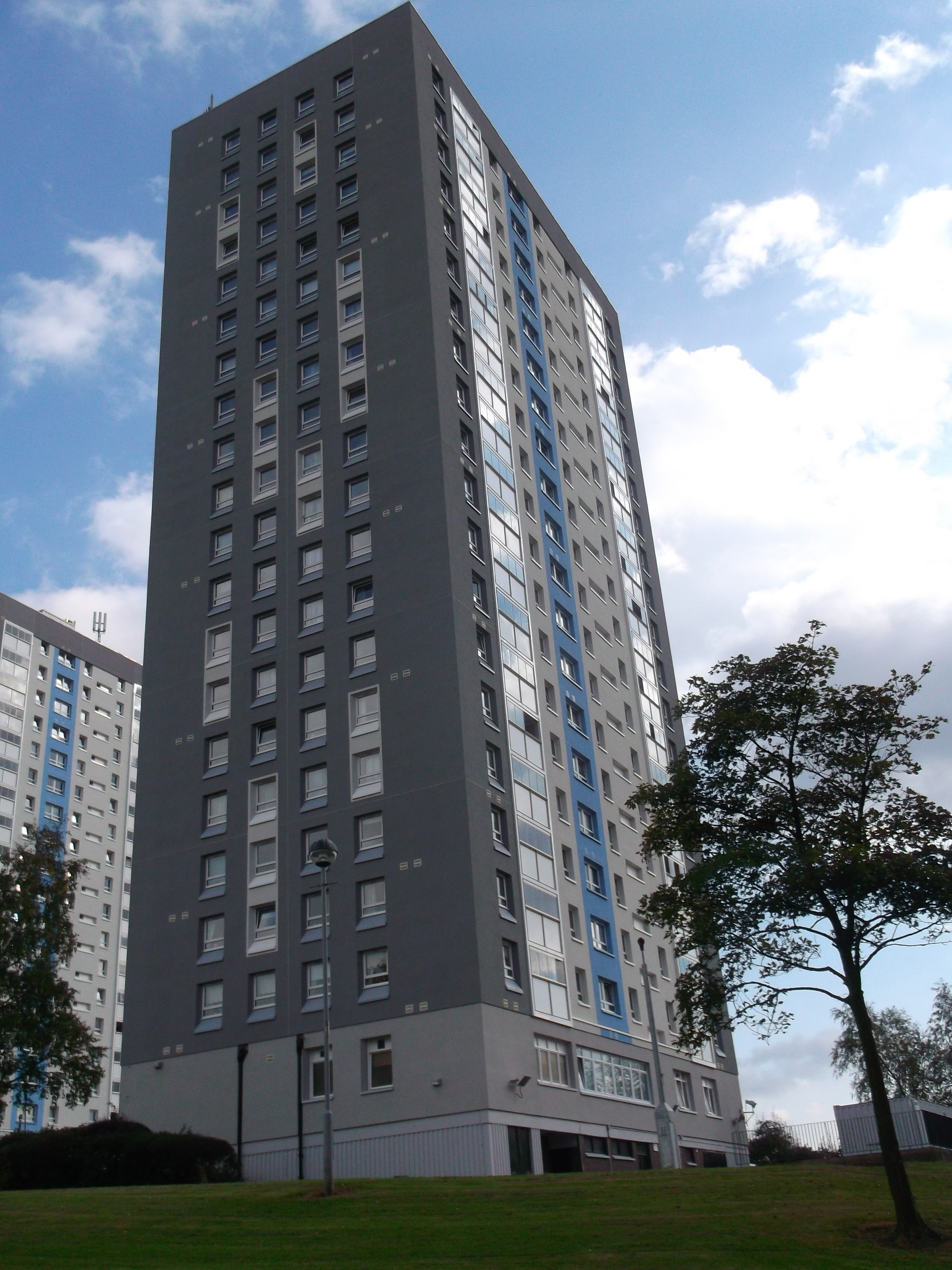
Linkwood Crescent tower blocks (two refurbished in the 2010s, one demolished)

The housing in the area is now 72% post-war tenement and 6% multi-storey flats, the remainder being other flats and houses. The current population was estimated in 2002 at 15,000, which was split across 6,000 households. The population of Drumchapel fell by 22% between 1996 and 2012 to 13,000. The proportion of people in the area from ethnic minority groups increased over the same time to 5%, which remains well below average for Glasgow (12%). Life expectancy in the area is about five years less than the average for Glasgow (male 69 years, female 74 years).

Socio-economically, the area is not affluent. In 2011/12, 48% of children were classed as living in poverty, and 57% of the population were NRS social grade D or E. 56% of households were single-parent. 21% of young people were not in education, employment or training. Just 22% of the population own their own home, about half the average figure for Glasgow.

== Economy ==
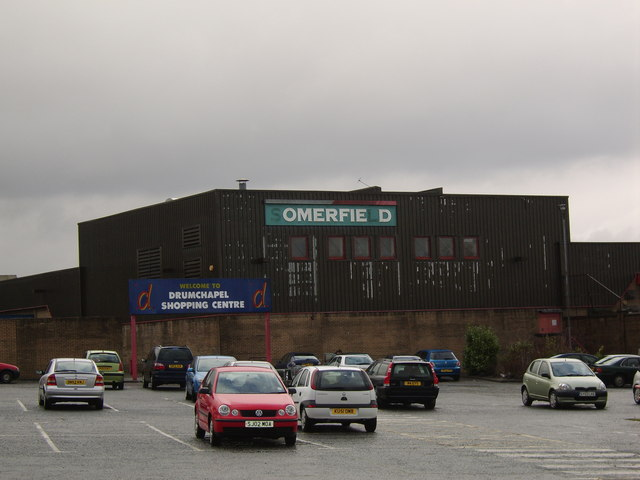
The derelict shopping centre at Drumchapel as it appeared around 2005

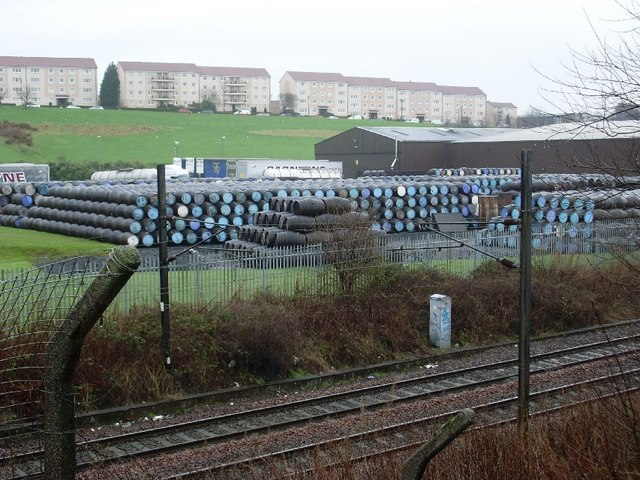
Whisky bond barrels and tenements on Heathcot Ave

The major employers for Drumchapel from the 1950s to the 1980s were the Goodyear Tyre & Rubber Co (GB) Ltd, Beattie's Biscuit Factory, Singers Sewing Machines (Clydebank), The Edrington Group Whisky Bond and the various shipyards on the Clyde. Beattie's Biscuit factory closed in 1978 and the Goodyear and Singers factories both closed in February 1979.

The Edrington Group Whisky Bond has grown over the years and is still a major employer in the area, while the shipyards have all gone with the exception of the now BAE Systems yards at Scotstoun and Govan. Drumchapel is now going through its second regeneration, with promises of better schools, better homes and higher employment.

== Notable residents ==
- Amal Azzudin, asylum activist
- Billy Connolly, comedian
- Tommy Cunningham, musician
- Jim Eadie, politician
- Andy Gray, international footballer
- James Kelman, writer
- George Kerevan, journalist and politician
- John MacDonald, footballer
- Christina McAnea, trade union leader
- James McAvoy, actor
- Danny McGrain, international footballer
- Roza Salih, asylum activist
- George Seawright, politician and paramilitary in Northern Ireland
- Jim Sheridan, politician
- Sharon Small, actress
- Gordon Smith, footballer
- Gregor Stevens, footballer
- Brian Whittingham, writer
- Brian Wright, footballer

== See also ==
- Glasgow tower blocks
