= Francis Dupuis-Déri =

French-Canadian researcher (born 1966)

Francis Dupuis-Déri (born 1966, Montreal) is a French Canadian researcher and professor at the Université du Québec à Montréal. He is best known for his political commentary on anti-feminism and anarchism, for his books L’Erreur humaine (1991), Lettre aux cons (1992), L’Archipel identitaire (1997), Love & rage (1998), L'Éthique du vampire (2007), and L'altermondialisme (2009), and as one of the co-founders of Les Zapartistes. A graduate of the University of British Columbia, and later was a researcher at Massachusetts Institute of Technology and the University of Montreal.

== Biography ==
In 2002-2003, he participated in organizing the Alternative Anticapitalist Anti-War Village (VAAAG) organized by numerous anarchist and anti-globalist groups.
