= Roza Salih =

Scottish politician and human rights activist

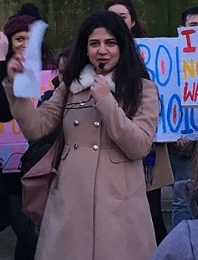
- Salih campaigning in Glasgow in 2018 for equal access to abortion in Ireland
- Born: Roza Salih; 1989 (age 36–37); Iraq
- Education: Strathclyde University
- Occupations: Politician, human rights activist
- Years active: 2001–present
- Known for: Glasgow Girls (activists)

Roza Salih (born 1989) is an Iraqi-Kurdish born, Scottish politician and human rights activist. In 2005, at the age of 15, she co-founded the Glasgow Girls with fellow pupils from Drumchapel High School. The Glasgow Girls campaigned to stop the UK Border Agency carrying out dawn raids and detaining and then deporting children, successfully preventing the deportation of their school friend, Agnesa Murselaj, a Roma from Kosovo. Salih, who was born in Southern Kurdistan, is a co-founder of Scottish Solidarity with Kurdistan.

In May 2021, she stood as a candidate at the 2021 Scottish Parliament election, standing as the lead candidate for the Scottish National Party on the Glasgow region. In May 2022, she was elected as an SNP councillor for Greater Pollok ward on Glasgow City Council, the first former refugee to be elected to political office in Scotland.

== Early life and education ==
Roza Salih arrived in Scotland in 2001 to seek asylum. Her family had fled Iraqi Kurdistan after her grandfather and two uncles had been executed for opposing Saddam Hussein, who was still in power.

Salih attended Drumchapel High School, and then graduated with honors in Law and Politics from Strathclyde University in 2013 where she was also Vice President for Diversity and Advocacy for the Students Association. She was elected to the National Union of Students' International Students Committee and the NUS UK Student trustee board.

== Activism ==
In March 2005, whilst still a pupil at Drumchapel High School, Salih campaigned with fellow pupils to stop the UK Border Agency carrying out dawn raids, taking school children to Yarl's Wood and then deporting them. As well as lobbying the Scottish Government and the Home Office, the Glasgow Girls, as they became known, developed an early warning system with friends and neighbours to alert one another about raids by immigration officers.

In 2016, she worked with the Scottish Refugee Council and Education Strategy Commission to campaign for funding for scholarships for asylum seekers. She is co-founder of Scottish Solidarity with Kurdistan and has travelled to Kurdish regions in Turkey as part of a delegation of trade unionists and human rights activists.

In 2017, Salih was appointed as a member of the Scottish Trades Union Congress.

In April 2021, she hit out at UK Home Secretary Priti Patel's proposals for immigration reform, which would see asylum seekers penalised if they travelled to the UK through another country that they could have claimed asylum in first. Salih said, "Having been through the UK's asylum system - and experienced first hand how deeply flawed it is - I am appalled that the UK government are planning on doubling down instead of fixing the issues. Scotland has made it clear it wants nothing to do with Boris Johnson and Priti Patel's toxic migration policies and wants an asylum system based on the principles of fairness, dignity and respect." She went on to say, "These practises and new proposals show the harsh reality of the Tories' hostile environment. Their consistent attempts to roll back, or simply abandon human rights obligations and break international law are a disgrace. Sadly, putting hostility over humanity is now the norm for this Tory government."

She is in favour of the UK becoming a republic.

== Political career ==
Salih said that she joined the Scottish National Party because she sees parallels between Kurdistan's fight for self-determination and Scottish independence. "Independence has always been in my blood," she told the i. "Kurdish people want independence and their autonomy and we fought for it – literally people died for the cause. Here it's only a signature in a referendum and people can do that in a democratic country. Back home, you have to fight for it and die for it." Salih previously worked in the constituency office of Chris Stephens, the SNP MP for Glasgow South West.

In 2017, she stood as an SNP candidate for the Garscadden/Scotstounhill ward in the Glasgow City Council election, but was not elected.

She is a part of Social Justice Commission of the SNP and stood for the party's nomination for Clydebank and Milngavie in the 2021 Scottish Parliament election, but lost it to Marie McNair, a Clydebank councillor. On 5 March 2021, Salih was selected at the number one SNP candidate for the Glasgow region. Had she been successful, she would have been first refugee ever to be elected to Holyrood, but the SNP won all the city constituencies so did not receive any list seats.

She was elected as an SNP councillor in the Greater Pollok ward in Glasgow at the 2022 Scottish local elections, and is now a baillie.

In 2024, it was disclosed that she (along with 3 other Glasgow City Councillors) was in arrears for payment of £1,210 in Council Tax. Salih said: “This was an unfortunate oversight which has now been resolved.”

== Awards and recognition ==
A musical of the Glasgow Girls was co-produced by The National Theatre of Scotland, Theatre Royal Stratford East, the Citizens Theatre and Richard Jordan Productions. Written by David Greig and directed and composed by Cora Bissett, it premiered at the Citizens Theatre in Glasgow in 2012. In the original 2012 cast, the part of Roza Salih was played by Amiera Darwish.

In 2017 she was honoured by the Saltire Society as an Outstanding Woman of Scotland.

In December 2022, the BBC named Salih as one of the Top 100 Influential Women of 2022.
