= Glasgow International Comedy Festival =

Annual comedy festival in Glasgow, Scotland

Coordinates: 55.859°N 4.257°W

Glasgow International Comedy Festival is an annual comedy festival in Glasgow, Scotland which started in 2002. It is held in March in venues across the city. The festival's aim is to have the biggest impact of any comedy festival in the world. The festival promotes Glasgow as the funniest city in the world and is intended to celebrate comedy's role in Scottish culture.

Acts including Kevin Bridges and Susie McCabe performed their first solo shows at the Glasgow International Comedy Festival.

In 2019 the European Commission named Glasgow as the top cultural and creative city in the United Kingdom. The report cited the Comedy Festival among other cultural events as being integral to this status. The festival is recognised for playing host to a number of high-profile comedians and providing a platform for new acts.

In 2014 the festival arranged for a comedy gig to be held on a Virgin Trains West Coast train service between London and Glasgow. Eight comedians including Patrick Monahan performed aboard a 'comedy carriage' of an afternoon service.

There have been several comedy performances linked to charity fundraising at the festival. Kevin Bridges headlined an event in memory of campaigner Gordon Aikman which raised £25,000 for motor neuron disease charity MND Scotland. The festival organisers have aimed to widen the appeal of the festival to new audiences through accessibility improvements. In 2017 the festival hosted a show delivered in British sign language, thought to be the first of its kind in the UK, and in 2020 a dementia-friendly comedy gig was held in the city's west end.

For the 2023 festival the only award given out by the festival, the Sir Billy Connolly Spirit of Glasgow Award, was introduced. The inaugural winner was Janey Godley.
