= Chiara Lauvergnac =

Italian anarchist resident in London (born 1961)

- Born: 1961 (age 64–65); Trieste, Italy
- Education: University of East London
- Occupation: Activist
- Known for: Campaigning for the rights of migrants and asylum seekers

Chiara Lauvergnac (born 1961) is an Italian activist based in London. She describes herself as a "freelance troublemaker" and is a campaigner for the rights of migrants and asylum seekers.

== Background ==
Chiara Lauvergnac was born in Trieste, Italy, in 1961. She is related to the jazz singer, Anna Lauvergnac. She lived in Galway, Ireland, and moved to London in 2006 to study anthropology at the University of East London.

== Activism ==
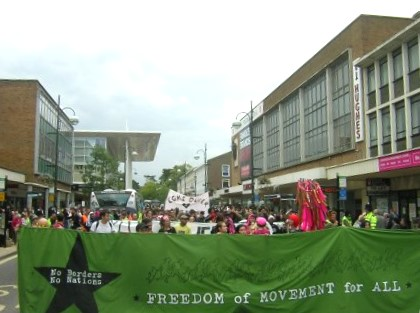
A No Borders demonstration at Crawley, 2007

Lauvergnac is a campaigner for the rights of migrants and asylum seekers. In 2006, she protested outside the Haslar detention centre in Hampshire. In 2009, she was part of a group that protested at Tinsley House Immigration Removal Centre at Gatwick against the use of charter flights to deport failed asylum seekers and others to Kurdistan in Iraq. She was arrested and convicted of aggravated trespass and given a conditional discharge.

In 2015, she was again involved in protests against the deportation of refugees from the United Kingdom at Gatwick Airport during which she was arrested and subsequently fined. She is a leading figure in the London No Borders anarchist group, part of the No Border network. Her photographs of the camp featured in the exhibition Art, Refuge and Resistance at the Brighton & Hove Sanctuary on Sea in partnership with the University of Brighton.
