= Agnes Curran =

- Born: Agnes Brennan; 12 February 1920; Greenock
- Died: 29 September 2005 (aged 85); Greenock
- Occupation: Prison governor
- Known for: 1st female prison governor of a UK prison for men
- Spouse: two
- Children: three

Agnes Curran MBE (12 February 1920 – 29 September 2005) was a British prison governor. She was the first female prison governor of a UK prison for men

== Life ==
Curran was born, Agnes Brennan, in Gourock in 1920. She was the eldest of nine children.

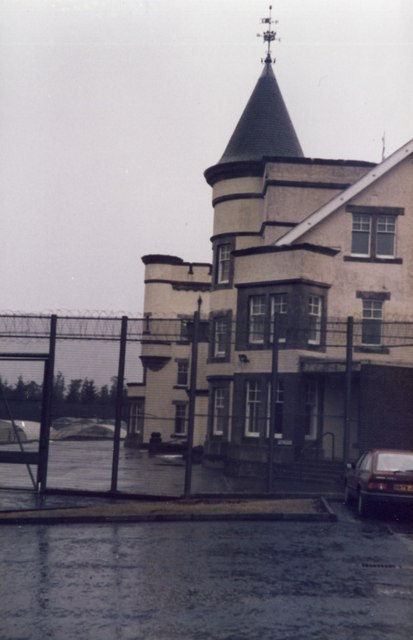
HMP Dungavel in 1979

She became a mental health nurse and rose to be deputy matron of Ravenscraig Hospital. She then studied nursing administration. Curran had volunteered to work in prisons and in 1969 she joined Gateside prison for women as assistant governor. The prison closed in 1974 and she was moved to HM Prison Cornton Vale.

In 1979 she became the governor of Dungavel prison. She was the first female prison governor of a prison for men in Britain. Curran was surprised to be appointed and she had to deal with the attitudes taken by male staff and prisoners to a woman governor. She realised that the staff only ran the prison because the prisoners allowed it. She was appointed a Member of the Order of the British Empire in 1984.

Curran died in Greenock in 2005 days after her second husband, Edward had died.
