= Brian Whittingham =

Scottish writer (1950–2022)

- Born: 1950; Drumchapel, Glasgow, Scotland
- Died: 19 January 2022 (aged 71–72)
- Occupation: Writer
- Website: www.brianwhittingham.uk

Brian Whittingham (1950 – 19 January 2022) was a Scottish writer, editor and lecturer on creative writing.

== Early life and career ==
Brian Whittingham was born in Glasgow, Scotland in 1950. He lived in a council tenement in Drumchapel until the early 1970s. Before becoming a full-time writer he worked as a steelworker/draftsman in Glasgow shipbuilding yards close to the Titan Crane. He worked on the squad that built the QE2, launched 1967 and attended a gala dinner on board in 2008 to mark the ship's retirement to become a floating hotel in Palm Jumeirah, Dubai.

== Personal life and death ==
He has two children. He enjoyed the Scottish climate and travel. He was an art fan with a preference for Post impressionists work.

Brian died on 19 January 2022.

== Works ==
Poetry

- Bunnets 'N' Bowlers (A Clydeside Odyssey) (Luath Press)
- Drink The Green Fairy (Luath Press)
- Septimus Pitt & The Grumbleoids (Luath Press, illustrated by Mandy Sinclair)
- Old Man from Brooklyn and The Charing Cross Carpet (Maricat Press)
- Swiss Watches & The Ballroom Dancer (Taranis Books)
- Ergonomic Workstations & Spinning Tea Cans (Taranis Books)
- Industrial Deafness (Crazy Day Press)

Editorial work

- Making Soup in a storm
- The Dynamics of Balsa
- Bucket of Frogs
- West Coast Literary Magazine

Plays

- Diamonds in Bedlam
- The Devil's dandruff
- Boo!
- Smugglers and Black Damp

Performance

- Ballad of the Big Ships - he read his poetry and told stories of his life in the shipyards.

He recorded Edwin Morgan's poem, "The Loch Ness Monster Song" as a tribute along with other invited poets, to celebrate Edwin's 80th Birthday.

His workshops have consisted of teenagers writing poems in the sand on the Normandy beaches, senior citizens writing their memories whilst sitting in tramcars in Glasgow's Transport Museum, youngsters writing plant poems in Glasgow's Winter Gardens and Hawaiian students writing dialect pieces in Seattle University.

He has worked as Writer in Residence for East Lothian Council. He has enjoyed long term fellowships at Yaddo in Seattle and Robert Louis Stevenson Fellowship at Chevillon Grez in Paris.

== Sources ==
- Books From Scotland
- Scottish Book Trust
- The 3 Queens Video on YouTube
