= Alternative Anticapitalist Anti-War Village =

Anarchist gathering in 2003

- Date: May 28 – June 3, 2003
- Duration: 5 days
- Location: Annemasse Aerodrome, France
- Type: Political and cultural gathering
- Motive: Coordinate anarchists and anti-globalists, allow them to meet and interact
- Organized by: Dozen of anarchist groups, including the No Pasaran and No Border networks and the Anarchist Federations of several countries
- Participants: 3000 - 4000

The Alternative Anticapitalist Anti-War Village (VAAAG) was an anarchist and anti-globalization camp organized between 28 May and 3 June 2003, on the fringes of the G8 summit in Évian-les-Bains. Bringing together between 3,000 and 4,000 anarchists and anti-globalists, the village was self-managed across numerous aspects of its operations.

Following the rebirth of the anarchist movement in the West and the spread of the anti-globalization movement, the two having been linked from the start, initiatives uniting both movements began to multiply. To protest the G8 summit, the village was launched by a relatively large number of anarchist groups and organizations. Despite internal conflicts with Le Point G, a women-only feminist village located near the VAAAG, these disputes, debates, and links created a situation where the feminist demands of Le Point G began to influence the VAAAG and, more broadly, the European far-left.

Anarchists considered the establishment of the village a 'success' that succeeded in uniting the anti-globalization and anarchist movements while maintaining a visible presence; it thus marked the period of rebirth of the anarchist movement and its growing influence on the far-left of that period. Nevertheless, some, such as Francis Dupuis-Déri, believe the village should have been more open to feminist demands.

== History ==
=== Background: Fall of the USSR, rebirth of anarchism, birth of anti-globalization ===
From the 1970s onward, and even more so following the fall of the USSR and the 1990s, the anarchist movement underwent a rebirth in the West. Several factors drove this resurgence, including the evolution of capitalism at the end of the 20th century (offshoring, etc.), the end of state-communist support for Marxist-Leninist parties, and the fact that state-socialist and communist movements were increasingly discredited within the far left. According to historian Spencer Beswick and Marxist historian Max Elbaum, from the late 20th century onward, anarchists began to outpace other far-left currents, 'eclipsing' the influence of Marxist-Leninists on popular demands and struggles.

The anti-globalization movement formed during the same period and was influenced by the anarchists who joined it from the very beginning. Although not all anti-globalists were anarchists, the two movements largely converged; this resulted in the anti-globalization movement adopting anarchist political procedures and practices. The fact that anarchists invested so heavily in anti-globalization is one of the reasons for their spread; they were quicker than communists or other political movements to link their struggles to anti-globalization, which ultimately strengthened them.

=== Premises and organization ===
In October 2002, the No Pasaran network began floating the idea of organizing an anarchist and anti-globalization campsite in Évian for the G8 summit; a similar camp had been envisioned for the 2002 G8 in Canada, but authorities intervened at the time to prevent its organization.

The organization was led by local groups and a number of individuals returning from the No Border network camps. Drawing on this activist experience, they set about organizing the project. The preliminary consultation phase saw conflicts with non-anarchist and less radical leftist groups, such as ATTAC or the Trotskyists of the Revolutionary Communist League (LCR); these two groups did not want a self-managed village and consequently left the discussions, seeking to launch a smaller, competing campsite instead.

Following their departure, the organization continued without them, with anarchists and alter-globalists uniting under the Collective of Anti-authoritarian and Anti-capitalist Struggles against the G8 (CLAAACG8). This collective brought together a significant number of anarchist groups in addition to the No Pasaran network, including the Francophone, Anglophone, and Italian Anarchist Federations, the Confédération nationale du travail (CNT), the Libertarian Collective of Bordeaux, Alternative Libertaire (AL), the Libertarian Communist Organization (OCL), the Federation of Anarchist Communists, the Freie Arbeiter*innen-Union (FAU), the Libertarian Socialist Organization (OSL), the Anti-WTO Coordination, and the Red Libertaria Apoyo Mutuo.

One of the organizers was the anarchist historian Francis Dupuis-Déri. They secured a campsite through negotiations with the local town hall, rendering the settlement legal.

=== Alternative Anticapitalist Anti-War Village (VAAAG) ===
The village took place from 28 May to 3 June 2003, with the G8 summit itself held between 1 and 3 June; it was located in the vicinity of the Annemasse aerodrome. About ten days before the official opening, an initial wave of anarchists arrived at the site to set up the necessary infrastructure to welcome visitors and newcomers.

The village grew to host between 3,000 and 4,000 people, placing it behind Anarchy 2023 on the list of the largest anarchist gatherings of the 21st century. Many aspects of its organization and management were self-managed; the village was divided into neighborhoods, similar to the No Border network camps, with each neighborhood having its own general assembly to make local decisions.

A women-only feminist village, Le Point G, was held alongside the VAAAG. This feminist village was established on land provided by the VAAAG, which entrusted its management to them. However, despite this initial proximity, conflicts emerged between the activists of Le Point G and those of the VAAAG. The women were mocked for their choice of a women-only space, and generally, the VAAAG participants did not understand their orientation, this caused a rift between the two groups, as some activists viewed them as practicing 'separatism'. Nevertheless, Le Point G, its members, and the debates surrounding these issues succeeded in permeating the anarchist and anti-globalization movements with their feminist inquiries and demands.

Numerous screenings were organized throughout the village's duration, and theoretical and practical debates and discussions took place among participants. Some of these screenings brought together members from Le Point G and anarchists from the VAAAG, who still met during these types of joint activities.

On the fringes of the gathering, some anarchists engaged in more radical actions, such as attempting to disrupt the G8 summit they had come to protest; the premises where the Socialist Party (PS) was holding a 'well-behaved' conference were pelted with stones.

== Legacy ==
=== Reception within the anarchist movement ===
In an article published in December 2003 in Le Monde libertaire, the press organ of the Francophone Anarchist Federation (FA), several anarchists representing various organizing groups expressed satisfaction with the event. They described it as a 'successful mobilization', and a representative of the FA wrote:

[This initiative] allowed us to show that, by standing united, the libertarian movement could be an essential force for mobilization and protest, while also demonstrating its capacity to offer concrete social alternatives. We championed the idea of a break with capitalism. The goal of the libertarian mobilization against the G8 [...] was to assert and establish an anti-capitalist, anti-authoritarian, and revolutionary political and syndicalist pole, a pole autonomous from reformist currents, NGOs, or anyone seeking merely to humanize capitalism.

=== Limitations ===
Dupuis-Déri maintains that while the gathering was innovative and succeeded in uniting the anarchist and anti-globalization movements, the initiative also faced internal issues during its operation. According to the anarchist historian, these primarily concerned the management of its relationship with Le Point G, which he argues should have received broader support for its political choices.

== Bibliography ==
- Beswick, Spencer (2022), "From the Ashes of the Old: Anarchism Reborn in a Counterrevolutionary Age (1970s-1990s)", Anarchist Studies, vol. 30, no. 2, pp. 31‑54
- Dupuis-Déri, Francis (2019), Les nouveaux anarchistes: De l'altermondialisme au zadisme [The new anarchists: from alter-globalization to zadism] (in French), Paris: Textuel, ISBN 978-2845977501
- Jourdain, Édouard (2023). Géopolitique de l'anarchisme: Vers un nouveau moment libertaire [Geopolitics of anarchism: towards a new libertarian moment]. Paris: Cavalier Bleu. ISBN 979-1031805856.
