= Gordon Aikman =

Scottish political researcher (1985–2017)

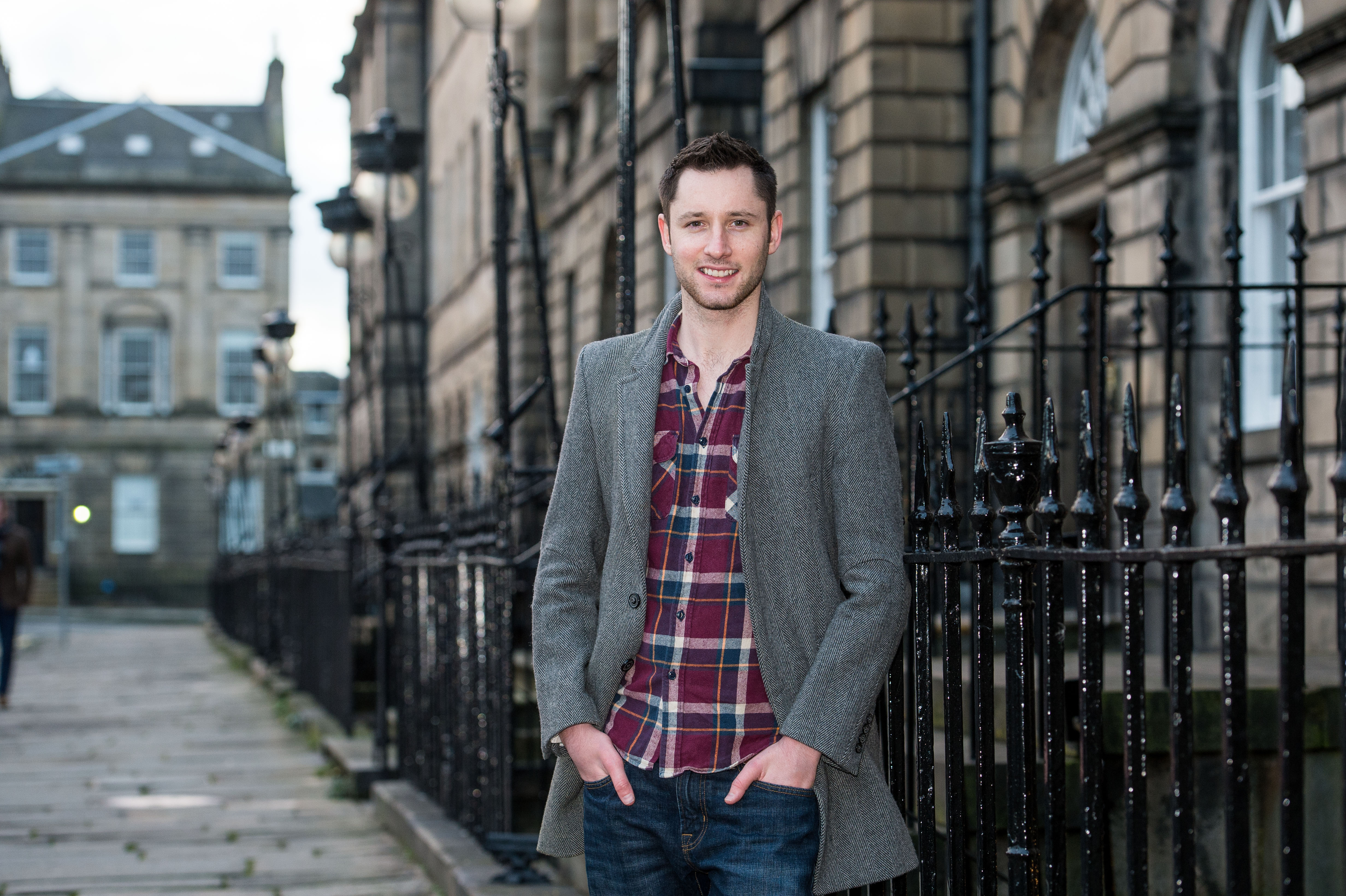
- Born: 2 April 1985; Kirkcaldy, Scotland
- Died: 2 February 2017 (aged 31)
- Education: Kirkcaldy High School; University of Edinburgh
- Occupations: Political researcher, campaigner

Gordon Lewis Aikman BEM (2 April 1985 – 2 February 2017) was a Scottish political researcher and campaigner. He was Director of Research for the Better Together campaign during the Scottish Independence Referendum. During that campaign he was diagnosed with motor neurone disease. Aikman successfully lobbied the Scottish Government to double the number of MND nurses in Scotland, and to fund them via the NHS. He also raised more than £500,000 for medical research.

== Early life ==
Gordon Aikman studied at Kirkcaldy High School where he was head boy. He studied Business at the University of Edinburgh. In 2007, he was elected as the sabbatical officer responsible for welfare and student societies in the Edinburgh University Students' Association.

== Political career and MND campaigning ==
After graduation, he worked at the Scottish Parliament for the Scottish Labour Party as a researcher and later a press officer. In September 2012, he was appointed as Director of Research for the Better Together campaign in the Scottish Independence Referendum.

In June 2014, Aikman was diagnosed with motor neurone disease (MND), also known as amyotrophic lateral sclerosis (ALS), a degenerative neurological condition, having initially complained of a persistent numbness in his fingers. Having received this diagnosis, he quickly launched a "Five-Point Fightback" campaign calling for increased research funding to help find a cure for MND.

His campaign was launched soon after his diagnosis and had drawn support from across the UK political spectrum.

After meeting Aikman in November 2014, First Minister Nicola Sturgeon announced that there would be a review of motor neurone disease care in Scotland. Sturgeon later announced she was honouring her promise to Aikman and that the NHS in Scotland would begin to fund specialist nursing, and double the number of MND specialist nurses.

By June 2016, Aikman had raised £500,000 towards research into motor neurone disease. In March 2015 the 250,000 mark was broken after an event at the Glasgow International Comedy Festival that featured performances by Frankie Boyle, Stewart Francis and Fred MacAulay generated £25,000 in ticket sales.

== Writing ==
He wrote articles about his campaigning work and personal journey with MND that were published in The Scotsman, Daily Record and The Herald. In 2017, he wrote a monthly column in the Scottish edition of The Sunday Times.

== Recognition ==
- Judges' Award at the Scottish Politician of the Year awards – November 2014.
- Daily Record Our Heroes Award alongside fellow MND campaigner Lucy Lintott.
- Honorary doctorate (Doctor honoris causa) from the University of Edinburgh. Mr Aikman made the commencement address to graduating medical students – July 2015
- Kingdom FM Award at Kingdom FM's annual Local Hero Awards – August 2015.
- Campaigner of the Year at the Scottish Politician of the Year awards – November 2015.
- British Empire Medal in the 2015 Birthday Honours "for services to motor neurone disease Awareness and Research".
- Columnist of the Year at the Scottish Press Awards – May 2017.
- People's Choice Award at Scottish Charity Awards – June 2017.
- Gordon Aikman Lecture Theatre, previously George Square Theatre, was renamed in 2018 in recognition of Aikman's campaigning. Former UK Prime Minister Gordon Brown gave the inaugural lecture in October 2018.
- Naming of a ScotRail InterCity 125 train – June 2021

== Personal life ==
Aikman was married to Joe Pike, a political journalist for ITV News who later became a Sky News journalist.

Aikman died on 2 February 2017 at the age of 31.
