= Annemasse Aerodrome =

Annemasse Aerodrome Aérodrome d'Annemasse
- IATA: QNJ; ICAO: LFLI

Summary
- Airport type: Public
- Serves: Annemasse
- Location: Annemasse, Ville-la-Grand, Vetraz-Monthoux and Cranves-Sales
- Elevation AMSL: 1,617 ft (493 m)
- Coordinates: 46°11′32″N 006°16′05″E
- Interactive map of Annemasse Aerodrome

Runways
Direction	Length		Surface
Direction	ft	m	Surface
12/30	4,265	1,300	Paved

Annemasse Aerodrome or Marcel Bruchon Aerodrome (French: Aérodrome d'Annemasse) (ICAO: LFLI) is an airport in Annemasse, a commune in Haute-Savoie, France.

== History ==
In 2003, the Alternative Anticapitalist Anti-War Village (VAAAG), a gathering of the European anarchist and anti-globalization movements, took place near the grounds of the aerodrome.
