= Ay family =

Kurdish asylum seekers in Europe

The Ay family are Kurdish asylum seekers who became the centre of a controversy in 2003 surrounding the policy of locking up children in high security immigration detention centres in the United Kingdom.

Salih and Yurdugal Ay were Kurds seeking asylum who came to the UK to escape persecution in Turkey, it being alleged that Mrs Ay had been locked up and raped by Turkish militia. They brought their four children with them and settled in Gravesend in Kent where the children attended local schools. Salih was deported to Germany and from there further deported back to Turkey where he disappeared.

In 2002, Yurdugal Ay and her children were suddenly removed from their home by immigration officials and taken to Dungavel detention centre in South Lanarkshire, Scotland. They were all put together in one room where they lived for a year inside a razor wire surrounded compound. Yurdugal could not speak English very well so it was up to her eldest daughter, Beriwan Ay aged 13, to negotiate for her mother and her sisters. The family were threatened with deportation but appealed. It was claimed by the authorities that they had brought the long stay at Dungavel upon themselves by this appeal.

Conditions in the privatised detention centre, run by the American private-prison operator GEO Group, were far from satisfactory. There were no proper education facilities for the children. The children were treated as prisoners with just 2 hours exercise outside allowed each day. There were very limited play facilities. The Children's Commissioner for Scotland described the situation there as 'morally distressing' and threatened to report the UK Government and Scottish Executive to the United Nations Convention on the Rights of the Child. The British Home Secretary at the time David Blunkett appeared to disregard various conventions on human rights requirements about not imprisoning children claiming that the other alternative — separating the children from their parents and putting them into care — was also undesirable.

Bishop John Mone met Beriwan Ay on a visit to Dungavel and was appalled by what he discovered. During a later visit he smuggled a video camera into the centre [clergymen not being searched there], interviewed Beriwan to camera and released the video to the media. This was shown on BBC television's Newsnight programme. The case was also taken up by the Herald newspaper.

A media storm ensued. The Scottish Executive had responsibilities for children's welfare in Scotland but was clashing with a non devolved act from the UK parliament in Westminster. Eventually the Ay family lost their appeal against deportation and were forcibly deported via Stansted Airport to Germany where they were granted asylum. On 27 October 2006 BBC Radio 4 broadcast a play by Frank Deasy called Broken English portraying the case from Beriwan Ay's point of view.

In January 2012 the Home Office agreed to pay them a 6-figure sum of compensation in an out of court settlement following a civil action against the UK government for the ordeal of their time in detention.
