= No Borders Orchestra =

The No Borders Orchestra (NBO) is an ensemble of classical musicians from former Yugoslavia, founded in 2012 and directed by Premil Petrović. The NBO wants to contribute to overcoming the stereotypes of nationalism, racism, xenophobia and homophobia by artistic excellence in classical music.

== Background ==
Former Yugoslavia consisted of six republics and two autonomous regions. Within a decade after the death of the long time president Josip Broz Tito (1892-1980) nationalistic tensions inside this multi-ethnic and multi-cultural state grew enormously and, in the early 1990s, Yugoslavia broke apart with an outburst of violence, a bitter war in Bosnia and ethnic cleansing. 2.2 million refugees had been displaced by the end of the Bosnian war. Seven new states were established, each with an own currency, with an own army and with border controls. Many families and friends were split up and large parts of the population deplored the development and the wars. Today, Slovenia and Croatia belong to the European Union, thus creating a heavily fortified border within the former Yugoslavian nation. Although Slovenia, Montenegro and Kosovo now use the Euro as their currency and although most of the succession states are seeking membership of the European Union, most borders, currencies and restrictions are still in effect.

The founders of NBO stated that their "main interest is the connection between music and life", that they were influenced by the West-Eastern Divan Orchestra and its founder Daniel Barenboim and that they wished "to avoid the trap of artistic excellence as an excuse for marginalized self-complacency, voluntary exclusion from society and time".

Although the originally planned start of the orchestra in 2011 with Mahler's Resurrection Symphony could not be realized due to lack of appropriate fundings, the project started thereafter. The NBO unites around fifty musicians from almost all music centers in the former Yugoslavia, from Belgrade, Ljubljana, Zagreb, Sarajevo, Skopje, Priština and Novi Sad. They were especially trained by renowned musicians from several German orchestras such as Berlin Philharmonic and WDR Symphony Orchestra Cologne.

=== 2012 ===
The orchestra first performed on October 9, 2012, in the small town of Kanjiža (Hungarian: Magyarkanizsa) in the Banat. The Banat no longer exists as a political entity, but is currently divided between three countries — Romania, Serbia and Hungary. The region is noted for its diversity of population, languages and cultures. Also emblematic was the choice of the musical program — Prokofiev's Classical Symphony, Ives' The Unanswered Question and Kodály's Dances of Galánta.

Two days later, the orchestra inaugurated the Belgrade Music Festival with the same program, just adding Beethovens Fifth Piano Concerto with Hinrich Alpers as soloist. Public and critics were stunned, the brand-new orchestra performed as if it had been in existence for decades: "On a specially arranged stage, in a whirlpool of electricity, in the audience vibrating with different generations and sensibilities, gathered for the event as if from an unknown planet and deeply immerged in expecting miracles of sounds, we finally met the No Borders Orchestra," wrote Zorica Kojić of the daily newspaper, Danas.

=== 2013 ===
The orchestra's 2013 season started on March 16 at the Novi Sad Synagogue with Žebeljans The Horses of Saint Mark, followed by an orchestral version of Albéniz' Iberia with soloist Edin Karamazov (guitar) and, again, Kodály. The next night, the program was repeated in Belgrade. In August, the orchestra toured several festivals in former Yugoslavia — Kotor and Herceg Novi, both in Montenegro, Trebinje in Bosnia and Herzegovina, as well as in Ljubljana in Slovenia. The soloist this time was the renowned guitarist Miloš Karadaglić in Rodrigo's Concierto de Aranjuez. Stanko Madic, the first violin player of the orchestra, noted of their performance in Trebinje:

"In an environment that is extremely nationalistic, we were greeted with significant distrust since we have several Albanian musicians from Kosovo. But at the end of the concert, the audience reacted with standing ovations. They did not only accept the Albanians who were playing in their city, but numerous people at the city square also listened very carefully to the demanding classical music programme in a city where no symphony orchestra has performed before."

In October the same year, the ensemble played Schubert's Unfinished Symphony, Richard Wagner's Siegfried Idyll and again Kodály's Dances of Galánta at the Cathedral of Saint Mother Teresa in Pristina. Ten days later, the orchestra first appeared on an international stage. at the Radialsystem V in Berlin, with Žebeljan, Wagner, Kodály and Auerbach's Sogno di Stabat Mater.

=== The First Opera ===
In 2014, Premil Petrović was invited to conduct Brett Bailey's new production of Verdi's Macbeth in Cape Town where he conducted a local orchestra. During the preparation of Macbeth, the conductor quoted the Serbian performance artist, Marina Abramović, to explain his frame of reference: "She said, 'It's not important what you are doing, it's important from which state of mind you are doing it." He explained his uneasiness with Verdi's opera: "This is very rare. I cannot remember any other opera without love. There is only power, greed, hatred, crime and revenge. […] Between Macbeth and Lady Macbeth, there is no love at all. They support each other… strategically." Nevertheless, the premiere was very well received.

The NBO took over for the European tour of this production starting with festival performances in Brussels, Rotterdam and at the Vienna Festival. Together with the South African singers, the conductor and orchestra received acclaim from critics and standing ovations from audiences during the run in Vienna. The tour went on to Montpellier, the German Festival Theaterformen in Braunschweig, the Barbican Centre in London, Lisbon, Catalan Gerona, as well as to the French cities of Tarbes, Toulouse and Strasbourg. It concluded in November at the Festival d’Automne in Paris.

The NBO is funded by the European Festivals Association.
