= Sakchai Makao =

Thailand native

Sakchai Makao is a Thailand native who moved in 1993 to the islands of Shetland in Scotland. Sakchai was 10 years old at the time. In 2004 Sakchai was involved in crime which led to him being charged and convicted of "wilful fire-raising". In 2006, at the age of 23, Sakchai was detained under the UK Immigration Act during a dawn raid of his house by police and immigration officers in Lerwick (Shetland). He was immediately transported to the Scottish mainland at a facility in Aberdeen to be held until a deportation hearing could be held.

Sakchai was an accomplished athlete, competing for Shetland, as well as Scotland at a national level. At the time of his detention he was working as a lifeguard at a local recreation facility.

In 2006, the Home Office started a campaign to request the deportation of immigrants with criminal records. When Sakchai was threatened with deportation in 2006, the people of Shetland came together to support him. The 'Shetland for Sakchai' campaign was started, with over 8,000 people from numerous countries signing petitions to release him. Fundraising events were held to pay his legal costs, and there was much publicity and support in the local, national and international press. The Shetlink community website hosted a petition, information point and discussion forum during the campaign.

Eventually Sakchai was freed on bail on 20 June 2006. A hearing on 7 July 2006 saw Sakchai's appeal being upheld, and Sakchai was free to return to Shetland.

The 'Shetland for Sakchai' campaign won 'Public Campaign of the Year' at the Scottish Politician of the Year awards and the 'Willie Leitch Trophy' for 'Campaign of the Year' (presented by the Aberdeen Central Liberal Democrats)
