= Garscadden Wood =

Woodland in Glasgow, Scotland

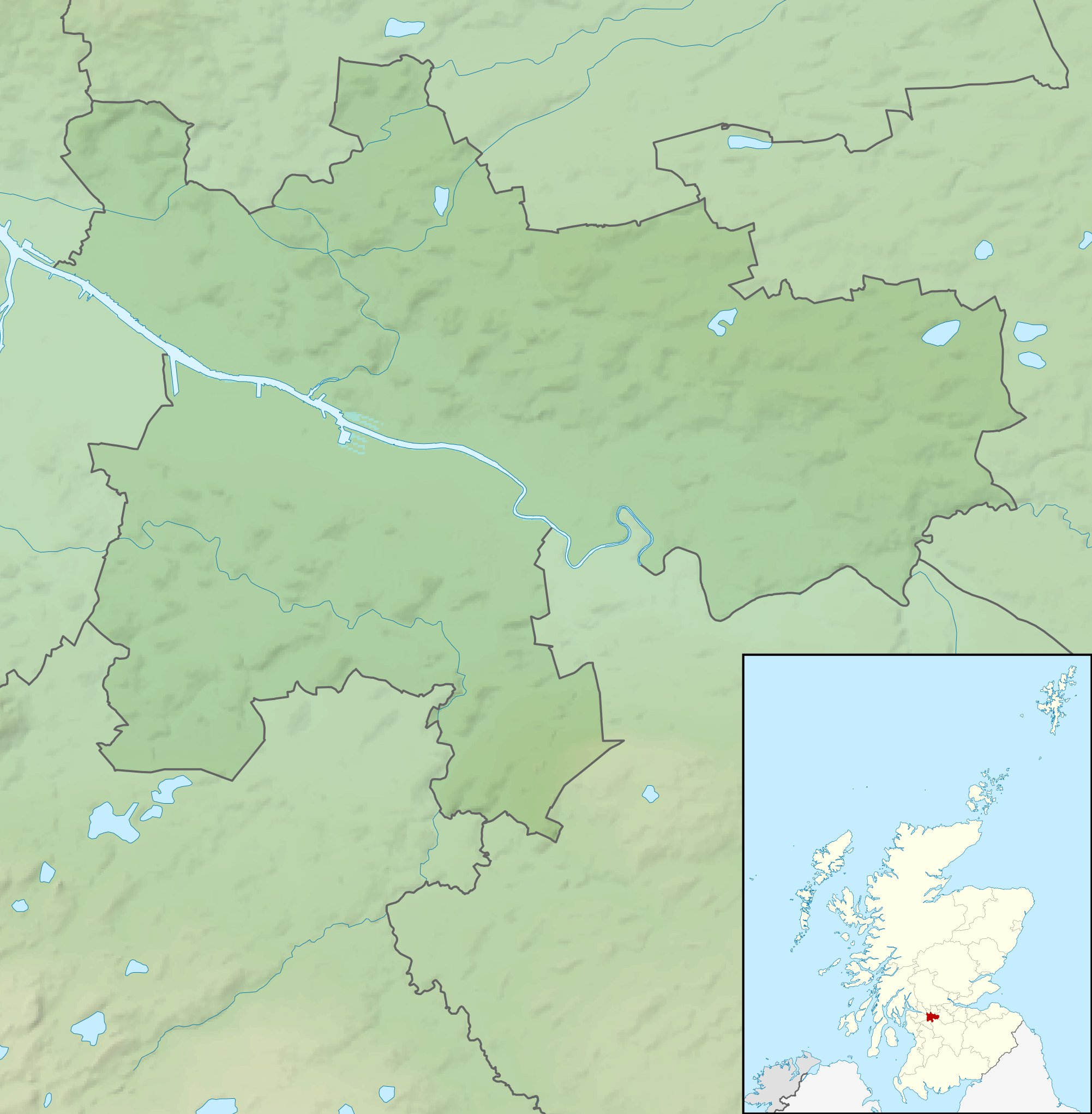
- Location within Glasgow council area
- Location: Drumchapel, Glasgow, Scotland
- Nearest city: Glasgow
- Coordinates: 55.91853°N 4.35539°W
- Designation: Local nature reserve
- Established: 2006
- Operator: Glasgow City Council

Garscadden Wood is a woodland and local nature reserve in Drumchapel, on the north-western edge of Glasgow, Scotland. It lies close to the boundary between Glasgow and East Dunbartonshire, near Bearsden, and is known locally as the Bluebell Woods because of the bluebells that flower there in spring.

The wood is one of Glasgow's older semi-natural woodlands and was declared a local nature reserve in 2006. It forms part of the Drumchapel woodlands and is used for walking, cycling, nature study and informal recreation.

== Location ==
Garscadden Wood lies north of Drumchapel and south of Bearsden Golf Course. The reserve is divided into eastern and western sections by Peel Glen Road. It can be accessed from Peel Glen Road, Drummore Road, Ladyloan Avenue and Monymusk Place.

The woodland is close to the northern boundary of Glasgow with East Dunbartonshire. The north-western edge of the area is near the line of the Antonine Wall. The Ordnance Survey grid reference for the wood is grid reference NS529720.

== Description ==
Garscadden Wood is a broadleaved woodland containing many old oak trees. The local nature reserve includes older woodland to the east of Peel Glen Road and newer plantation woodland to the west. The Woodland Trust describes the wider Drumchapel Woodlands as three wooded sites within the former Garscadden Estate, with paths used by walkers, cyclists and riders.

The wood is locally known as the Bluebell Woods. Bluebells are one of its best-known seasonal features, particularly in late spring.

== Wildlife ==
Garscadden Wood is noted for the purple hairstreak butterfly, a species associated with oak woodland.

Other wildlife recorded in the wood includes common woodland birds, roe deer and red fox. Glasgow Natural History Society also notes that the older woodland was the site of the first recorded sighting in Glasgow of the purple hairstreak butterfly and that nationally notable beetles have been recorded there.

== Conservation ==
Garscadden Wood was declared a local nature reserve in 2006. Local nature reserves in Glasgow are managed to protect habitats and species, improve public access, encourage environmental education and support community involvement.

The local nature reserve is owned by Glasgow City Council. For a period, it was one of the Glasgow local nature reserves managed by Forestry Commission Scotland through a ten-year lease with the council; management later returned to the council.

== Recreation ==
Garscadden Wood is used by local residents for walking and informal recreation. The wider Drumchapel Woodlands contain a number of paths, some of which are waymarked, and are used by walkers, cyclists and riders.

== See also ==
- Drumchapel
- Bearsden
- Antonine Wall
- Local nature reserve
- List of places in Glasgow
