= West Coast Magazine =

Discontinued Scottish publication

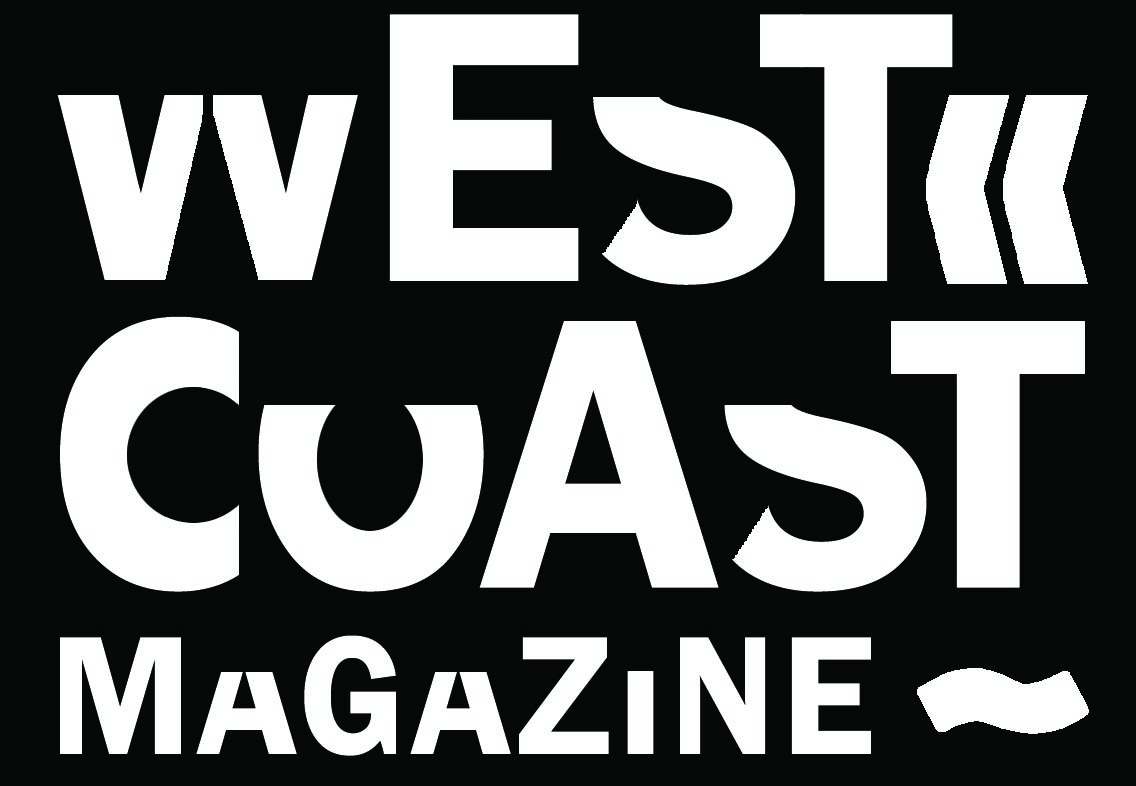

West Coast Magazine (1987–1998) was a three times a year Scottish literary publication consisting of poetry, short fiction, articles, essays and reviews. Founding editors were Gordon Giles, Kenny MacKenzie and Joe Murray. The proof issue appeared in October 1987 and contained some articles and poems that did not appear in official issues. West Coast Magazine (WCM) was initially funded by East Glasgow Gear Project and Glasgow City Council; ultimately funded by the Scottish Arts Council.

WCM was probably the first Scottish literary magazine fully produced pre-press in-house to a professional standard, and was the forerunner, in this sense, for many similar Scottish literary publications that came after it. The main aim of West Coast was to help promote new writing, and more specifically, new writers in Scotland. However, it did not exclusively publish Scottish writers or writers resident in Scotland – writers from all over the world contributed to its content. Established writers such as Alasdair Gray (short fiction and poetry), Agnes Owens (short fiction and poetry), Janice Galloway (short fiction), Freddie Anderson, (articles and poetry), Alison Prince (poetry), Dominic Behan (poetry), James Kelman (interview and article), Jeff Torrington (short fiction), Kenneth White (poetry, articles), all of whom also provided great encouragement to the project. New writers who were beginning to produce works of note were featured, such as: Des Dillon (short fiction and poetry), Brian Whittingham (poetry), Jim Ferguson (short fiction and poetry), Irvine Welsh (short fiction) and Graham Fulton (poetry), and Andrew M Forster (poetry) among others.

WCM Production Team: John Cunningham (Proof-reader, Distribution and Reviewer), Jan Dalton (Administration, Proof-reader and Reviewer), Maud Devine (Proof-reader and Distribution), Gordon Giles (Typesetting, Layout and Reviewer), Kenny MacKenzie (Typesetting, Layout and Reviewer), Alan Mason (Design), Joe Murray (Typesetting, Layout and Reviewer), Tam O'Hara (Word Processing), Ellen Shearer (Word Processing).

WCM Editorial Staff: due to work commitments Joe Murray left the magazine after helping to complete Issue Three but returned after the publication of Issue Four. Issue three was, essentially a double issue, but not published as such. Gordon Giles left during production of Issue Six to pursue a career in Community Education; leaving Kenny and Joe as editors. From Issue Nine till Issue Thirteen an editorial board chose most of the work for the magazine freeing up Joe and Kenny to pursue the creation of a new small publishing company called Media Bridge Ltd* in West Nile Street, Glasgow, which took on the production of West Coast Magazine. The editorial group consisted of Margaret Fulton Cook editor and for around two years, during this time John Cunningham, Graham Fulton, Ronnie Smith and Brian Whittingham were the editorial board with Joe Murray as managing editor. In 1992 the editorial board was disbanded and from Issue Fifteen through to 28, when West Coast Magazine ended, Joe Murray was managing editor with Brian Whittingham editor and Alan Mason as designer.

WCM also produced many writers' events such as readings and talks – mainly in pubs and other public places – and produced all but one of the literary events for Glasgow's City of Culture festival in 1990.

All of the poetry and poetry reviews published in West Coast Magazine can be found on the Scottish Poetry Library's website

- In 1991 Media Bridge Limited was formed by "WCM" editors, Joe Murray and Kenny MacKenzie – both of whom became directors of the company – West Coast Magazine became an imprint of Media Bridge with Kenny MacKenzie remaining a consultant editor. Media Bridge created the imprints: Taranis Books for fiction and Sirona Press for poetry. Sirona Press was never used for publishing and consequently all books were published under the Taranis imprint. The first six books published by Media Bridge Ltd were produced by Joe Murray with cover designs by Alan Mason. The company was successfully managed throughout that period by Kenny MacKenzie.

Joe Murray left Media Bridge in 1992 to form the publishing design company, EM-DEE Productions, and WCM became an imprint of that company. After a dispute with Scottish Arts Council around how it funded small publishers, "WCM" published the final double issue (27–28) in 1998. Under the guidance of Kenny MacKenzie, Taranis Books went on to publish over two-dozen books before being put to sleep in 2000.
