= United Refugee Organization =

United Refugee Organization in Leeds

The United Refugee Organization is a non profit freelance organisation whose aim is to foster unity and promote forums, good will, and cohesive interactions between refugees from all backgrounds. It is a refugee body whose other objective is to help exhibit relevant information to Refugees in need and a sharing platform on numerous issues affecting them. It was initially formed by a group of refugees in Leeds who despite their refugeeship entered into humanitarian voluntary actions like with organisations like Refugee Council, Leeds Noborder and other refugee endeavours. It was first known as Iranian Refugee Organization in Leeds(IROL/BIMARZ network) after which it consequently metamorphosed into (URO).

== See also ==
- Immigration
- Refugee
- No Border network
- No person is illegal
