= Firing at a vehicle =

Firing at a vehicle is a controversial practice in which a person discharges a gun at an automobile. Many police departments, including those of New York City, Virginia Beach, and Prince William County, Virginia, have rules specifically banning officers from engaging in it, even when the officer is about to be run down by the vehicle. Firing at a vehicle is viewed as being generally ineffective and posing many risks. For instance, the bullet may go through the car windows and strike an innocent bystander on the other side. Not only that, but firing at an automobile may bounce the bullet back at the officer, if the metal is strong enough.
