= Scottish Politician of the Year =

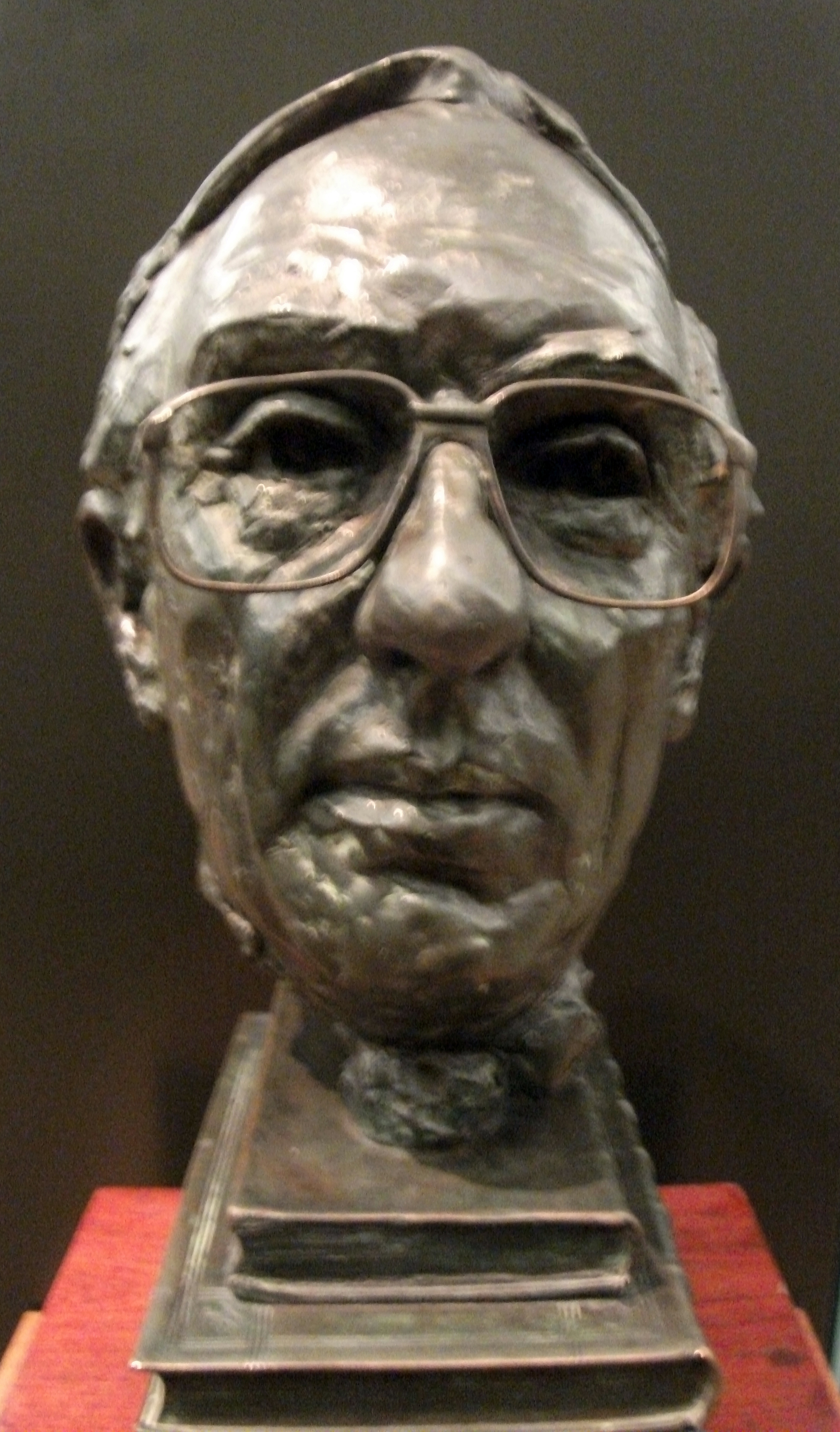
Head of Donald Dewar in the Kelvingrove Art Gallery and Museum, Glasgow

Scottish Politician of the Year is an annual awards ceremony established in 1999. It is held by The Herald newspaper in Prestonfield House, Edinburgh.

Although the initial awards ceremony in 1999 was held at the National Museum of Scotland, Prestonfield House Hotel is considered to be the home of the event, hosting every ceremony since 2000. At the 2004 ceremony, former Labour MP, MSP and life peer Mike Watson, set fire to a curtain, and was subsequently convicted of wilful fire raising.

Not all of the subsidiary awards are handed out every year.

== Winners ==
=== Main award: Scottish Politician of the Year ===
- 2025: John Swinney MSP, Scottish National Party, First Minister
- 2024: Anas Sarwar MSP, Labour
- 2023: Dame Jackie Baillie MSP, Labour
- 2022: Anas Sarwar MSP, Labour
- 2021: no award
- 2020: no award
- 2019: Nicola Sturgeon MSP, Scottish National Party, First Minister
- 2018: Jeane Freeman MSP, Scottish National Party, Cabinet Secretary for Health and Sport
- 2017: Ruth Davidson MSP, Scottish Conservative and Unionist party
- 2016: Ruth Davidson MSP, Scottish Conservative and Unionist party
- 2015: Nicola Sturgeon MSP, Scottish National Party, First Minister
- 2014: Nicola Sturgeon MSP, Scottish National Party, First Minister
- 2013: Alex Salmond MSP, Scottish National Party, First Minister
- 2012: Nicola Sturgeon MSP, Scottish National Party, Deputy First Minister
- 2011: Alex Salmond MSP, Scottish National Party, First Minister
- 2010: Hugh Henry MSP, Labour, back-bencher, convenor of Public Audit Committee
- 2009: John Swinney MSP, Scottish National Party, Cabinet Secretary for Finance and Sustainable Growth
- 2008: Nicola Sturgeon MSP, Scottish National Party, Deputy First Minister
- 2007: Alex Salmond MSP MP, Scottish National Party, First Minister
- 2006: Andy Kerr MSP, Labour, Minister for Health and Community Care
- 2005: George Reid MSP, Scottish National Party, Presiding Officer of the Scottish Parliament
- 2004: Margaret Curran MSP, Labour, Minister for Communities
- 2003: George Reid MSP, Scottish National Party, Presiding Officer of the Scottish Parliament
- 2002: Malcolm Chisholm MSP, Labour, Minister for Health and Community Care
- 2001: Jack McConnell MSP, Labour, First Minister
- 2000: Jim Wallace MSP MP, Liberal Democrats, Deputy First Minister
- 1999: Donald Dewar MSP, MP, Labour, First Minister

=== Best Scot at Westminster ===
- 2025: Brian Leishman MP, Labour
- 2024: Ian Murray MP, Labour, Secretary of State for Scotland
- 2023: Alister Jack MP, Conservative and Unionist, Secretary of State for Scotland
- 2022: Stewart McDonald MP, Scottish National Party
- 2021: no award
- 2020: no award
- 2019: Joanna Cherry MP, Scottish National Party
- 2018: Paul Sweeney MP, Labour and Co-operative, Shadow Under-Secretary of State for Scotland
- 2017: Alison Thewliss MP, Scottish National Party
- 2016: David Mundell MP, Conservative and Unionist, Secretary of State for Scotland
- 2015: Angus Robertson MP, Scottish National Party Parliamentary Group Leader in Westminster
- 2014: Gordon Brown MP, Labour
- 2013: Douglas Alexander MP, Labour
- 2012: Michael Moore MP, Liberal Democrats, Secretary of State for Scotland
- 2011: Angus Robertson MP, Scottish National Party Parliamentary Group Leader in Westminster and shadow minister for Defence and Foreign Affairs
- 2010: Jim Murphy MP, Labour, Shadow Secretary of State for Defence
- 2009: Jim Murphy MP, Labour, Secretary of State for Scotland
- 2008: Alistair Darling MP, Labour, Chancellor of the Exchequer
- 2007: Gordon Brown MP, Labour, Prime Minister
- 2006: Angus MacNeil MP, Scottish National Party, for instigating the Metropolitan Police investigation into the Cash for Honours scandal
- 2005: Des Browne MP, Labour, Chief Secretary to the Treasury
- 2004: Menzies Campbell MP, Deputy Leader of the Liberal Democrats and Lib Dem Foreign Affairs Spokesman
- 2003: Robin Cook MP, Labour, President of the Party of European Socialists; backbencher after his resignation as Lord President of the Council and Leader of the House of Commons on 17 March 2003 in protest against the invasion of Iraq
- 2002: Alistair Darling MP, Labour, Secretary of State for Transport
- 2001: John Reid MP, Labour, Secretary of State for Northern Ireland
- 2000: Gordon Brown MP, Labour, Chancellor of the Exchequer
- 1999: Gordon Brown MP, Labour, Chancellor of the Exchequer

=== Debater of the Year, since 2001 renamed Donald Dewar Debater of the Year ===
- 2025: Elena Whitham MSP, Scottish National Party
- 2024: Humza Yousaf MSP, Scottish National Party
- 2023: Jamie Greene MSP, Conservative and Unionist
- 2022: Anas Sarwar MSP, Labour
- 2021: no award
- 2020: no award
- 2019: Jackson Carlaw MSP, Conservative and Unionist
- 2018: Michael Russell MSP, Scottish National Party
- 2017: Kezia Dugdale MSP, Labour
- 2016: Ruth Davidson MSP, Conservative and Unionist
- 2015: Willie Rennie MSP, Liberal Democrats
- 2014: Ruth Davidson MSP, Conservative and Unionist
- 2013: Johann Lamont MSP, Labour
- 2012: Dennis Robertson MSP, Scottish National Party
- 2011: Nicola Sturgeon MSP, Scottish National Party
- 2010: Derek Brownlee MSP, Conservative and Unionist
- 2009: John Swinney MSP, Scottish National Party
- 2008: Nicola Sturgeon MSP, Scottish National Party
- 2007: John Swinney MSP, Scottish National Party
- 2006: Tavish Scott MSP, Liberal Democrats
- 2005: Alex Neil MSP, Scottish National Party
- 2004: Nicola Sturgeon MSP, Scottish National Party
- 2003: David McLetchie MSP, Conservative and Unionist
- 2002: David McLetchie MSP, Conservative and Unionist
- 2001: Tommy Sheridan MSP, Scottish Socialist Party
- 2000: Michael Russell MSP, Scottish National Party
- 1999: Frank McAveety MSP, Labour

=== Politics in Business ===
- 2025: Kate Forbes MSP, Scottish National Party, Deputy First Minister
- 2024: Kate Forbes MSP, Scottish National Party, Deputy First Minister
- 2023: Fergus Ewing MSP, Scottish National Party
- 2022: Ivan McKee MSP, Scottish National Party
- 2021: no award
- 2020: no award
- 2019: Derek Mackay MSP, Scottish National Party
- 2018: Murdo Fraser MSP, Conservative and Unionist
- 2017: Murdo Fraser MSP, Conservative and Unionist
- 2016: Fergus Ewing MSP, Scottish National Party
- 2015: Gavin Brown MSP, Conservative and Unionist
- 2014: Fergus Ewing MSP, Scottish National Party
- 2013: Richard Lochhead MSP, Scottish National Party, Cabinet Secretary for Rural Affairs and the Environment

=== Public Campaign/Campaigner of the Year ===
- 2025: For Women Scotland
- 2024: Linda Allan, Stuart Allan and Scott Allan for campaign to reform HMYOI Polmont
- 2023: Public inquiry into NHS Tayside over the Eljamel scandal and Liz Smith MSP, Conservative and Unionist
- 2022: Back Off Scotland and Gillian Mackay MSP, Scottish Green Party
- 2021: no award
- 2020: no award
- 2019: British Heart Foundation for the Nation of Lifesavers campaign
- 2018: Gillian Murray
- 2017: Amanda Kopel, Frank's Law
- 2016: NO2NP
- 2015: Gordon Aikman – Gordon's Fightback
- 2014: Coalition for Continuing Care – Barnardo's Scotland, Aberlour Childcare Trust and WhoCares? Scotland
- 2012: Shelter Scotland
- 2012: Martha Payne, blogger and campaigner
- 2011 - 2 awards: RAF Lossiemouth and Frank Maguire, lawyer and campaigner (posthumous award)
- 2010: Ann Moulds, anti-stalking
- 2008: Clydeside Action on Asbestos
- 2007: Farepak savers' campaign
- 2006: Campaign to block the deportation of Sakchai Makao to Thailand
- 2005: Glasgow Girls, a group of young women who highlighted the situation of asylum seekers
- 2004: Özlem and David Grimason, the parents of a baby - Alistair Grimason - killed by gunfire in Turkey: campaigned for a change in Turkish gun laws
- 2003: Margo MacDonald MSP, Independent
- 2002: Margo MacDonald MSP, Scottish National Party
- 2001: no award
- 2000: no award
- 1999: no award

=== Councillor/Local Government Politician of the Year ===
- 2025: Willie Scobie, Independent, Dumfries and Galloway Council
- 2024: Fiona Hennebry, Labour, West Dunbartonshire Council
- 2023: Katie Hagmann, Scottish National Party, Dumfries and Galloway Council and Convention of Scottish Local Authorities
- 2022: Stephen McCabe, Labour, Leader of Inverclyde Council
- 2021: no award
- 2020: no award
- 2019: Susan Aitken, Scottish National Party, Leader of Glasgow City Council
- 2018: John Alexander, Scottish National Party, Leader of Dundee City Council
- 2017: Jenny Laing, Labour, co-leader of Aberdeen City Council
- 2016: Mark Macmillan, Labour, Leader of Renfrewshire Council
- 2015: David Parker, Scottish Borders Council
- 2014: Gordon Matheson, Labour, Leader of Glasgow City Council
- 2013: The three leaders of the Island councils:
  - Steven Heddle, Independent, Orkney Islands Council
  - Gary Robinson, Independent, Shetland Islands Council
  - Councillor Angus Campbell, Independent, Comhairle nan Eilean Siar (Outer Hebrides)
- 2012: Gordon Matheson, Labour, Leader of Glasgow City Council
- 2011: Michael Foxley, Liberal Democrats, Highland Council
- 2010: Pat Watters, Labour, Convention of Scottish Local Authorities
- 2009: Steven Purcell, Labour, Leader of Glasgow City Council

=== e-Politician of the Year ===
- 2025: no award
- 2024: no award
- 2023: no award
- 2022: Sandesh Gulhane MSP, Conservative and Unionist
- 2021: no award
- 2020: no award
- 2019: Murdo Fraser MSP, Conservative and Unionist
- 2018: Nicola Sturgeon MSP, Scottish National Party, First Minister
- 2017: Ruth Davidson MSP, Conservative and Unionist
- 2016: Johann Lamont MSP, Labour
- 2015: Ruth Davidson MSP, Conservative and Unionist
- 2014: Nicola Sturgeon MSP, Scottish National Party, First Minister
- 2013: Patrick Harvie, MSP, Scottish Green Party

=== Lifetime Achievement Award/Outstanding Political Achievement ===
- 2025: George Robertson, former Secretary of State for Defence and Secretary General of NATO
- 2024: Annabel Goldie, former leader of the Scottish Conservative and Unionist Party
- 2023: Lord John McFall, Labour, Lord Speaker
- 2022: Elish Angiolini
- 2021: no award
- 2020: no award
- 2019: Sir Paul Grice, Chief Executive of the Scottish Parliament
- 2018: no award
- 2017: no award
- 2016: Menzies Campbell, Liberal Democrats
- 2015: no award
- 2014: Alistair Darling MP, Labour
- 2013: Rt Hon Sir George Reid, former Presiding Officer
- 2012: no award
- 2011 - 2 awards: Gordon Brown MP, Labour; and Joe Quinn, former Scottish Political Editor of the Press Association
- 2010: Jack McConnell MSP, Labour, First Minister 2001 - 2007
- 2008: Jim Wallace, former leader of the Scottish Liberal Democrats
- 2007: Margo MacDonald MSP, Independent
- 2006: no award
- 2005: Robin Cook MP, Labour (posthumous award)
- 2004: Tam Dalyell MP, Labour
- 2002: Winnie Ewing MSP, Scottish National Party
- 2001: David Steel MSP, Liberal Democrats
- 2000: Alex Salmond MSP MP, Scottish National Party
- 1999: no award

=== Committee/Committee Member(s) of the Year ===
- 2025: Douglas Ross MSP, Conservative and Unionist
- 2024: Jackson Carlaw MSP, Conservative and Unionist
- 2023: Kenneth Gibson MSP, Scottish National Party
- 2022: Richard Leonard MSP, Labour
- 2021: no award
- 2020: no award
- 2019: Edward Mountain MSP, Conservative and Unionist
- 2018: Bruce Crawford MSP, Scottish National Party, Finance and Constitution Committee
- 2017: Alex Neil MSP, Scottish National Party
- 2016: Mary Scanlon MSP, Conservative and Unionist
- 2015: Alison McInnes MSP, Liberal Democrats
- 2014: Hugh Henry MSP, Labour
- 2012: no award
- 2011: no award
- 2010: Public Accounts Committee
- 2009: Public Accounts Committee
- 2008: Bill Aitken MSP, Conservative and Unionist, for convenership of the Justice Committee
- 2007: no award
- 2006: Justice 1 Committee
- 2005: Finance Committee
- 2004: Des McNulty MSP, Labour
- 2003: John McAllion MSP and Michael McMahon MSP, both Labour, Petitions Committee
- 2002: Mike Rumbles MSP, Liberal Democrats
- 2001: John McAllion MSP, Labour
- 2000: Gordon Jackson MSP, Labour
- 1999: no award

=== Community MSP of the Year ===
- 2025: Michael Marra MSP, Labour
- 2024: Ross Greer MSP, Scottish Greens
- 2023: Fergus Ewing MSP, Scottish National Party
- 2022: Paul Sweeney MSP, Labour and Co-operative
- 2021: no award
- 2020: no award
- 2019: Jackie Baillie MSP, Labour
- 2018: Anas Sarwar MSP, Labour
- 2017: Andy Wightman MSP, Green Party
- 2016: Jackie Baillie MSP, Labour
- 2015: Neil Findlay MSP, Labour
- 2014: John Finnie MSP, Independent

=== 240th Anniversary of The Herald Award (2023) ===
- Brian Taylor, former BBC Scotland political editor

=== Judges Award (2014 only) ===
- Gordon Aikman

=== One to Watch/Award for Progress ===
- 2025: Màiri McAllan MSP, Scottish National Party
- 2024: Kirsty McNeill MP, Labour
- 2023: Michael Marra MSP, Labour
- 2022: Neil Gray MSP, Scottish National Party
- 2021: no award
- 2020: no award
- 2019: Ross Greer MSP, Scottish Greens
- 2018: Kate Forbes MSP, Scottish National Party
- 2017: Monica Lennon MSP, Labour
- 2016: Alex Cole-Hamilton MSP, Liberal Democrats
- 2015: no award
- 2014: no award
- 2013: Kezia Dugdale MSP, Labour
- 2012: Humza Yousaf MSP, Scottish National Party
- 2011: no award
- 2010: Shirley-Anne Somerville MSP, Scottish National Party
- 2009: Gavin Brown MSP, Conservative and Unionist
- 2008: John Park MSP, Labour
- 2007: Derek Brownlee MSP, Conservative and Unionist
- 2006: Parliamentary group of 7 Scottish Green Party MSPs
- 2005: Wendy Alexander MSP, Labour
- 2004: Patrick Harvie MSP, Green
- 2003: Rosie Kane MSP, Scottish Socialist Party
- 2002: no award
- 2001: Christine Grahame MSP, Scottish National Party
- 2000: Tavish Scott MSP, Liberal Democrats
- 1999: Tricia Marwick MSP, Scottish National Party

=== Green Champion ===
- 2025: Kate Forbes MSP, Scottish National Party, Deputy First Minister
- 2024: Lorna Slater MSP, Scottish Greens

=== Political Impact of the Year (2011-2013 only) ===
- 2013: Kenny MacAskill MSP, Scottish National Party, Cabinet Secretary for Justice
- 2012: Johann Lamont MSP, Labour
- 2011: Murdo Fraser MSP, Conservative and Unionist

=== Newcomer of the Year (2011 only) ===
- Ruth Davidson MSP, Conservative and Unionist

=== Free Spirit/Maverick of the Year (2000-2008 only) ===
- 2008: Chris Harvie MSP, Scottish National Party
- 2007: Christine Grahame MSP, Scottish National Party
- 2006: Karen Gillon MSP, Labour
- 2005: Brian Monteith MSP, Independent
- 2004: Kenny MacAskill MSP, Scottish National Party
- 2003: John Farquhar Munro MSP, Liberal Democrats
- 2002: Elaine Smith MSP, Labour
- 2001: Donald Gorrie MSP, Liberal Democrats
- 2000: Margo MacDonald MSP, Scottish National Party

=== International Scot Award (2007 and 2008 only) ===
- 2008: Sir Sean Connery
- 2007: Sir Tom Hunter

=== Scottish Euro MP of the Year (2000-2003 only) ===
- 2003: Prof Sir Neil MacCormick MEP, Scottish National Party
- 2002: Prof Sir Neil MacCormick MEP, Scottish National Party
- 2001: David Martin MEP, Labour
- 2000: Prof Sir Neil MacCormick MEP, Scottish National Party

=== Election Performance of the Year (2003 only) ===
- Scottish Green Party

=== Front Bencher of the Year (1999 only) ===
- Susan Deacon MSP, Labour

=== Back Bencher of the Year (1999 only) ===
- Donald Gorrie MSP, Liberal Democrats

== Sources ==
- Nicoll, Ruaridh (20 November 2005). "Well-earned gongs".
- "Salmond crowned Scottish politician of the year". The Herald. 11 November 2011.
- "Alex Salmond named the Herald's Scottish Politician of Year". BBC News. 15 November 2013.
- "Nicola Sturgeon named the Herald's Scottish Politician of Year". BBC News. 21 November 2014.
