= Siva reka =

- Village
- Location within Bulgaria
- Coordinates: 41°47′N 26°04′E
- Country: Bulgaria
- Province: Haskovo Province
- Municipality: Svilengrad
- Time zone: UTC+2 (EET)
  - Summer (DST): UTC+3 (EEST)

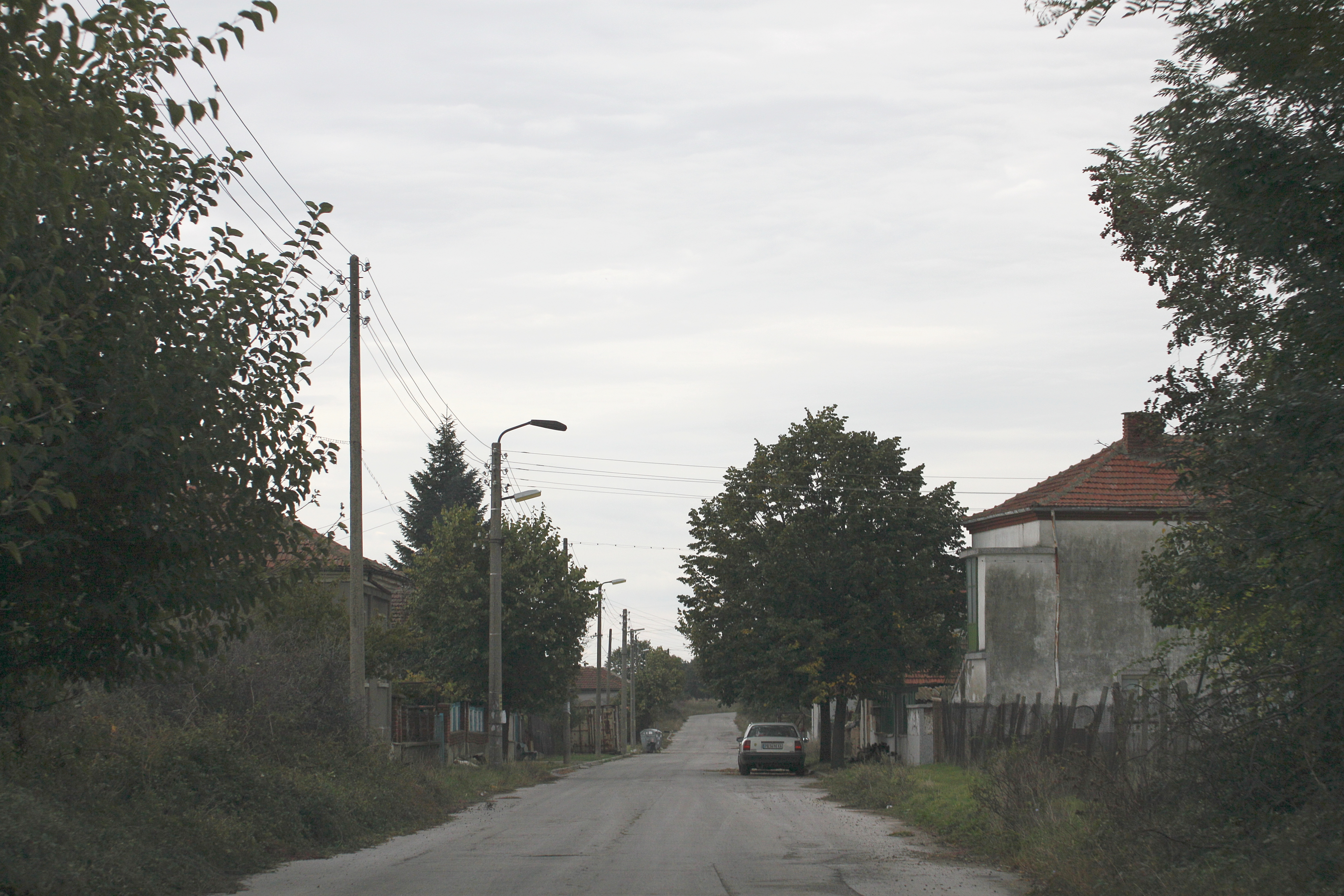
Siva reka

Siva reka is a village in the municipality of Svilengrad, in Haskovo Province, in southern Bulgaria.
