= Dungavel Immigration Removal Centre =

Immigration detention facility in Scotland

Coordinates: 55.609°N 4.132°W

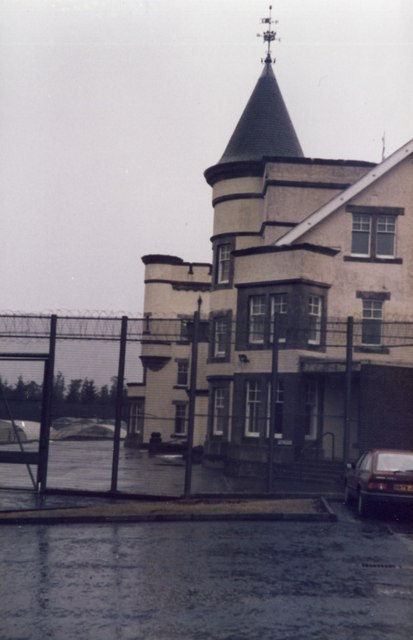
Dungavel, 1987

Dungavel Immigration Removal Centre is an immigration detention facility in South Lanarkshire, Scotland, near the town of Strathaven in a building that is also known as Dungavel Castle or Dungavel House. It is operated by Mitie Care and Custody, under contract with the law-enforcement command Immigration Enforcement for its detention of immigrants for the Home Office. It is the only such facility in Scotland.

The announced closure of Dungavel in September 2016 was rescinded in February 2017, with a planned replacement cancelled and Dungavel to remain open.

== History ==
Originally a 19th-century hunting lodge and summer retreat of the Dukes of Hamilton linked to their then main house at Hamilton Palace. The 13th Duke of Hamilton preferred to stay there rather than the palace which he let out to be used as a convalescent home for injured soldiers and sailors in the Great War. Following this, in 1919, the palace was demolished due to subsidence from mining in the area, ironically from mines which provided the Duke with a healthy income.

Dungavel was the planned destination for Rudolf Hess's doomed 1941 peace mission, to seek the intercession of the 14th Duke of Hamilton with Churchill to try to end the war between Britain and Germany. Dungavel was sold on to the National Coal Board in 1947. It was then acquired by the government and turned into an open prison.

In 1979 Agnes Curran became the governor of Dungavel prison. She was the first female prison governor of a prison for men in Britain. Curran was surprised to be appointed and she had to deal with the attitudes taken by male staff and prisoners to a woman governor. She was made a Member of the Order of the British Empire in 1984.

In 2001 its role changed and it is used for holding asylum seekers whose applications have been refused prior to their removal. It however, remains the final resting place for the 13th Duke, a naval officer whose grave lies within the close policies of the castle, once adorned with a ship's anchor.

== Current use ==
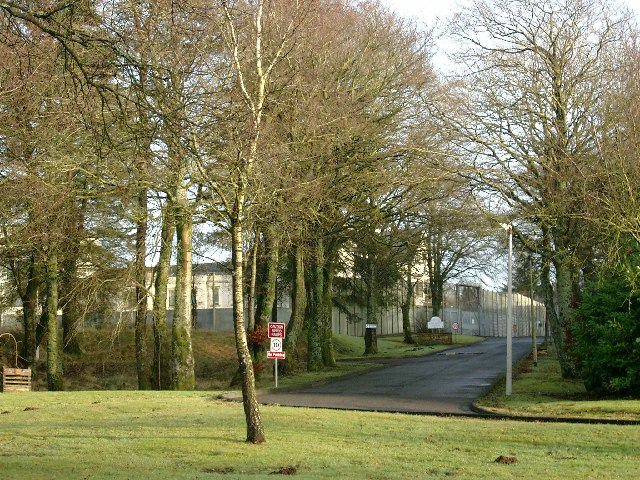
Dungavel, 2006

Dungavel opened as an immigrant detention centre in 2001. Under the management of operator Mitie Care and Custody the facility was expanded in 2013 to 249 detainees, men and women, in "four main residential units". This was GEO Group's only prison in the United Kingdom before being taken over by Mitie Care and Custody in 2022.

Dungavel has been the scene of several protests on the basis that babies and young children have been held there prior to deportation, in some cases for over a year. The Kurdish Ay family, consisting of Yurdugal Ay and her four children aged 7 to 14, were held in Dungavel in a single room for 13 months before eventually gaining asylum in Germany. In 2003 lawyer Aamer Anwar led a campaign over the detention of the Ays. Over the years Aamer Anwar has continued to call for Dungavel to be shut down, describing it as inhumane and barbaric as well as a 'scar on the face of Scotland.' In January 2012 the Home Office agreed to pay the four Ay children a 6-figure settlement, following a civil action against the UK government for the ordeal of their time in detention.

In 2004 the Children's Commissioner for Scotland described the facility as "morally upsetting" and threatened to report the UK and Scottish Governments to the United Nations Committee on the Rights of the Child. However, former Home Secretary David Blunkett said that "Detention, while regrettable, is an essential part of effective immigration control - to effect removal, establish identity or prevent absconding. Where it is necessary to detain individuals with children, we believe it is better that the children remain with their parents rather than split up the family".

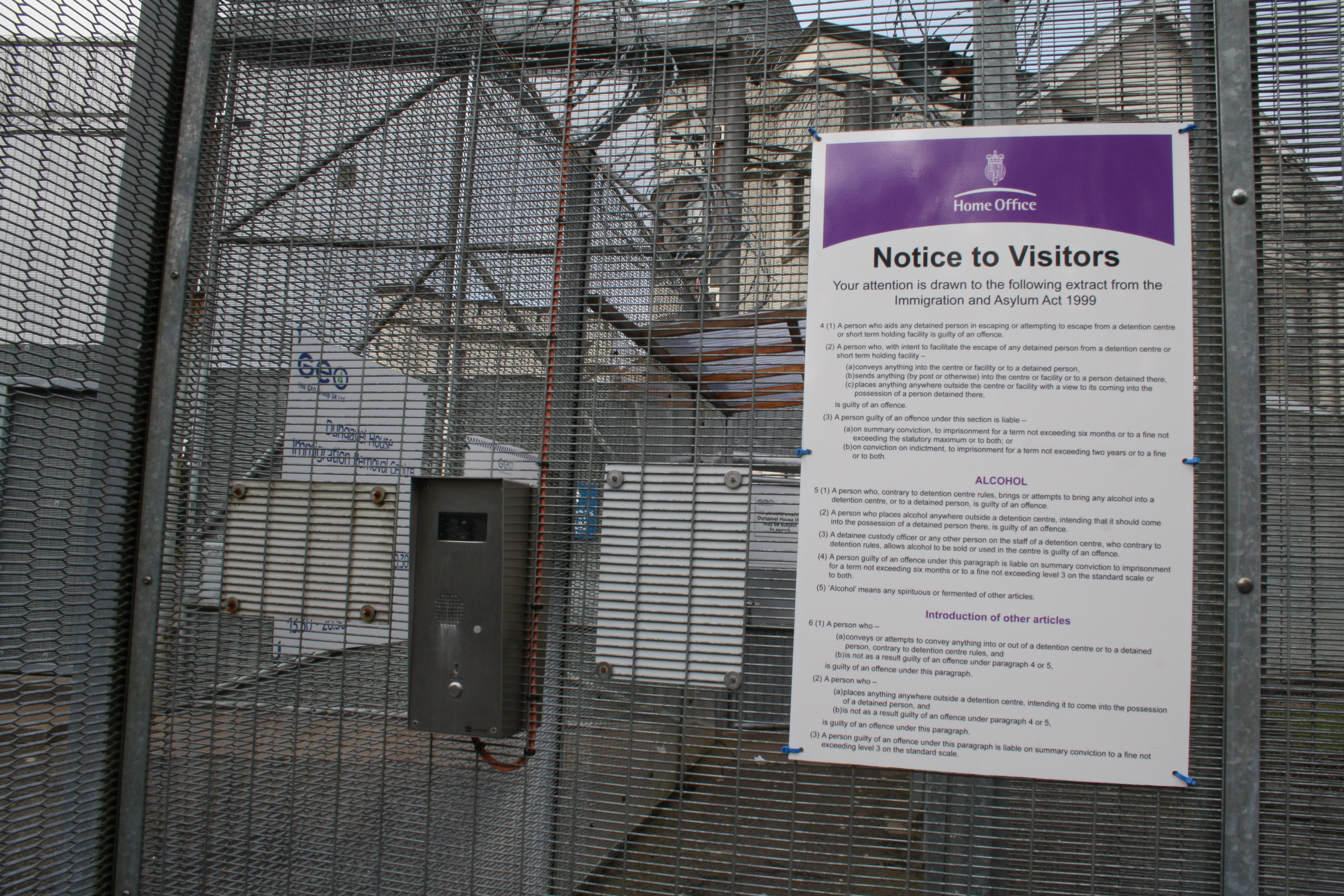
Entrance sign of the Dungavel Detention Centre

The Scottish Government has no direct authority over Dungavel, as asylum and immigration are matters reserved to the UK Parliament. But Scottish officials continued to press for changes at the prison using their authority over child welfare matters. After the 2010 UK General election, the UK Coalition government announced it would end the detention of children under 18 at Dungavel. First reporting suggested that this change would be "taking the problem off Scottish soil", but that the children would only be transferred to Yarl's Wood Immigration Removal Centre in Bedfordshire, privately operated by Serco, with its own history of controversy, detentions of longer than a year, and failures in its treatment of children.

== Public criticism ==
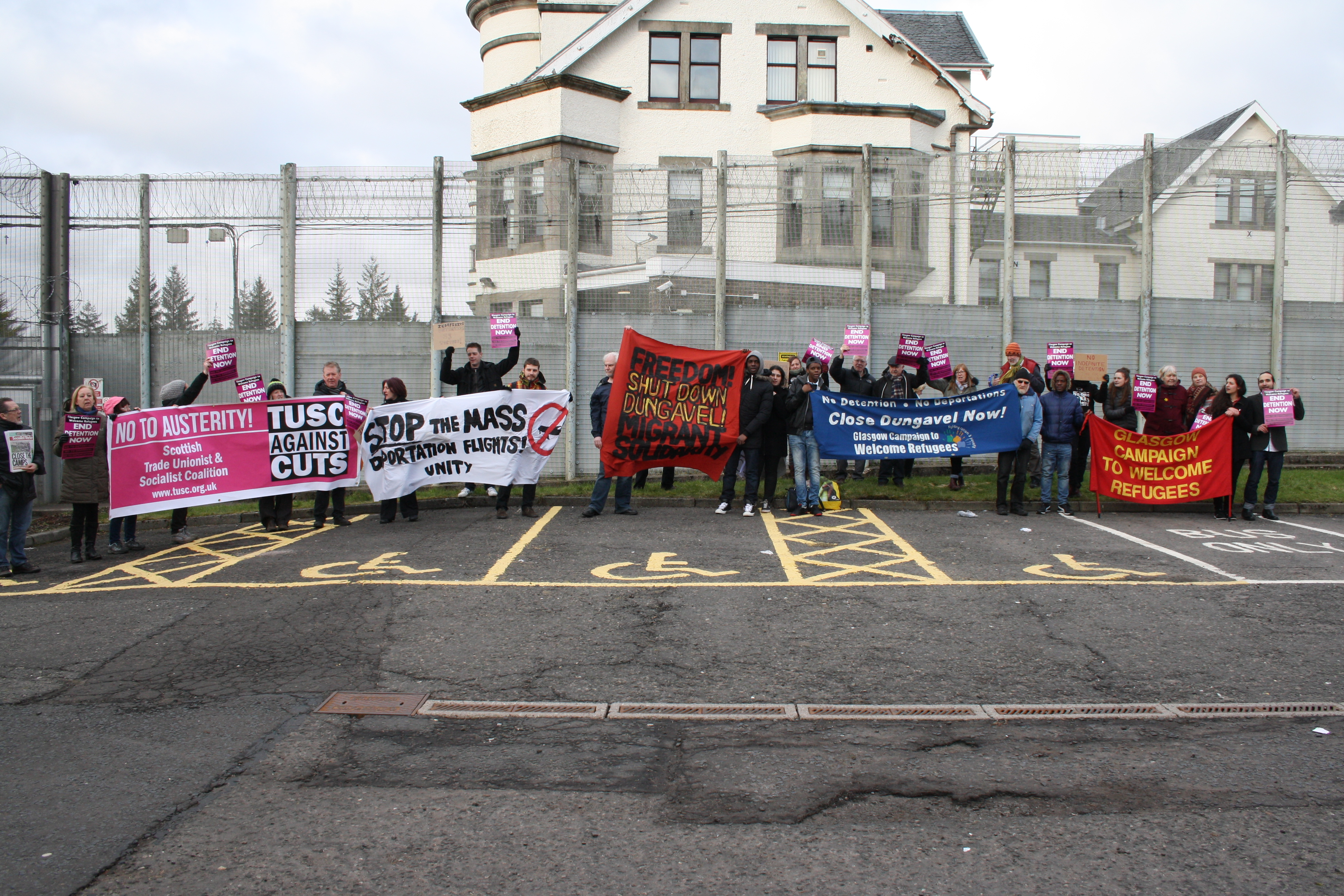
Protests against Dungavel Detention Centre.

Dungavel has faced criticism from organisations like Detention Action and the Scottish Refugee Council, due to breaches of human rights. In 2015, Her Majesty's Inspectorate of Prisons (HMIP) found that vulnerable individuals were being detained in contravention of rules designed to protect vulnerable people from detention.

== See also ==
- Immigration detention in the United Kingdom
- Modern immigration to the United Kingdom
