= Brook House Immigration Removal Centre =

British detention centre

Coordinates: 51°08′46″N 0°11′23″W

Brook House Immigration Removal Centre is a privately managed detention centre in England, operated by Serco on behalf of the Home Office. It is in the grounds of Gatwick Airport, Crawley, West Sussex.

Brook House opened in March 2009 as a newly built facility with a capacity of 448 detainees, which increased to 508 in 2017. The facility is built to a Category B security level. Brook House is built near to the immigration removal centre at Tinsley House, also at Gatwick and currently operated by Serco. The facility was built on a similar design to Colnbrook Immigration Removal Centre at Heathrow and was initially intended to provide short-term accommodation for male detainees.

== History ==
In August 2019 the Home Office invited outsourcing companies to bid for a contract worth up to £260 million over 10 years from May 2020 to run Brook House and Tinsley House. The following month, G4S announced that it would not be bidding for the contract.

In February 2020 the Home Office announced that Serco had been awarded the contract to run both removal centres until 2028. The contractor's bid included an undertaking to increase staffing levels including those responsible for detainees' welfare, to give detainees access to educational activities through the week, and to provide new safeguarding and vulnerability training.

On May 21, 2020, Serco took over operations at the centre from incumbent contractor G4S after a successful tendering process

== Controversies ==
=== Abuse of detainees ===
In 2010 the Chief Inspector of Prisons Dame Anne Owers declared the facility to be "fundamentally unsafe" due to bullying, violence, and drug misuse. Detainees were being held for an average of three months, and at least one man for ten months, in facilities designed for stays of no more than 72 hours.

A report published in March 2017 showed significant improvement, with Chief Inspector of Prisons Peter Clarke stating that staff were to be congratulated. Whilst there was still criticism of the layout and prison-like environment, praise was made for the staff-detainee relationship and for the facilities available. The facility was assessed overall as "reasonably good".

In September 2017, an investigation by BBC Panorama revealed "widespread self-harm and attempted suicides" in the centre, and claimed that drug use among detainees was "rife". Covert footage recorded by detention custody officer Callum Tulley appeared to show other officers mocking, abusing and assaulting detainees. As a result of the programme, G4S suspended one nurse, six detention custody officers and two managers, and placed five other members of staff on restrictive duties, pending investigation. In addition, a former G4S officer, now employed by the Home Office, was also suspended. He was later dismissed from the Home Office, but a criminal investigation by the Crown Prosecution Service found that there was insufficient evidence to charge him in relation to the alleged assault. G4S said the staff suspensions were a "precaution" and advised the BBC that it had reported the allegations to "the relevant authorities".

An internal inquiry carried out by the Home Office's Professional Standards Unit found that the treatment of one of the detainees who, having previously been a victim of torture, was suffering from mental illness and was suicidal, amounted to "inhuman treatment" which "did not involve proportionate use of force and was not in accordance with any approved control and restraint technique". In addition, the report identified that there had been collusion by G4S staff not to record the events. In May 2018 the High Court of Justice gave the detainee, and another individual who had been held at the facility, permission to seek an independent public inquiry into claims of systemic abuse by G4S. In June 2019, after a high court judge ruled that a public inquiry would indeed take place, Tulley told The Guardian newspaper: “In the two and half years I spent inside Brook House … I bore witness to the repeated mistreatment of some of the most vulnerable people in our society. Some detainees were driven to drug use, self-harm and suicide attempts, while others were victims of physical and racial abuse from staff. It’s been hugely frustrating to be told the mistreatment we worked so hard to expose has not yet been adequately investigated, and for those involved, justice has not been done. So it’s encouraging that with a full public inquiry likely to take place, those responsible for the abuse may be held accountable, and detainees in this country may face a safer, stronger system in the future.”

In May 2018, the Independent Monitoring Board's annual report identified a "spike" in violence, both detainee-on-detainee and detainee-on-staff, an attempted escape, and protests against removals during the preceding year, and noted that staff had used force against detainees more than 300 times, twice as much as the previous year. In the same month, the Home Office extended G4S's contract to run Brook House and Tinsley House for a further two years in spite of the ongoing controversy.

In October 2018 the Home Office confirmed that, after being threatened with legal proceedings over the treatment of two detainees, the Prisons and Probation Ombudsman would be carrying out a "dedicated, special investigation" on the understanding that the legal action was called off. In June 2019 Mrs Justice May ruled that the two detainees were entitled to publicly funded lawyers, saying: "When dignity and humanity has been stripped, one purpose of an effective investigation must be to restore what has been taken away through identifying and confronting those responsible, so far as it is possible. How is that to be done in any meaningful way here unless MA and BB, non-lawyers where English is not their first language, are enabled through representation to meet their [alleged] abusers on equal terms?" She further ordered that hearings for the inquiry be held in public and stated that 21 staff from G4S could be compelled to give evidence. An appeal by the Home Office, which argued that staff members should not be compelled to give evidence and that holding the enquiry in public would be prohibitively expensive, was rejected in August 2019, with May reiterating that it was necessary to hold the enquiry in public because "the full extent of the discreditable behaviour has not been exposed to public view" and that open hearings would be necessary "to maintain public confidence in the rule of law".

In September 2019, found that while the average length of detention had "markedly declined" since 2016, incidents of self-harm had significantly increased and that 40% of detainees said they had felt suicidal at some point. It also noted that detainees spent too much time locked in their cells, and that some aspects of security were "unnecessarily stringent".

=== Financial irregularities ===
Logo of the public inquiry

Following on from the Panorama investigation, the BBC reported that it had been shown financial documents, including a slide-show presentation from January 2014, indicating that in 2013 G4S had made a pre-tax profit of more than £2.4M, or just under 20%, on the running of Brook House and a further £1.5M (27.3%) from Tinsley House. A former senior manager with G4S who had been present at finance meetings told the BBC that these profits were "far in excess of what was meant to be made" from the detention centres' contract with the Home Office, and claimed that managers were pressured to pay existing staff overtime rather than creating additional expenditure by recruiting new staff to fill rota gaps.

G4S senior executive Peter Neden, speaking to a cross-party government select committee chaired by Yvette Cooper after the revelations, said the profits reported by the BBC did not take account of costs, but refused to disclose Brook House's finances, citing commercial interests. Neden told the committee he was "ashamed" by the abuse revelations and confirmed that G4S was co-operating with a police inquiry. A former duty director at Brook House gave evidence to the select committee, claiming to have raised concerns to senior management, police, MPs and government ministers about the staff and management culture in institutions run by the company from 2001 until his resignation in 2014, but asserted that no action had been taken and he had found himself "marginalised within the organisation" as a result of his attempt to whistle-blow. He made the further assertion it was "categorically" the case that G4S had boosted its profits by falsely billing the Home Office for non-existent staff and equipment, and that the Home Office had colluded in this. Eight days after this news was reported, it was announced that Ben Saunders, the facility's director, had resigned "with immediate effect".

On 18 October Rebecca Hilsenrath, chief executive of the Equality and Human Rights Commission (EHRC), wrote to Home Secretary Amber Rudd, calling for a prompt and independent inquiry into the abuse allegations. In the letter, Hilsanreth advised Rudd that the alleged abuse potentially breached Article 3 of the European Convention on Human Rights (prohibiting torture and "inhuman or degrading treatment or punishment"): in addition, Hilsenreth suggested that the alleged abuse might highlight a wider problem extending to other immigration removal centres in the UK, raising concerns about the government's decision to outsource the management of such facilities. Hilsenrath said she expected a response to the letter within 14 days and warned the Home Secretary that the EHRC would consider bringing a judicial review if the government failed to act.

A report by the National Audit Office published in July 2019 revealed that between 2012 and 2018 G4S made a gross profit of £14.3M (a rate of between 10% and 20% per year) from running the detention centre: the report also highlighted the fact that under the terms of its contract, the company could not be penalised if staff used excessive force or inappropriate language. Responding to the report, Yvette Cooper stated "For G4S to be making up to 20% gross profits on the Brook House contract at the same time as such awful abuse by staff against detainees was taking place is extremely troubling. Given that profits reduced when G4S had to increase staffing and training after the Panorama programme, this raises very serious questions about G4S's running of the centre to make higher profits whilst not having proper staffing, training and safeguarding systems in place", and confirmed that the select committee intended to further pursue both G4S and the Home Office.

== See also ==
- Immigration detention in the United Kingdom
- Modern immigration to the United Kingdom
