= Immigration detention =

Immigration

Immigration detention is the policy and practice of incarcerating both foreign national asylum seekers/refugees and immigrants — whether suspected of unauthorized arrival, illegal entry, visa violations, as well as those subject to deportation and removal — in detention centers for the purpose of immigration control, until a decision is made by immigration authorities to grant a visa and release them into the community, or to repatriate them to their country of departure. Mandatory detention refers to the practice of compulsorily detaining or imprisoning people who are considered to be illegal immigrants or unauthorized arrivals into a country. Some countries have set a maximum period of detention, while others permit indefinite detention.

== Americas ==
=== Canada ===
In Canada, immigration detainees are held in Immigration Holding Centres (IHCs), known as Le centre de surveillance de l'immigration (CSI) in French, under the auspices of the Canada Border Services Agency (CBSA), who are granted such authority through the Immigration and Refugee Protection Act (IRPA). Immigration detainees may also be kept in provincial jails, either because the IHCs are full, there is no centres in their region, or the detainee's file has a link to criminality.

As of 2020, Canada has three IHCs, each facility with different ownership and operations:

- Laval IHC (Laval, Quebec): Opened in 1999, the Laval IHC operates under a Memorandum of Understanding between CBSA and the Correctional Services of Canada, the latter of whom owns the facility. The facility, known as Le centre de surveillance de l'immigration de Laval in French, is located approximately 30 km (19 mi) from the Montréal-Trudeau International Airport, and includes three buildings and a capacity of holding up to 109 detainees.
- Greater Toronto Area IHC (Toronto, Ontario): Opened in 2003, GTA IHC is provided to the CBSA under a third-party service contract with a vendor. The facility is located around 8 km (5.0 mi) from Pearson International Airport, containing three stories, with an accommodation capacity of up to 183 detainees.
- British Columbia IHC (Surrey, British Columbia): Opened in 2020, BC IHC facility is owned by the CBSA. The facility is located about 30 km (19 mi) from Vancouver International Airport, and able to accommodate up to 70 detainees.

There is no maximum limit to the length of detention, and children may be "housed" in IHCs to prevent the separation of families. Detainees can include: asylum seekers without sufficient amount of necessary identification papers, foreign workers whose visas had expired, and people awaiting deportation. In 2017, Canada received the highest number of asylum claims in its history; between 2017 and 2018, 6609 people were detained in holding centres, compared to 4,248 a year prior.

Between April 2019 and March 2020, CBSA detained 8,825 people, including 138 minors (mostly with a detained parent)—almost 2,000 of these detainees were kept in provincial jails. However, as of November 2020, in the midst of the COVID-19 pandemic, there were only 94 immigration detainees in provincial jails, 12 in Laval IHC, 18 in Greater Toronto IHC, and 11 in British Columbia IHC.

=== United States ===
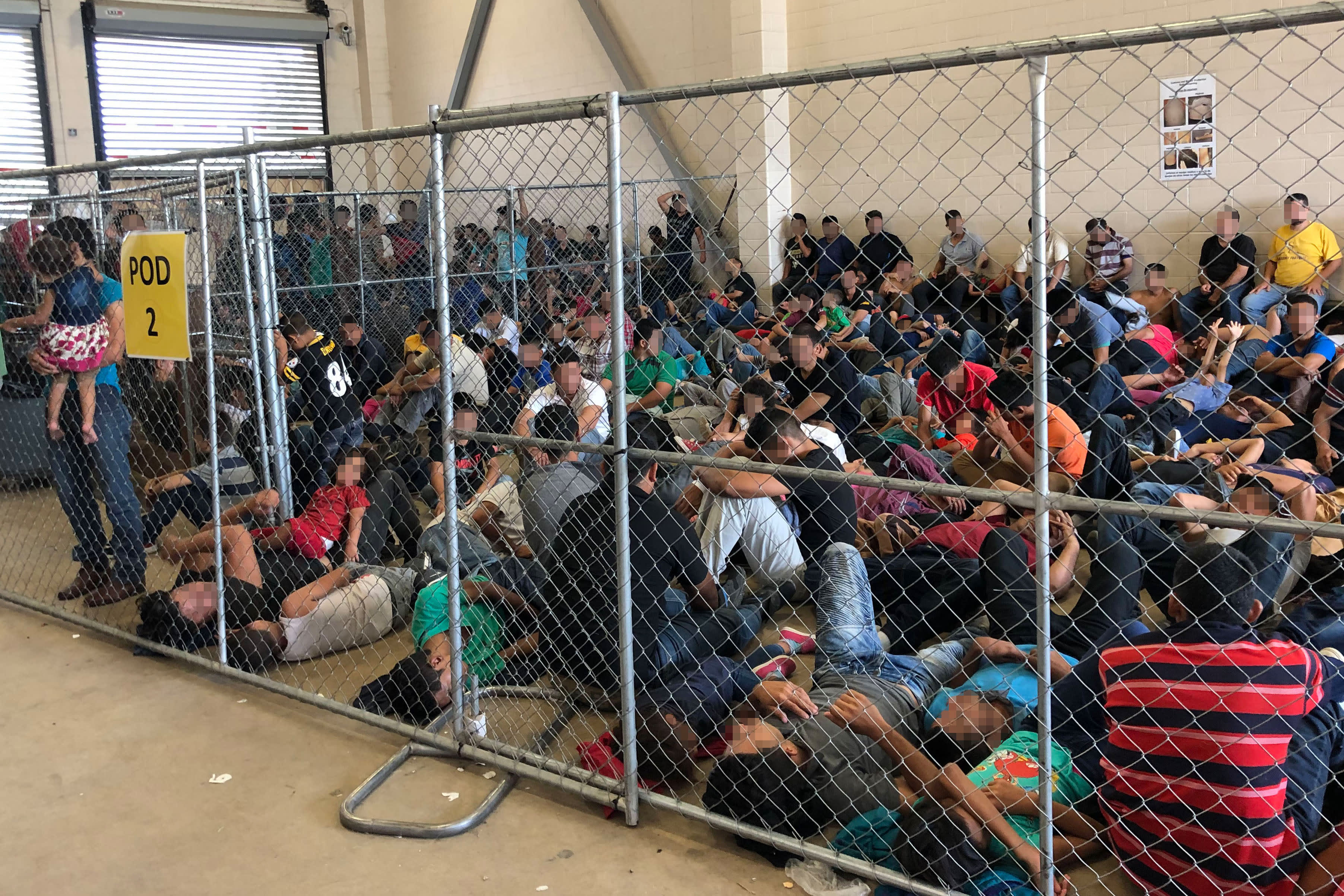
Detained illegal immigrants at the overcrowded United States Border Patrol's McAllen, Texas station, 2019

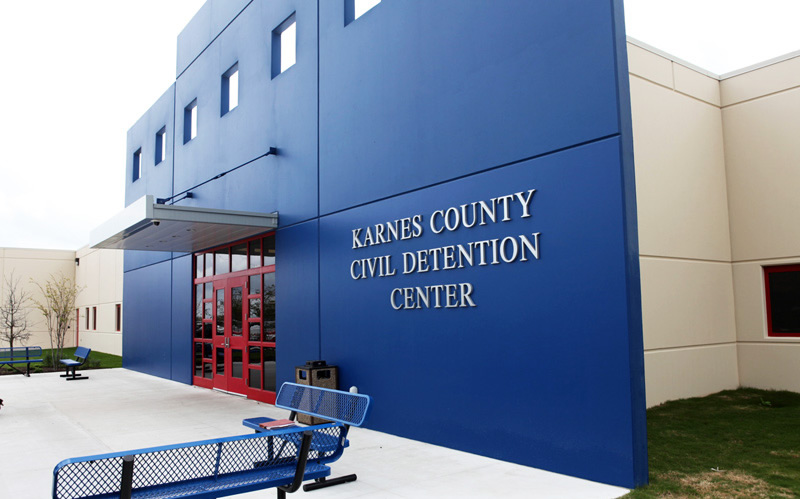
ICE detention facility in Karnes County, Texas

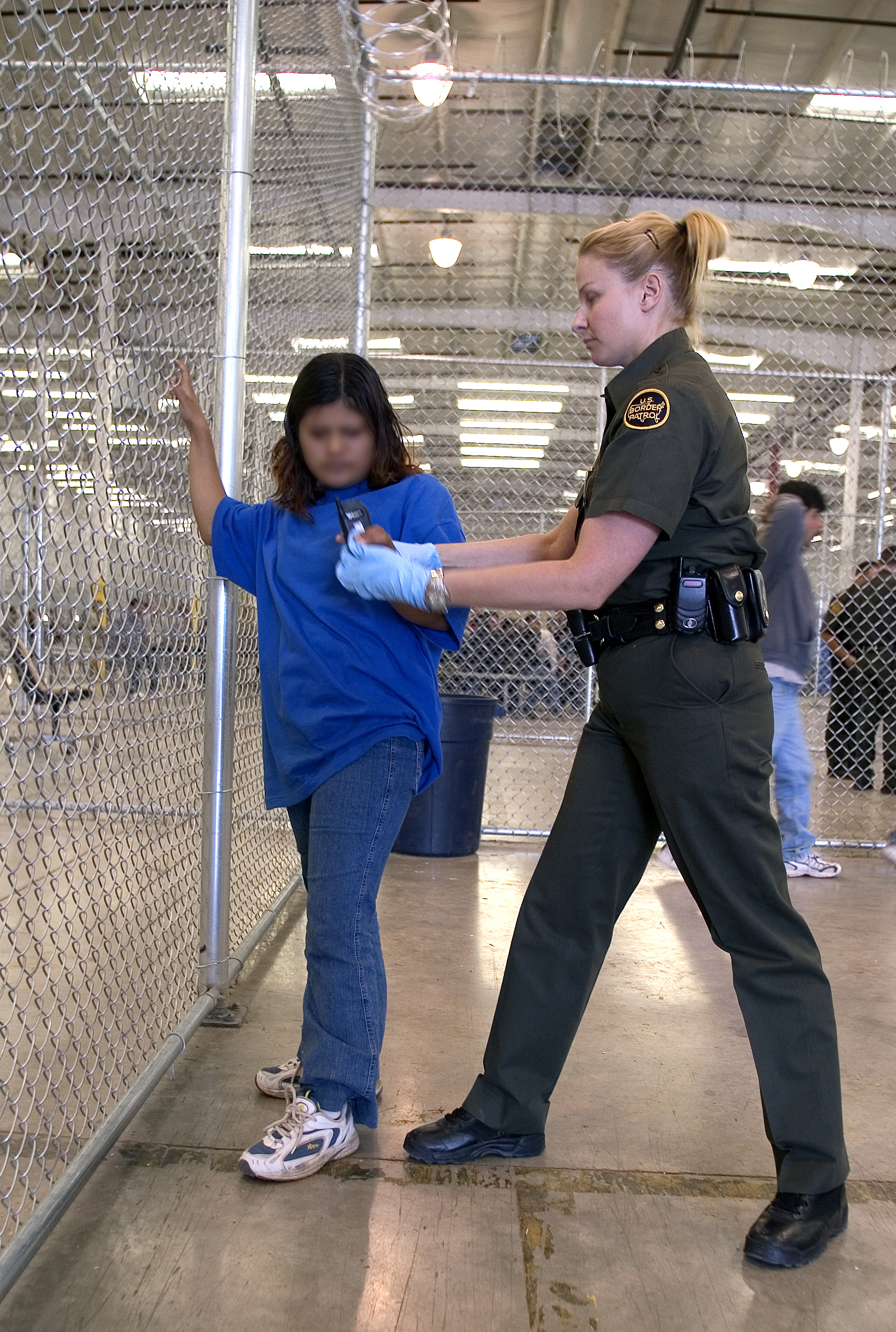
A CBP agent with a female detainee in a holding facility

In the United States, a similar practice began in the early 1980s with Haitians and Cubans detained at Guantanamo Bay, and other groups such as Chinese in jails and detention centres on the mainland. The practice was made mandatory by legislation passed in 1996 in response to the Oklahoma City bombing, and has come under criticism from organizations such as Amnesty International, Human Rights Watch, Human Rights First, all of whom have released major studies of the subject, and the American Civil Liberties Union. As of 2010, about 31,000 non-citizens were held in immigration detention on any given day, including children, in over 200 detention centres, jails, and prisons nationwide.

The T. Don Hutto Residential Center opened in 2006 specifically to house non-criminal families. There are other significant facilities in Elizabeth, New Jersey, Oakdale, Louisiana, Florence, Arizona, Miami, Florida, Seattle, York, Pennsylvania, Batavia, New York, Aguadilla, Puerto Rico, and all along the Texas–Mexico border.

During the five years between 2003 and 2008, about 104 mostly young individuals died in detention of the US Immigration and Customs Enforcement (ICE) or shortly afterwards, and medical neglect may have contributed to 30 of those deaths. For example, on 6 August 2008, 34-year-old New Yorker Hiu Lui Ng died in the detention of ICE. Editors at The New York Times condemned the death and urged that the system must be fixed. ICE has stated that the number of deaths per capita in detention is dramatically lower for ICE detainees than for US prison and jail populations, that they provide "the best possible healthcare" and that the nation as a whole is "experiencing severe shortages of qualified health professionals." In May 2008 Congress began considering a bill to set new standards for immigrant detainee healthcare.

In 2009, the Obama Administration pledged to overhaul the current immigration detention system and transform it into one that is less punitive and subject to greater federal oversight. Immigrants' rights advocates expressed concern over Obama's reform efforts. Immigrants' rights advocates believe the all current immigration policies "have been undermined by the Immigration agency's continued overreliance on penal incarceration practices and by the pervasive anti-reform culture at local ICE field offices."

President Donald Trump and his administration have pursued a deportation policy characterized as "hardline". Reuters reported that thousands of federal court petitions were filed challenging detention, with more than 20,200 Habeas corpus cases since 2025. From October 2025 to February 2026, 400 federal judges had ruled that ICE had illegally detained people a total of 4,421 times.

== Asia-Pacific ==
Many Asian states imprison immigrants on visa violations or for alleged trafficking, including the victims of human trafficking and smuggling. These include Singapore, Malaysia, and Indonesia.

=== Australia ===
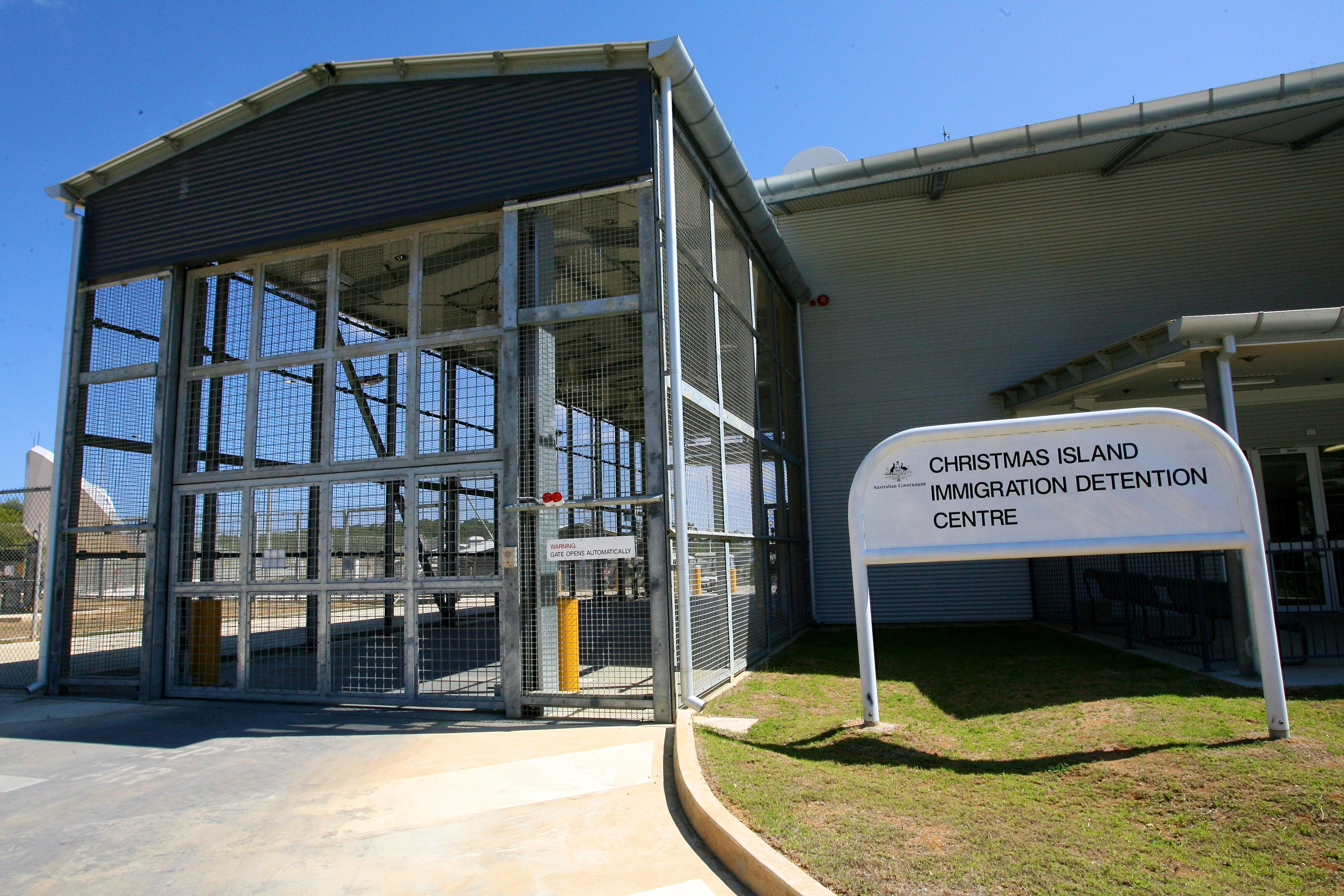
Christmas Island Immigration Detention Centre in Australia

Australian immigration law requires the detention of all non-citizens who are in Australia without a valid visa. Immigration officials are obligated to detain people who arrive in Australia without a visa, or people who arrive with a visa and subsequently become unlawful because their visa has expired or been cancelled. Australian immigration law makes no distinction between the detention of children and adults. In 2004, the High Court of Australia had confirmed, by majority, the constitutionality of indefinite mandatory detention for unlawful non-citizens. This was subsequently overturned in 2023, with the High Court ruling that the Constitution limits detention where there is no prospect of a persons removal in the foreseeable future.

Australia has also sub-contracted with other nations to detain would-be immigrants offshore, including Indonesia, Papua New Guinea, and Nauru. Australia also maintains an offshore detention facility on Christmas Island. In July 2008, the Australian government announced it was ending its policy of automatic detention for asylum seekers who arrive in the country without visas. However, by September 2012, offshore detention was reinstated. Following the 2013 Australian federal election policies have been toughened and Operation Sovereign Borders has been launched.

=== India ===
The first immigration detention centre in Assam state had come up in 2008 when the Indian National Congress (INC) government was in power. In 2011 the Congress government set up three more camps. In 2018 and onwards the Bharatiya Janta Party (BJP) government has plans to build more camps across India.

=== Japan ===
Japanese immigration law permits indefinite detention without a court order including for those that overstay and those who seek asylum. Three immigration detention centers are maintained by immigration bureau for long-term detainees:

- Higashi Nihon Nyukoku Kanri Center (Ushiku, Ibaraki, East Japan) – capacity: 700
- Nishi Nihon Nyukoku Kanri Center (Ibaraki, Osaka, West Japan)
- Omura Nyukoku Kanri Center (Omura, Nagasaki) – capacity: 800

In 2013, 16 regional detention houses were managed for short-term detention. Many of the long-term detainees have been detained in regional short-term detention houses that lack facilities such as common rooms and recreational area. Some detainees spend significant time, up to 13 days, in isolation due to disciplinary measures. Practices of immigration bureau has been criticized for the "lack of transparency", "indefinite detention" and its "arbitrary" nature.

== Europe ==
=== Austria ===
The largest facility in Austria is the Federal care center east in Traiskirchen.

=== Greece ===
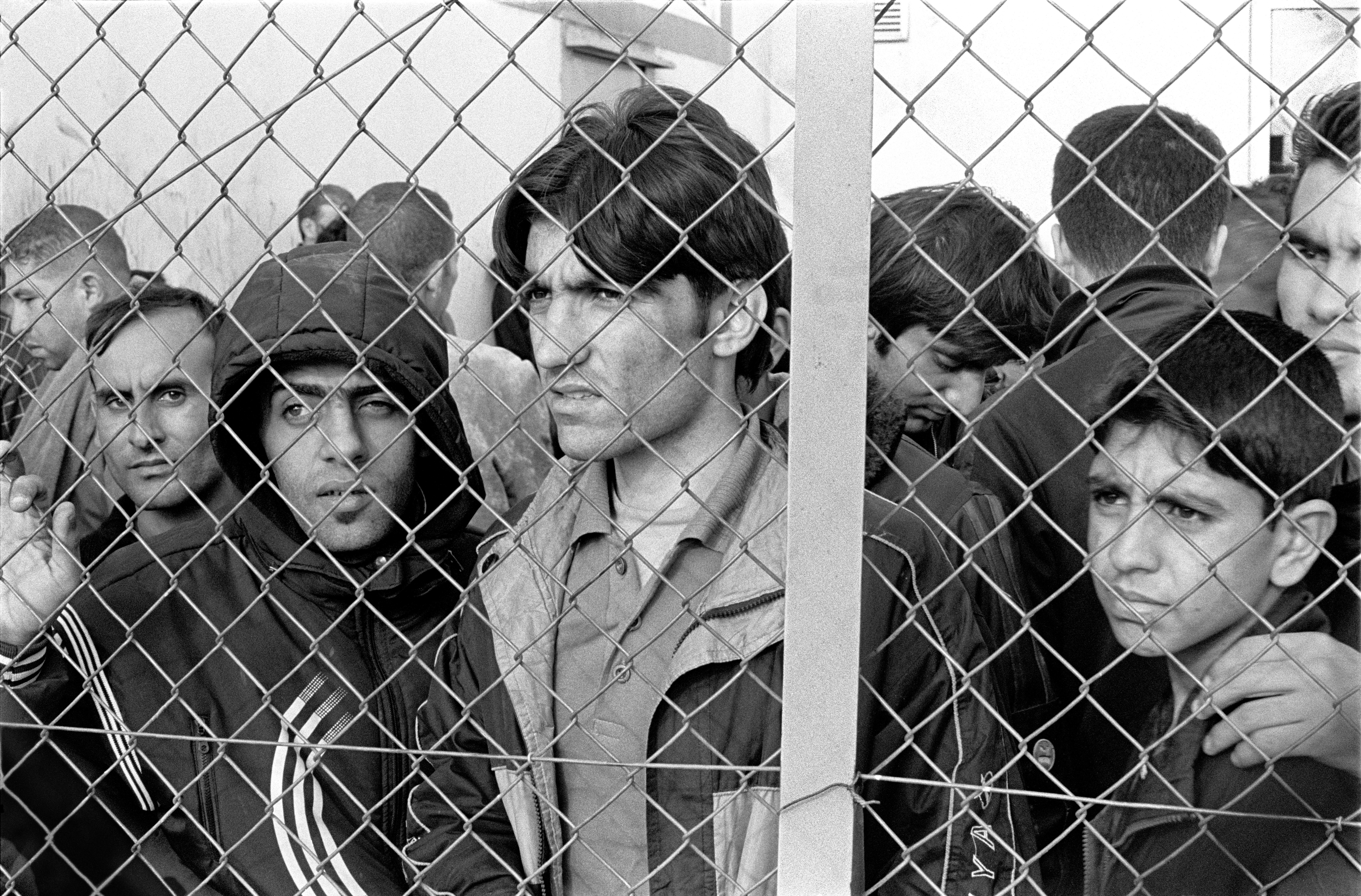
Arrested refugees-immigrants in Fylakio detention center, Evros, Greece

In late 2019, Greece's liberal-conservative government of New Democracy, led by Kyriakos Mitsotakis, announced the creation of five closed, pre-departure detention centers for refugees and immigrants, located on the Aegean islands of Leros, Chios, Lesvos, Kos, and Samos. Hosting over 20,000 immigrants, the islands will be compensated with a 30% VAT reduction. Ten other closed detention camps were planned as of 2019. In October 2026 Greece urged the EU to permit temporary suspensions of asylum applications during sudden mass migration surges.

=== Italy ===
Since 6 March 1998 (law n.40/1998, aka the Turco-Napolitano law), irregular immigrants whose asylum requests have been denied are held in "Provisional Stay Centers" (Italian: Centri di Permanenza Temporanea, CPT) while awaiting expulsion from Italy.

Since 30 July 2002, the Bossi-Fini law (law n. 189/2002) made illegal entry and stay in Italian territory a criminal offence. The centers interned both individuals already sanctioned to expulsion, as before, and other irregular immigrants awaiting proper identification and evaluation of their asylum claims. Accordingly, since 23 May 2008 (law n.125/2008), they were renamed as "Identification and Expulsion Centers" (Italian: Centri di Identificazione ed Espulsione, CIE).

From 13 April 2017, the Minniti-Orlando law (law n. 46/2017) renamed the centers again, as "Permanence Centers for Repatriations" (Italian: Centri di Permanenza per i Rimpatri, CPR). 20 CPRs were planned, but by 2018, only the following were operational:

- Rome, for 125 female inmates.
- Bari, for 90 male inmates.
- Brindisi, for 48 male inmates.
- Turin, for 175 male inmates.
- Potenza, for 100 male inmates.

The facility of Caltanissetta (for 96 male inmates) was provisionally inoperative, pending extensive repairs after an inmates’ revolt. Works were undergoing to open further centers at Gradisca d'Isonzo, Modena, Macomer, Oppido Mamertina and Montichiari.

Besides the CPRs, Italy operates two further types of not-detention centers for migrants:

- "First Aid and Reception Centers" (Italian: Centri di Primo Soccorso e Accoglienza, CPSA); short-stay centers handling initial medical aid, health screening, identification and asylum claims. In 2018, operational CPSAs were located at Lampedusa, Elmas, Otranto and Pozzallo.
- "Reception Centers for Asylum Seekers" (Italian: Centri Accoglienza per i Richiedenti Asilo, CARA), where the vast majority of arriving migrants are housed due to the limited capacity of the CPRs. The centers additionally house migrants previously detained in CPRs that have not been repatriated within the statutory maximum detention period, (Note: Ninety days for the 1998 Turco-Napolitano law, increased to 18 months with the 2002 Bozzi-Fini law, then reduced to 12 months in 2015.) and have therefore been released from custody. In 2018, operational CARAs were located at Gradisca d'Isonzo, Arcevia, Castelnuovo di Porto, Manfredonia, Bari, Brindisi, Crotone, Mineo, Pozzallo, Caltanissetta, Lampedusa, Trapani and Elmas. Several NGOs and government organizations have described conditions inside the centres as "inhuman". Amnesty International has denounced the prolonged detention of immigrants in containers and other inadequate housing, where they are exposed to extreme temperatures and subjected to overcrowded conditions.

=== Malta ===
In 2002 and the following years, Malta began to receive a large influx of migrants. The government then begun to apply the 1970 Chapter 217 of the Laws of Malta (Immigration Act), providing for detention for all "prohibited migrants", including prospective asylum seekers, soon after apprehension by the immigration authorities. In 2003, the Maltese government substituted the indefinite detention policy with an 18-month detention length (the maximum under EU law) after which the applicant is transferred to an open centre if the processing of his/her application has not been finished.

The Maltese detention policy, the strictest in Europe, gathered heavy criticism by the UNHCR for the extensive duration of detention, and in 2004 it was also criticized by the commissioner for human rights of Council of Europe, Álvaro Gil-Robles, as international standards required cautious and individual examination of each case and proper legal checks before incarceration, which were missing in the Maltese legislation. The Council of Europe also criticised four of the administrative detention centres as in "deplorable conditions" and failing to live up to legally binding international standards

The Ministry for Justice and Home Affairs pursued the migrants detention policy nevertheless, justifying it in 2005 by "national interest, and more specifically, for reasons concerning employment, accommodation and maintenance of public order." In 2008, an EP-OIM comparative study found that "following a long stay in detention [illegal immigrants] are then released into the community...joining the black market economy and suffering abuse with regard to conditions of work.

The detention policy was criticised, in the following years, by NGOs and international bodies, including Human Rights Watch, the Jesuits and UNHCR. In 2012, the Council of Europe reiterated that such a policy is contrary to the prohibition of arbitrary detention in the European Convention on Human Rights (ECHR).

=== Netherlands ===
In the Netherlands, foreigners who fail to obtain a residence status can be detained prior to deportation. Detention centers are located in Zaandam, Zeist, and Alphen aan den Rijn. Additionally, there are deportation centers at Schiphol and Rotterdam airports.

Immigration detention in the Netherlands has been criticised for the conditions immigrants are held in – which are often worse than those for criminal detainees – due to a lack of probationary leave, rehabilitation assistance, legal assistance, laws restricting the maximum detention time and a maximum time for judicial review from a judge.

=== Portugal ===
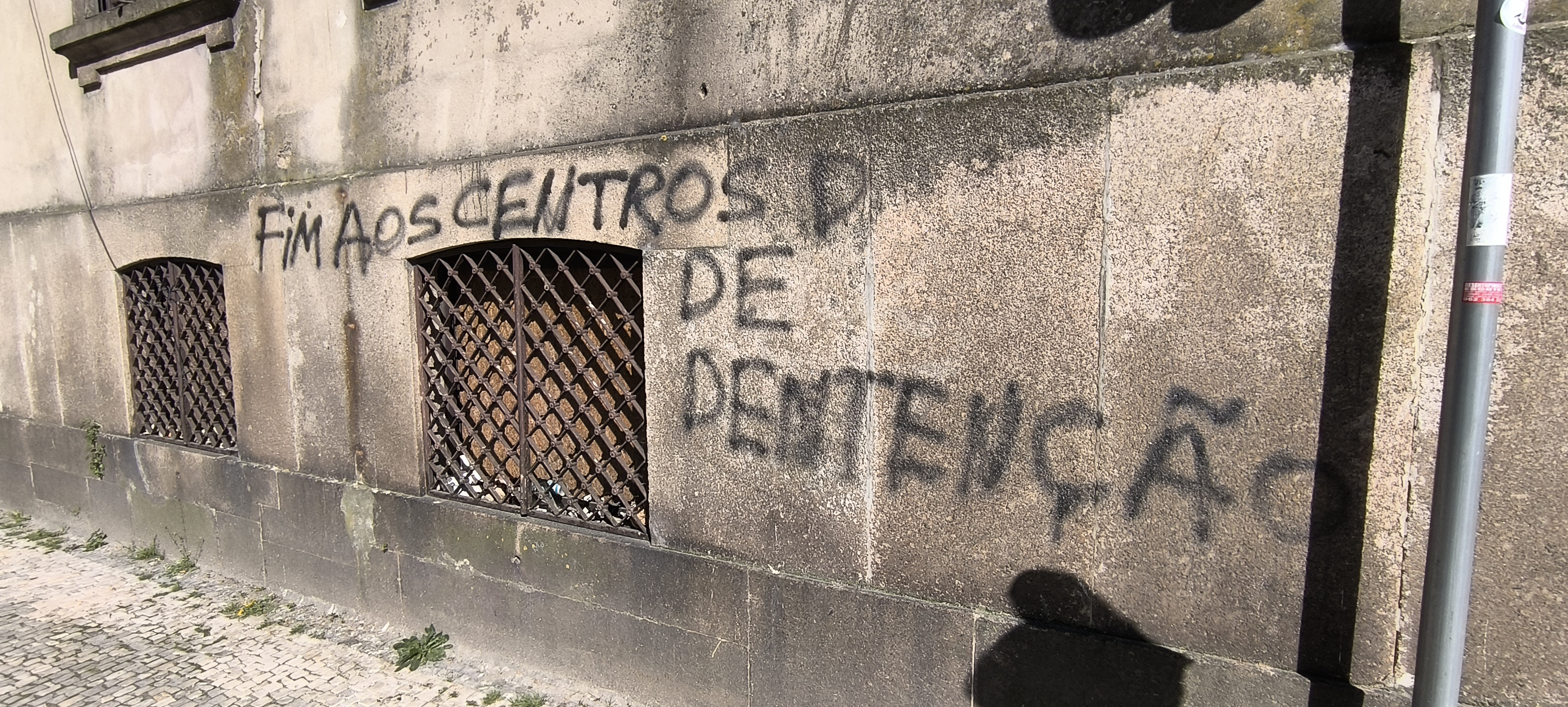
Portuguese-language graffiti against detention centers in Porto.

In Portugal, the Ministry of Interior is responsible for immigration matters. As of 2009, the sole officially designated immigration detention centre is Unidade Habitacional de Santo António, located in Porto. Opened in 2006, the centre is managed by the Foreigners and Borders Service (Serviço de Estrangeiros e Fronteiras, SEF).

There are also five Temporary Installation Centres (Centros de Instalação Temporária, CIT) located at major airports including Porto, Lisbon, Faro, Funchal, and Ponta Delgada.

In addition to these government-run facilities, there are two non-secure centers located near Lisbon: the Bobadela reception centre for asylum seekers, operated by the Portuguese Council for Asylum Seekers (Conselho Português para os Refugiados, CPR), and the Pedro Arupe reception centre, managed by the Jesuit Refugee Service.

=== Spain ===
There are nine detention centers in Spain, known as CIEs (Centro de Internamiento de Extranjeros), run by the Ministry of the Interior, which can be found in the cities of Madrid, Barcelona, Valencia, Algeciras, Tarifa, Malaga, and in the islands of Gran Canaria, Fuerteventura, and Tenerife.

Expulsion paperwork can be initiated when a foreign person is in one of the following situations:

1. Lacking documentation in Spanish territory.
2. Working without a work permit, even if they have a valid resident permit.
3. Be involved in activities that violate public order or interior or exterior state security or any activity contrary to Spanish interests or that could put in danger Spain's relations with other countries.
4. Be convicted inside or outside of Spain of a crime punishable by incarceration for greater than one year.
5. Hiding or falsifying their situation from the Ministry of the Interior.
6. Lacking a legal livelihood or taking part in illegal activity.

Various civil organizations (e.g. APDHA, SOS Racismo, and Andalucía Acoge) have appealed to the Supreme Court of Spain, declaring the regulations behind the CIEs null and void for violating several human rights.

=== Ukraine ===
In Ukraine "Temporary Detention Centres", including one in Pavshyno, are run by the State Border Guard Service of Ukraine, responsible to the president.

=== United Kingdom ===
The British Home Office has a number of detention centres, including (as of January 2015): 11 designated Immigration Removal Centres (IRCs), 4 designated Residential and Short Term Holding Facilities, and 1 Non-Residential Short Term Holding Facility. Four of the IRCs are managed by the Prison Service and the others are outsourced to private companies including Mitie, GEO Group, G4S Group, and Serco. Individuals can be detained under Immigration Act powers for a number of reasons. The largest category of detainees is people who have claimed asylum. Other people include those detained awaiting determination of their right to entry to the UK, people who have been refused permission to enter and are awaiting removal, people who have overstayed the expiry of their visas or have not complied with their visa terms, and people lacking the required documentation to live in the UK.

The Nationality, Immigration and Asylum Act 2002 formally changed the name of "detention centres" to "removal centres".

Both operation centres ran by G4S Group (as of 2018. Since 2020 both centres have been run by Serco) are located near Gatwick Airport:

- Brook House Immigration Removal Centre
- Tinsley House Immigration Removal Centre

Operation centres ran by Mitie (as of 2018) include:

- Campsfield House (Oxfordshire)
- Colnbrook Immigration Removal Centre (near Heathrow Airport)
- Harmondsworth Immigration Removal Centre (near Heathrow Airport)

Other operation centres (as of 2018) include:

- Larne House (Larne, County Antrim), run by Tascor, a subsidiary of Capita
- Pennine House, at Manchester Airport which is run by Tascor
- Dungavel (Lanarkshire), run by GEO Group
- Morton Hall Immigration Removal Centre (near Newark), run by Her Majesty's Prison Service
- Yarl's Wood Immigration Removal Centre (Bedfordshire), run by Serco

Additionally, some prisons detain migrants or asylum seekers purely under Immigration Act powers, usually if they have been serving a prison sentence which has expired. There are also four short term holding facilities in Manchester, Dover, Harwich and Colnbrook.

The British government has been given powers to detain asylum seekers and migrants at any stage of the asylum process. The use of asylum has increased with the introduction of the process of 'fast track', or the procedure by which the Immigration Service assess asylum claims which are capable of being decided quickly. Fast-tracking takes place in Oakington Reception Centre, Harmondsworth, and Yarl's Wood.

There are three situations in which it is lawful to detain an asylum seeker or migrant.

1. To fast track their claim
2. If the government has reasonable grounds to believe that the asylum seeker or migrant will abscond or not abide by the conditions of entry.
3. If the asylum seeker or migrant is about to be deported.

Once detained, it is possible to apply for bail. There is legal aid for representation at bail hearings and the organisation Bail for Immigration Detainees provides help and assistance for those subject to detention to represent themselves.

Since summer 2005, there has been an increase in the detention of foreign nationals since Home Secretary Charles Clarke's foreign prisoners scandal, which revealed that there were a number of foreign nationals who had committed crimes and had not been deported at the end of their sentence.

Criticism of UK immigration detention focuses on comparisons with prison conditions in which persons are kept though they have never been convicted of a crime, the lack of judicial oversight, and on the lengthy bureaucratic delays that often prevent a person from being released, particularly when there is no evidence that the detainee will present a harm or a burden to society if allowed to remain at large while their situation is examined. In 2006, the conditions of detention centres were criticised, by the UK Inspector of Prisons.

== See also ==
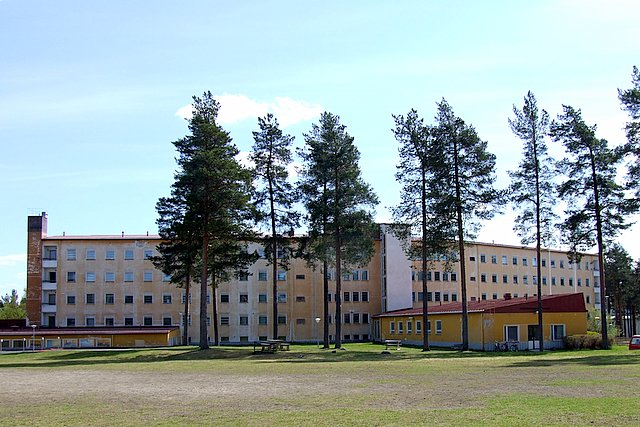
Heikinharju's immigration detention facility in Oulu, Finland

- Immigration detention in the United States
- Immigration detention in the United Kingdom
- Concentration camps
- Decarceration in the United States
- Dawn raid
- Golden Venture
- Mandatory sentencing
- Mariel boatlift
- Pacific Solution
- Mental health consequences of immigration detention
