= Pennine House Immigration Removal Centre =

Coordinates: 51.1457°N 0.1773°W

Pennine House was a United Kingdom Immigration Removal Centre (IRC), where individuals were held while awaiting decisions on their asylum claim or being considered for deportation. It was closed in 2017 and was replaced the following year by Manchester Short Term Holding Facility.

== Description ==
Pennine House was located in Terminal 2 of Manchester Airport. It opened on 30 November 2008.

There were bed spaces for 32 people. The centre had a lounge area, dining room, with permanent access to fresh fruits, drinks and snacks, fresh air and smoking areas, access to on call chaplaincy team based at the airport, and a shop.

In 2013, a detainee died from a suspected heart attack.

== See also ==
- Manchester Short Term Holding Facility
- Immigration detention in the United Kingdom
