= Muazu =

Muazu may refer to:

== People ==
=== First name ===
- Muazu Abubakar, Nigerian professor of toxicology
- Mu'azu Babangida Aliyu (2007-2015), Nigerian governor
- Muazu Magaji, Nigerian politician and activist

=== Surname ===
- Gwarzo Abdullahi Muazu (born 1978), Nigerian politician
- Isa Muazu, Nigerian man who caused a hunger strike
- Usman Mu'azu (1942-2008), military governor
- Yakubu Mu'azu, Nigerian politician
