= Illegal entry =

Act of entering a country in violation of its laws

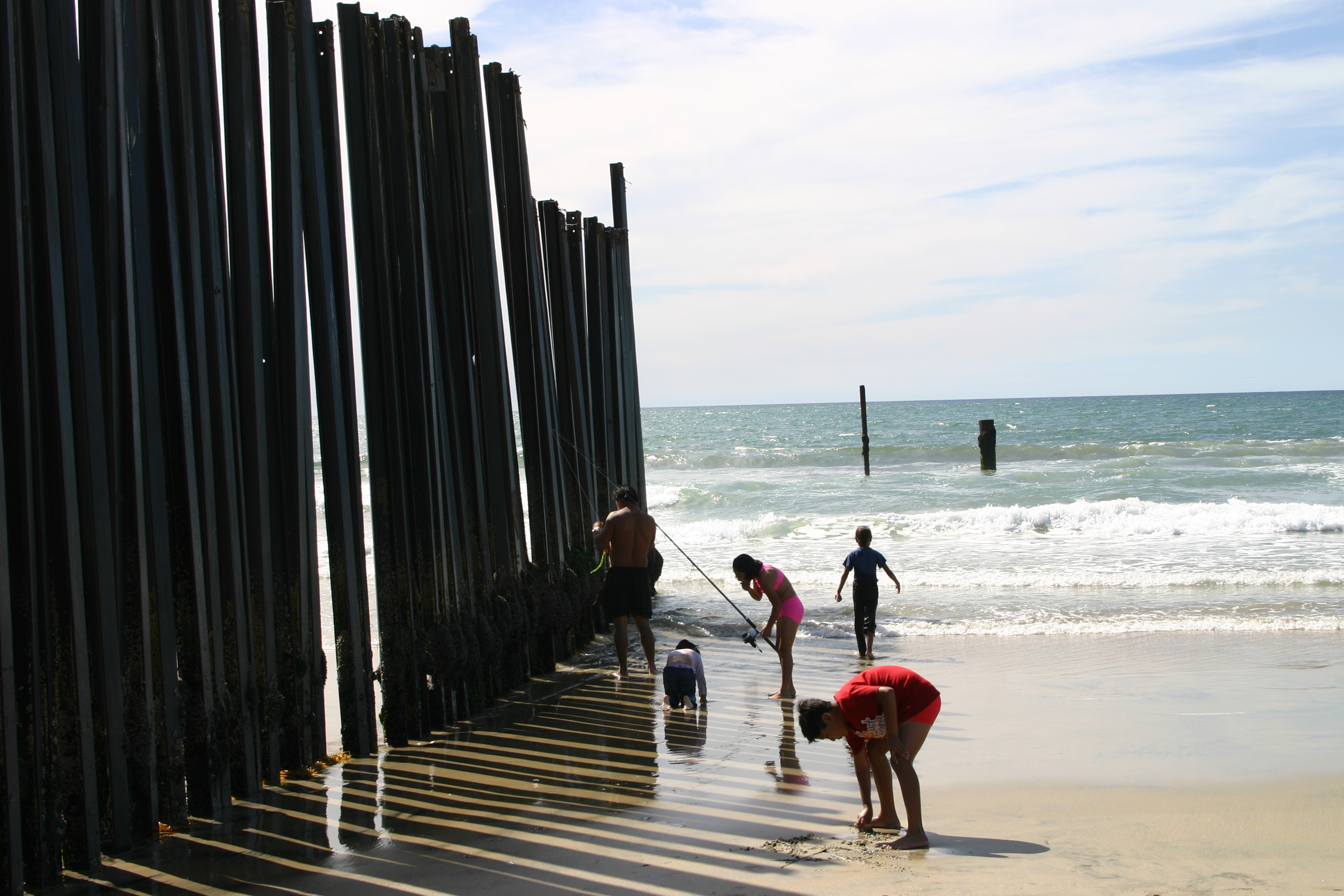
Family enjoys the beach on the US side of the barrier at the Pacific Ocean in Imperial Beach, San Diego, California.

Illegal entry is the act of foreign nationals arriving in or crossing the borders into a country in violation of its immigration law. Human smuggling is the practice of aiding people in crossing international borders for financial gain, often in large groups. Human smuggling is associated with human trafficking. Trafficking involves physical force, fraud, or deception to obtain and transport people, usually for enslavement or forced prostitution.

== By country ==
=== India ===
Presently, India is constructing a fence along the border to restrict illegal traffic from Bangladesh. The Indo-Bangladeshi barrier is 4,000 kilometers (2,500 mi) long. The stated aim of the fence is to stop infiltration of terrorists, prevent smuggling, and to bring a close to illegal immigration from Bangladesh.

=== Australia ===
In Australia, mandatory immigration detention was revived in 1992 for all foreigners who arrive in Australia without a visa. That only "border applicants" are subject to detention has sparked criticism, as it is claimed to unfairly discriminate against certain migrants.

Suspected Irregular Entry Vessel was the name used by the Australian Defence Force or Australian Coastwatch for maritime vessels which were suspected to be attempting to reach Australia without authorisation. In practice, these boats were often carrying asylum seekers who had departed from Indonesia on the final leg of a journey which started in countries such as Iraq and Afghanistan after paying people smugglers.

=== Palestine ===
During 1933–1948, the British government limited Jewish immigration to Palestine with quotas, and following the rise of Nazism to power in Germany, illegal immigration to Palestine commenced. The illegal immigration was known as Aliyah Bet ("secondary immigration"), or Ha'apalah, and was organized by the Mossad Le'aliyah Bet, as well as by the Irgun. Immigration was done mainly by sea, and to a lesser extent overland through Iraq and Syria. Beginning in 1939 Jewish immigration was further restricted, limiting it to 75,000 individuals for a period of five years after which immigration was to end completely. During World War II and the years that followed until independence, Aliyah Bet became the main form of Jewish immigration to Palestine. Despite British efforts to curb the illegal immigration, during the 14 years of its operation, 110,000 Jews immigrated to Palestine.

=== Turkey ===
Turkey, which is a transit point for unauthorized migrants trying to reach Europe, has been accused of being unable to secure its borders with Greece. Since 1996, 40 unauthorized migrants have been killed by mines, after entering Greek territory in Evros. In 2001, about 800 illegal immigrants were rescued by the Greek coastguards after a fire broke out on board the Turkish-flagged Brelner, believed to have set sail from the Turkish port of İzmir, probably en route to Italy. Once in July 2004 and a second time in May 2006, Hellenic Coast Guard ships were caught on film cruising as near as a few hundred meters off the Turkish coast and abandoning clandestines to the sea. This practice resulted in the drowning of six people between Chios and Karaburun on 26 September 2006 while three others disappeared and 31 were saved by Turkish gendarmes and fishermen. Three of the drowned were Tunisians, one was Algerian, one Palestinian and the other Iraqi. The three disappeared were also Tunisians.

As a result of bilateral negotiations, a readmission agreement was signed between Turkey and Greece in November 2001 and went into effect in April 2002. For third country nationals, this protocol gives the parties 14 days to inform each other of the number of persons to be returned after the date of illegal entry. For nationals of the two countries the authorities can make use of simplified procedures. But the strict application of the agreement is reported to have retrograded as of 2003.

=== China ===
People's Republic of China is building a security barrier along its border with North Korea to prevent defectors or refugees from North Korea from entering the country illegally.

On May 13, 2004, the People's Republic of China sentenced Yang Jianli, a Chinese dissident with U.S. residency, to five years in prison for espionage and illegal entry.

==== Hong Kong ====
The illegal entry of Vietnamese refugees was a concern for the Hong Kong government for 25 years. The issue was first resolved in 2000. Between 1975 and 1999, 143,700 Vietnamese refugees were resettled in other countries and more than 67,000 Vietnamese migrants were repatriated.

=== Iran ===
On 23 March 2007, 15 British Royal Navy personnel, from HMS Cornwall, were surrounded by the Navy of the Iranian Revolutionary Guards and were subsequently detained off the Iraq-Iran coast. Iran's director general for Western European affairs, Ibrahim Rahimpour, said that the British boats had made "illegal entry" into Iranian territorial waters and that the personnel "were arrested by border guards for investigation and questioning". On 24 March, the Iranian Fars News Agency said the navigational equipment seized on the British boats shows the sailors were aware that they were operating in Iranian waters. On the same day, General Ali Reza Afshar, a top military official, said the sailors had confessed to illegal entry into Iran's waters.

=== Egypt ===
On January 25, 2008, Egyptian security forces blocked almost all illegal entry points along the border with Gaza to try to stem the flow of Palestinians wanting to leave. Egyptian forces in riot gear erected barbed wire and chain-link fences along the border to prevent more Palestinians from crossing.

=== Thailand ===
On June 5, 2006, 231 Hmong refugees fleeing Laos were detained by police in Amphoe Khao Kho, Phetchabun Province for illegal entry into Thailand. The Hmong were seeking asylum at the province's Ban Huay Nam Khao, where about 6,500 ethnic Hmong are being sheltered, but the Thai military refused to allow them to stay. Most of the Hmong claim they fought against the communists in the Secret War.

=== Malaysia ===
Most unlawful migrants to Malaysia are from nearby Southeast Asian countries such as Indonesia particularly on Indonesia–Malaysia border via maritime boundary of Strait of Malacca and land border on the island of Borneo. The land border on Malaysia–Thailand mostly used by Bangladeshi & Rakhine people of Myanmar. The Malaysia–Philippines border normally used by Mindanao people via Celebes Sea.

=== Ukraine ===
Illegal entry is a crime in the Ukraine, and the prescribed punishment, including administrative penalties, is of up to three years' prison, as per Criminal Code 2001, art. 332-2.

=== United States ===
Apprehensions between ports of entry, annually by calendar year

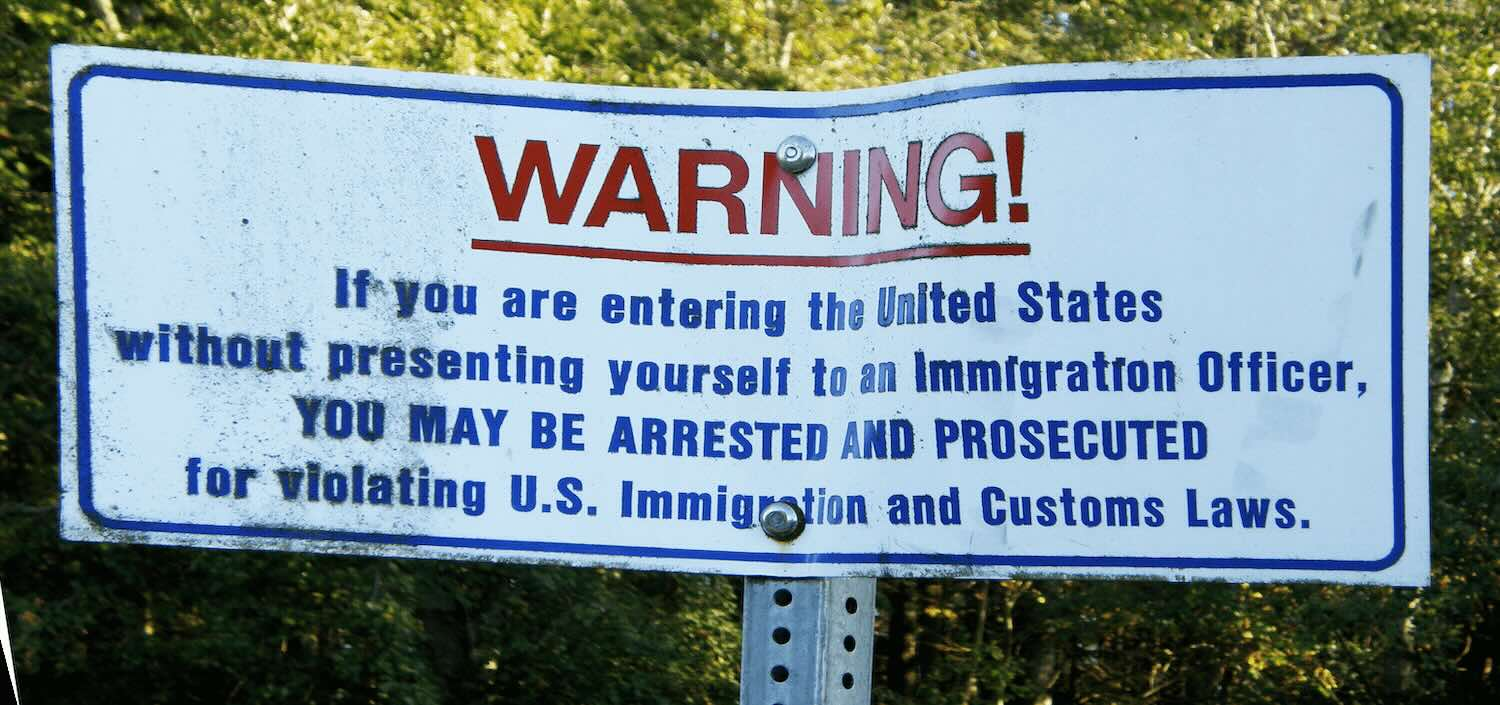
A warning sign at the international boundary between the United States and Canada in Point Roberts, Washington

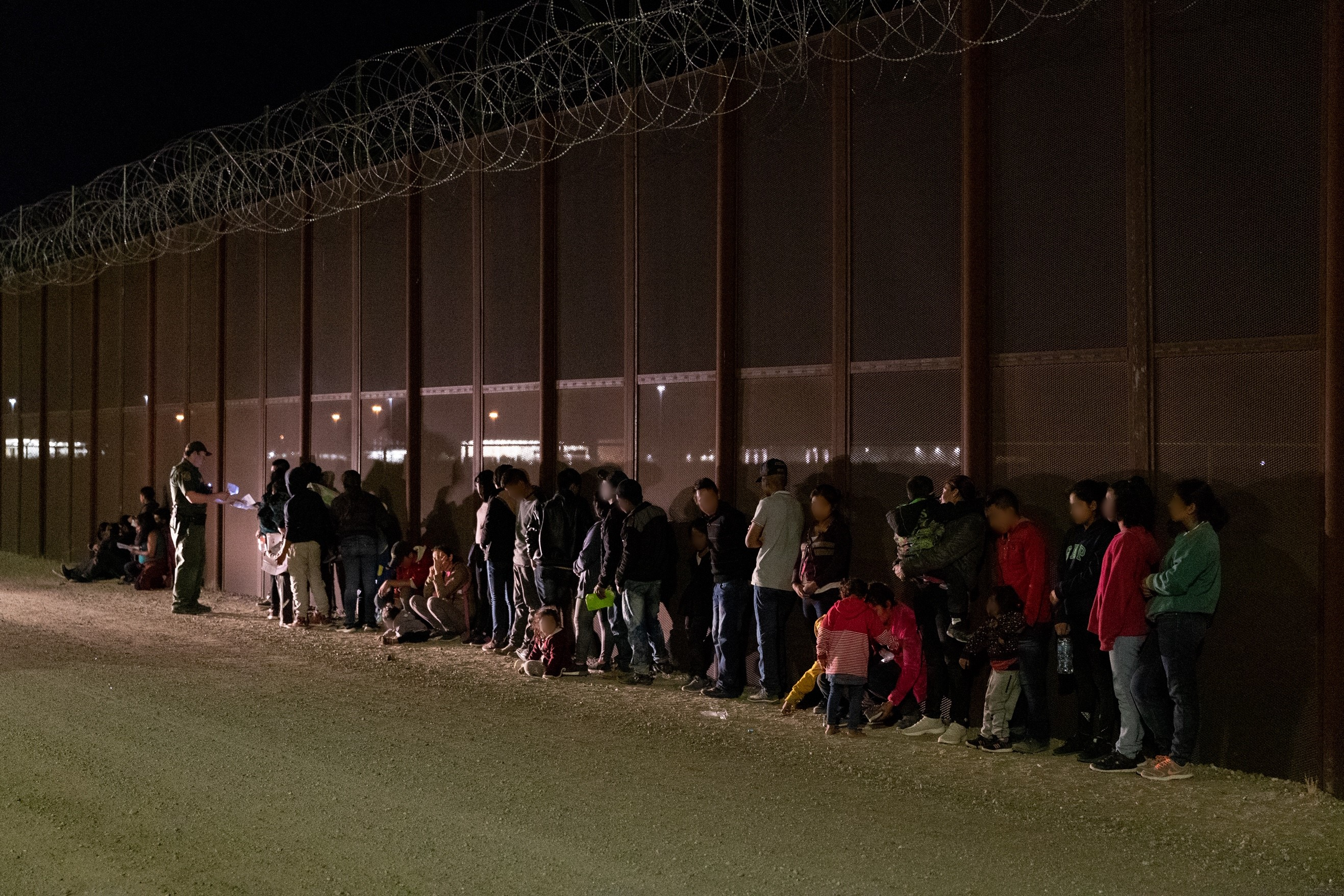
U.S. Border Patrol agents review documents of individuals suspected of attempted illegal entry in 2019.

An estimated half a million illegal entries into the United States occur each year, according to research conducted by the Government Accountability Office (GAO) in 2006. In 2008, the Pew Hispanic Center estimated that 6 million to 7 million people have been living in the United States after having evaded the Immigration Inspectors or Border Patrol.

The offense is a misdemeanor according to the Immigration and Nationality Act of 1965, which prohibits non-nationals from entering or attempting to enter the United States at any time or place which has not been designated by an immigration officer, and also prohibits non-nationals from eluding inspection by immigration officers.

The U.S. Customs and Border Protection is responsible for apprehending individuals attempting to enter the United States illegally. The U.S. Border Patrol is its mobile uniformed law enforcement arm, responsible for deterrence, detection, and apprehension of those who enter the United States without authorization from the government or outside the designated ports of entry.

The unfenced, rural, mountainous and desert border between Arizona and Mexico has become a major entrance area for unlawful migration to the United States, due in part to the increased difficulty of crossing illegally into California. Each year, several hundred migrants die along the Mexico–U.S. border.

Often, migrants employ people smugglers (called "coyotes") who promise a safe passage into the United States and are paid up to $3,000–6,000 for passages that include long walking distances or $7,000–14,000 for an easier travel per person they assist in crossing the border. The difficulty and expense of the journey has prompted many migrant workers to stay in the United States longer or indefinitely.

According to the U.S. Border Patrol, 1,954 migrants died along the Mexico–U.S. border between 1998 and 2004. On June 6, 1993, 283 Chinese migrants attempted illegal entry into the United States via a sea vessel; ten of them arrived dead. Reference: Bill Ward

In the U.S. government fiscal year 2021–22, Border Patrol agents made 1.82 million arrests, exceeding the number (1.66 million) made the previous fiscal years. It was expected that the arrest level would reach the 2 million mark by year’s end. One poll found that the majority of American citizens surveyed say the United States is experiencing an invasion at its southern border.

=== United Kingdom ===
A recent study into irregular immigration to the United Kingdom states that "most irregular migrants have committed administrative offences rather than a serious crime". In 2004, illegal entry action was initiated against 36,550 migrants; it was estimated that more migrants overstay their visa than enter clandestinely, hence considered unlikely that there are large numbers of people crossing UK borders without permission.

Many of the routes for clandestine entry are very dangerous. There were 72 documented deaths that are thought to have occurred while entering UK between 1993 and 2002. The most common cause of death while entering the UK (61 of the deaths recorded) was suffocation in a lorry while being smuggled into the UK by ferry; Others drowned in the English Channel, froze to death as stowaways on an aeroplane and were crushed by trains in the Channel Tunnel.

=== Germany ===
Over 28,000 people entered Germany by land and 10,300 entering from Austria. Some 9,270 people also arrived irregularly at airports and more than 1,120 people at sea ports. Most of the migrants were from Afghanistan, Nigeria, Iraq, Syria and Turkey. This brought the number to 38,000 irregular migrants arrested by the Federal Police in Germany.

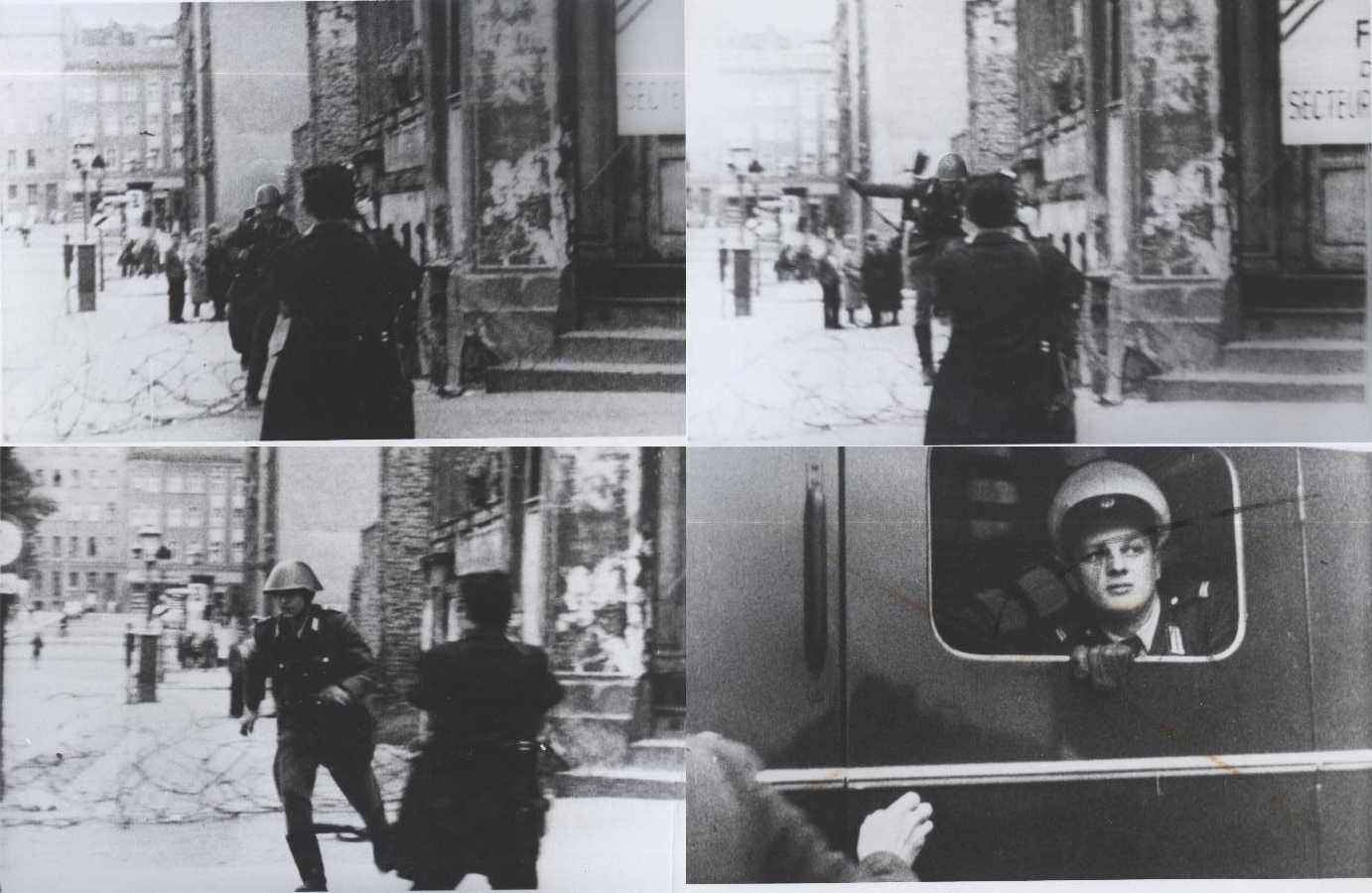
East German guard/soldier defecting to West Germany

== See also ==
- Airspace
- Asylum shopping
- Border control
- Illegal immigration
- Immigration law
- Maritime boundary
- Unauthorised arrival
- Immigration detention
- Freedom of movement
