= Independent monitoring board =

Independent Monitoring Boards

Independent monitoring boards (IMB) are statutory bodies established by the Prison Act 1952 to monitor the welfare of prisoners in the UK to ensure that they are properly cared for within Prison and Immigration Centre rules, whilst in custody and detention. Their responsibilities were extended to Immigration Removal Centres by the Immigration and Asylum Act 1999 following an inspection in 1989 of what was then Harmondsworth Detention Centre.

Until April 2003, IMBs in prisons were known as Boards of Visitors and IMBs in immigration removal centres were known as Visiting Committees.

Boards consist of members of the public who are unpaid volunteers, appointed by the Minister of Justice to fulfil this task. Each Board reports annually to the Justice Minister with all their findings and at other times regarding matters of serious concern. Research suggests that there are a number of issues relating to the use of volunteers to ensure oversight of prisons and detention centres. The concerns relate to the information that boards are creating and communicating to the minister and within the annual reports they produce.

The success rate of applicants to be members of boards is about 50%. There are on average between 15 and 20 volunteers per institution. Most members serve more than three years.

Board members can draw keys and have access at any time to every part of the prison or IRC concerned, and to all prisoners or detainees.
