= Tinsley House =

Tinsley House may refer to:

- Tinsley House Immigration Removal Centre, a UK IRC in Gatwick
- Tinsley House (museum), a living history museum, part of the Museum of the Rockies
