= HM Prison Kirkham =

HMP Category D men's prison, near Kirkham, Lancashire

HMP Kirkham
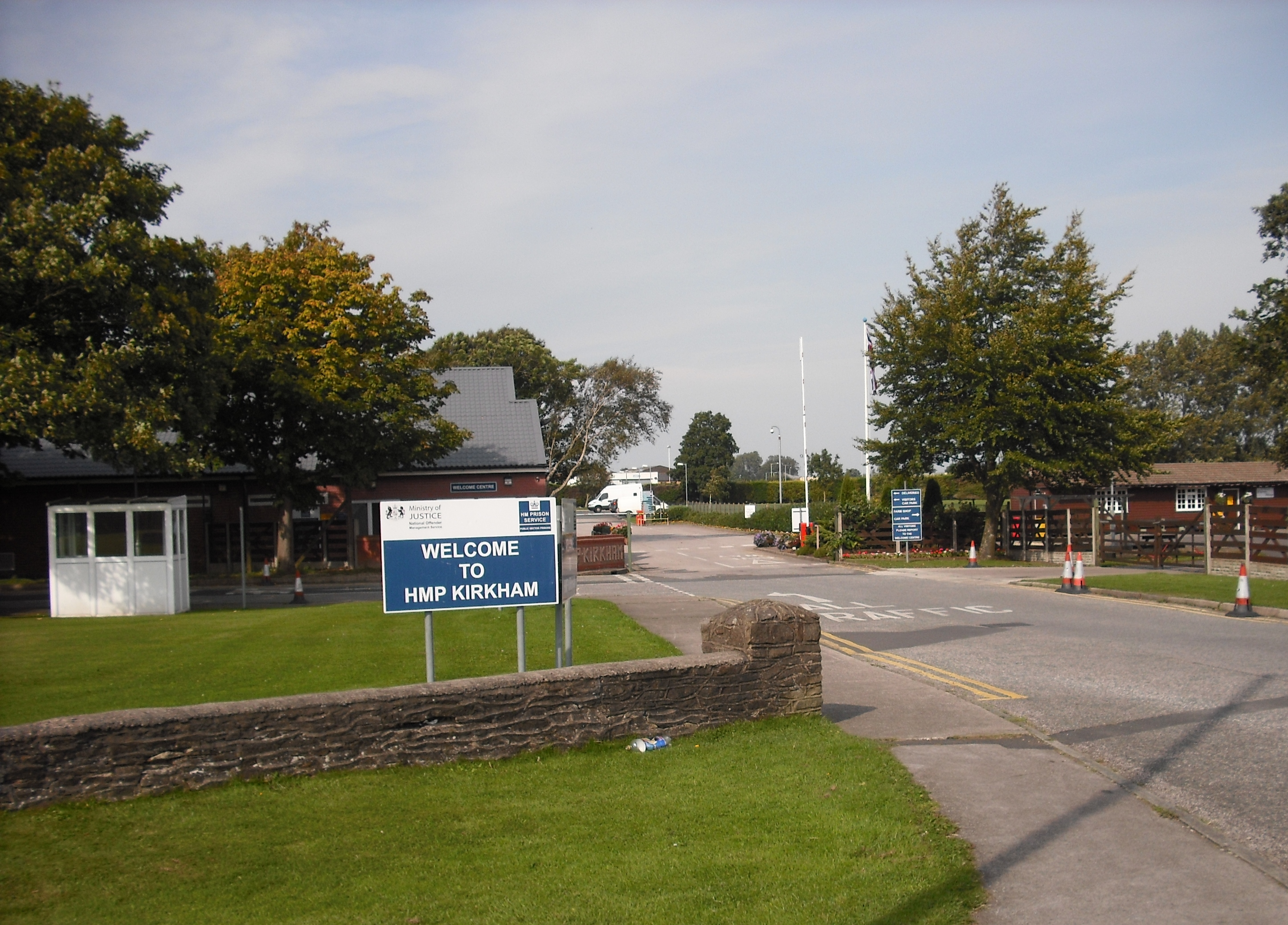

- Shown within Fylde Borough Shown within Lancashire
- Location: Kirkham, Lancashire; 53°46′30″N 2°52′24″W
- Security class: Adult Male/Category D
- Capacity: 700
- Opened: 1962
- Managed by: HM Prison Services
- Governor: Alli Black
- Website: Kirkham at justice.gov.uk

HM Prison Kirkham is a Category D men's prison, located southwest of Kirkham in Lancashire, England. The prison is operated by His Majesty's Prison Service.

== History ==
=== RAF Kirkham ===
The prison's location was originally the site of RAF Kirkham, which was built by George Wimpey on 220 acres (89 ha) of land bordering the A583 road from Blackpool to Preston. Work commenced in 1939 and the camp opened in 1940 as a training camp for RAF tradesmen. Up to 1945 it trained 72,000 British and allied service men and women. In November 1941 Kirkham became the main armament training centre for the RAF, with 21 different trades and 86 different courses on equipment and weapons. Pupils came not only from the Commonwealth of Nations, but the United States, the Netherlands, Poland, France, Norway, Czechoslovakia and Belgium. Kirkham had ten hangars as well as its own cinema and hospital. From May to December 1945 Kirkham became a demob centre. After the war it trained RAF boy entrants until December 1957 when it closed.

=== Kirkham Prison ===
In the early 1960s part of the facility was taken over by the Home Office with HMP Kirkham opening in 1962 as an open prison. The rest of the land lay derelict, but is now used for agricultural purposes and a nature reserve. Today most of the infrastructure, services and buildings of the prison are still of World War II vintage, though prisoner accommodation is located in more modern buildings.

In June 2003 it emerged that Kirkham Prison had seen more prisoners abscond than any other open prison in England and Wales. Statistics showed that 911 inmates had absconded from 1998 to 2003.

In January 2004 Kirkham became the first prison in England (along with HMP Morton Hall) to trial the Intermittent Custody Scheme. The scheme saw some inmates held at Kirkham from Monday to Friday (released at weekends), while another set of prisoners were held on Saturdays and Sundays (released during the week). The scheme was designed to allow prisoners on short sentences to remain in employment, independent housing and maintain family ties during their jail terms. The scheme was subsequently abandoned in November 2006.

In August 2004 the Prison Reform Trust issued statistics revealing that Kirkham had the worst record for inmate drug use of all prisons in England. A survey of drug tests at the prison showed that 35% of inmates tested positive for controlled substances.

In 2011 inmates were involved in a scheme to restore Blackpool trams on behalf of the Friends of Fleetwood Trams.

On 8 April 2025, and following a two-week trial, Kerri Pegg, a former prison governor at Kirkham, was convicted of two counts of misconduct in public office over an affair with a prisoner. On 16 May 2025, Pegg was sentenced to nine years in prison.

== The prison today ==
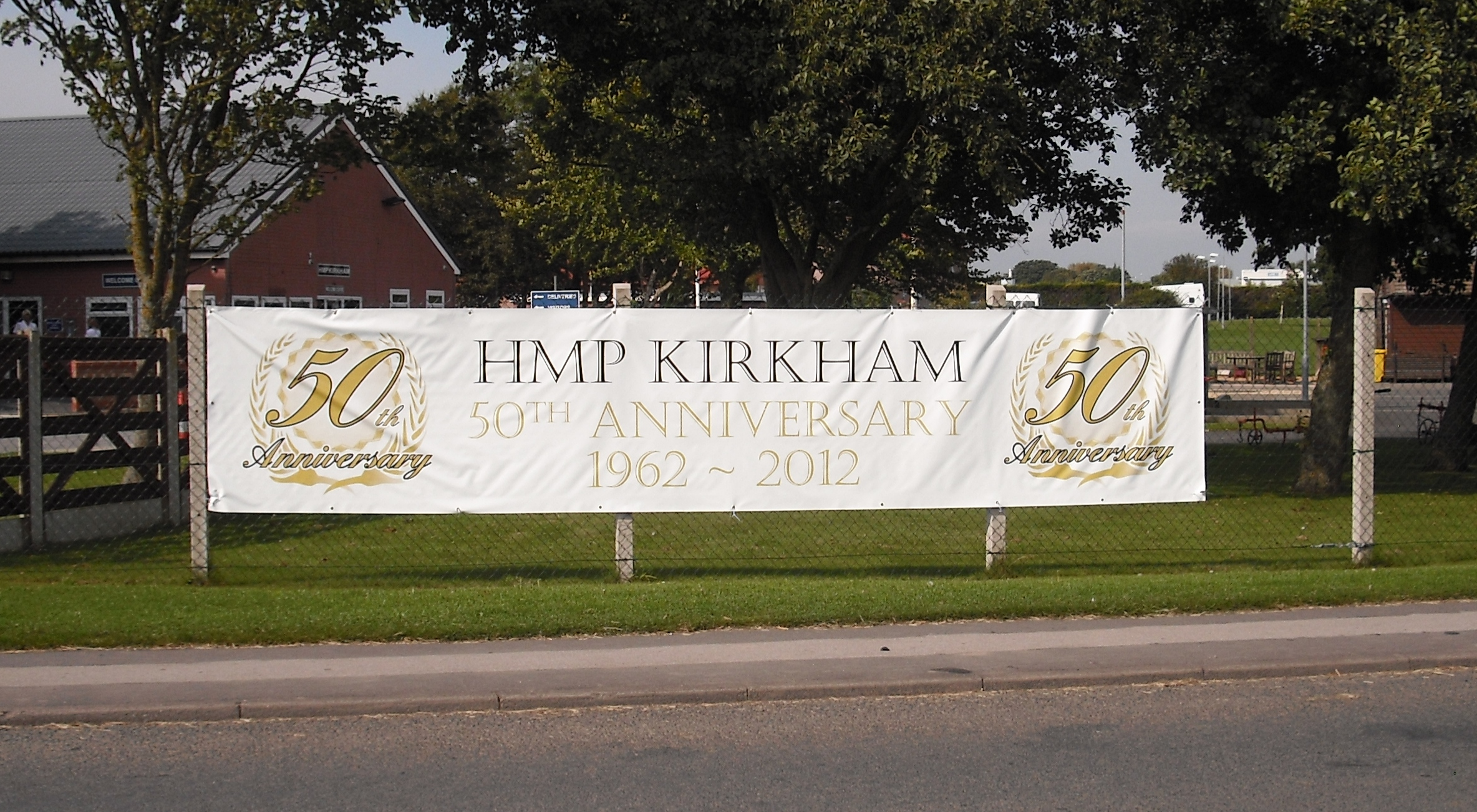
50th anniversary banner, 2012

Kirkham is an open men's prison, and holds Category D prisoners who can reasonably be trusted to serve their sentence in open conditions. Kirkham provides morning and afternoon education provided by The Manchester College. Offenders are also employed in the prison's kitchen, workshops, farms and gardens and works departments.

Kirkham accommodates around 700 prisoners in 28 units. It can house prisoners with physical disabilities, having wheelchair access. The prison is a no-smoking facility.

== Notable former inmates ==
- Gerard Collier, 5th Baron Monkswell
- George Reynolds
- Ian Brown
- Simon Garner
- Jan Mølby
- Mark Ward
