= Rubel Ahmed =

Bangladeshi immigrant to Britain (died 2014)

Rubel Ahmed (died 5 September 2014) was a 26-year-old Bangladeshi immigrant to Britain, who died in Morton Hall immigration detention centre in controversial circumstances. His family called for an independent inquiry.

Rubel Ahmed was the son of Abdul Jalil from Sangirai village, Bishwanath Upazila. He went to live in the United Kingdom in 2009. On 22 July 2014 he was taken from a restaurant in Kent by Immigration Enforcement officers, and held in detention.

On the night of his death, according to other detainees at Morton Hall, Ahmed started complaining of chest pains at around 9.30pm. One detainee reported him "banging and kicking the door asking for help" for over an hour. However, he did not receive the medical attention he needed. An ambulance was called just after 11.30pm, by which time he was not breathing. On the arrival of the ambulance he was pronounced dead.

Ahmed's death led to rioting at the detention centre, until police in riot gear restored order. Ahmed's family only heard of his death after a fellow detainee contacted his solicitor the next day. The Home office informed them that he had committed suicide. Ahmed's body was returned to his family in Bangladesh two weeks later. Protestors in London demanded a full investigation into his death.
