= Unidade Habitacional de Santo António =

The Unidade Habitacional de Santo António (Santo António detention centre), opened in 2006, is an immigration detention centre located in Porto. As of 2009, it was the only officially designated detention centre for immigrants in Portugal. The centre is managed by the Portuguese Immigration and Borders Service (SEF) and falls under the authority of the Ministry of Interior. As of 2007 it had a capacity of 30 adults and six children.

Many of the services for detainees held at the detention centre are provided by non-profit organizations. Through a 2006 Memorandum of Understanding between the Ministry of Interior, the International Organization for Migration, and the Jesuit Refugee Service (JRS), JRS-Portugal provides social and psychological services, as well as legal council to detainees. Additionally, the Swiss NGO Médecins du Monde ensures that detainees have access to medical and psychological consultations.

In 2007, a delegation from the Committee on Civil Liberties, Justice and Home Affairs (LIBE), a standing committee of the European Parliament, visited the Unidade Habitational de Santo António. In their report, the delegation emphasised that while interviewed detainees said they were treated well, the overall detention conditions at the centre are severe.
