= Larne House Short Term Holding Facility =

Immigration detention centre in Northern Ireland

Coordinates: 54.85049110188429°N 5.813436404468354°W

Larne House Short Term Holding Facility is an immigration detention facility in Larne, Northern Ireland, where individuals are held while awaiting decisions on their asylum claim or considered for deportation from the UK for various reasons.

== Description ==
The centre is located in Larne, County Antrim, Northern Ireland. At the time of opening in 2011, it was the UK's first purpose-built detention centre in Northern Ireland.

Larne House is managed by Capita on behalf of Border Force. There are bed spaces for 19 people. The centre was originally managed by Reliance Secure Task Management. The centre has a lounge area, a dining room, a smoking area, a shop, 24-hour healthcare services, laundry services and a multi-faith prayer room. When it originally opened it was planned to hold 21 people, and Amnesty International called for an independent system for monitoring the centre.

== See also ==
- Immigration detention in the United Kingdom
- Modern immigration to the United Kingdom
