= Unauthorised arrival =

Non-citizen who enters a country without satisfying all entry requirements

An unauthorised arrival is a person who has arrived in a country of which they are not a citizen and does not have a valid visa or does not satisfy other required conditions for entry to that country.

A person may be described as an unauthorised arrival when they have crossed a national border with the intention of applying for refugee status, in which case they may be described as an asylum seeker. If a person enters a country without authorisation intending to live and work in that country, they may be described as an illegal immigrant.

Under the United Nations Convention Relating to the Status of Refugees, a person has the right to cross national borders if they are seeking asylum from political repression or various other forms of persecution.

The Universal Declaration of Human Rights declares:

"Everyone has the right to leave any country, including his own, and to return to his country."

== See also ==
- Illegal entry
- Asylum shopping
- Mandatory detention
- Refugee law
- Right of asylum
