= Mental health consequences of immigration detention =

Mental health consequences of immigration detention include higher rates of depression, anxiety, PTSD, schizophrenia conduct issues, hyperactivity, compared to the general population. These harmful impacts exist regardless of past traumatic experiences (e.g., near-death experiences, physical, emotional, or sexual abuse, etc.), age, or nationality, or even time elapsed. Immigration detention may take place at country or state borders, in certain international jurisdiction zones, on offshore islands, boats, camps, or could even be in the form of house arrest. The use of immigration detention around the world has increased recently, leading to greater concerns about the health and wellbeing of detained migrants. A 2018 scoping review from BMC Psychiatry gathered information showing that immigration detention consistently results in negative impacts on detainees.

== Overview ==
The number of refugees globally has increased substantially since 2014. The United Nations High Commissioner for Refugees estimates that at the end of 2019, the number of forcibly displaced persons is at 79.5 million, including internally displaced people (IDP; 45.7 million), refugees (26 million), asylum seekers (4.2 million), and Venezuelans displaced abroad (3.6 million), compared to the 51 million of forcibly displaced persons in 2013, which was already the largest number since World War II.

Many countries detain undocumented immigrants, including asylum seekers and non-citizens. In 2017 and 2018, there were 160,504 detained immigrants in the European Union and the United Kingdom. In 2017 the number went rose to 323,591 in the United States in 2017.

Refugees and asylum seekers are already more vulnerable to mental health consequences, given the physical and mental burden of fleeing one's own country. Detention exacerbates immigrants’ psychological condition, especially depression and post-traumatic stress disorder (PTSD). Numerous studies have examined and pointed out acute and long-term psychological distress among detained immigrants, especially children, making them particularly vulnerable.

Immigration detainees commonly report anxiety, depression, and PTSD during and after detention. Pre-detention stressors include exposure to torture, human trafficking, and other kinds of human rights violations, already putting immigrants at risk for mental health issues. During detention, immigrants have to cope with the loss of liberty, the risk of being forced to return to their country of origin, social isolation, and possible abuse from staff, which may resemble their country of origin, triggering their traumatic experiences.

A meta-analysis examined 17 studies on 1168 participants of immigration detainees, including host countries such as the US, the UK, Canada, Australia, Israel, Japan, Switzerland, and Sweden, and countries of origin ranging from Iran, Iraq, Afghanistan, Palestine, Mexico, Cuba, to other countries in Central America. The wide range of countries suggests a universality in the negative mental health impact of immigration detention. Findings suggest that detention adds additional stressors to immigrants and is associated with greater symptom severity. Additionally, detained refugees suffer from greater symptom severity than non-detained refugees. The duration of detention is linked, the severity of adverse mental health outcomes . It is stated that “the experience of detention may act as a new stressor, which adds to the cumulative effect of exposure to trauma, leading to an increased likelihood of developing mental health difficulties such as PTSD” (p. 2).

== Historical context ==
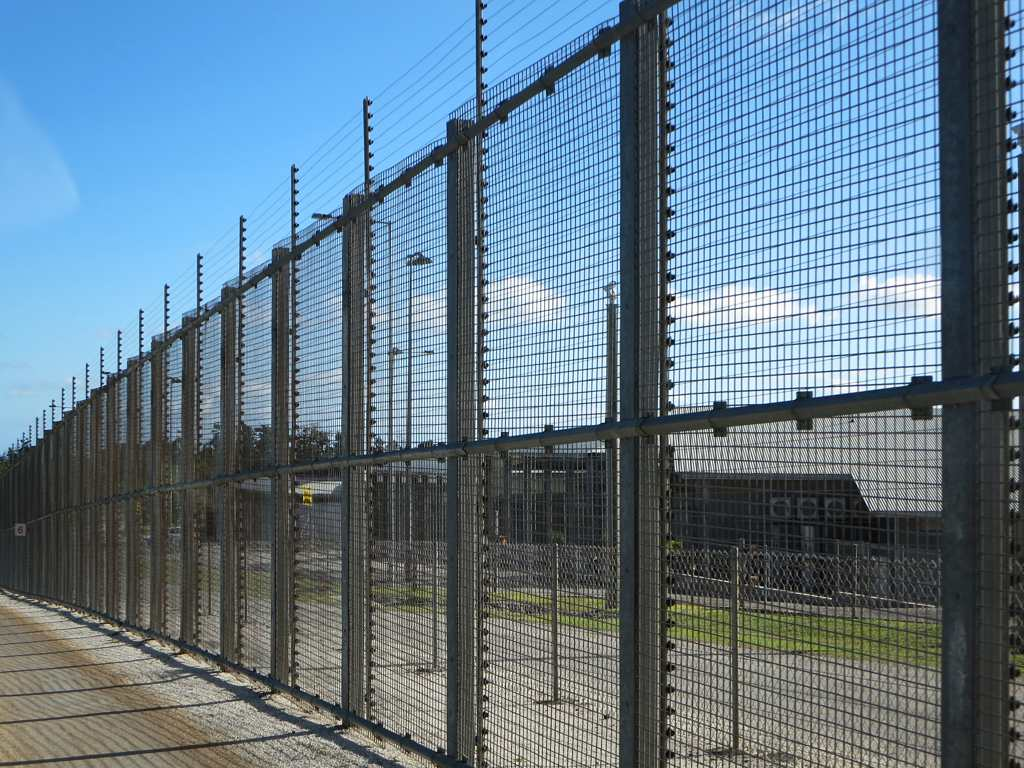
Immigration detention center in Australia used to detain asylum seekers.

The institutionalized use of detention centers began during the 1980s. Before this point, detention was used only in extenuating circumstances, when the state deemed it absolutely necessary. In this context, detainees were held in more improvised locations such as prisons, warehouses, or even hotel rooms. Within the United States, immigration control has been a prominent aspect of national policy since the days of the Chinese Exclusion Act, and even Ellis Island housed a detention center, showing that detention has almost always been part of the US immigration process. In fact, Ellis Island was known as "The Island of Tears" to immigrants. Under President Ronald Reagan in the 1980s, the Immigration and Naturalization Service (INS) began to earnestly detain migrants from the Caribbean, and built numerous detention centers within the US and in Puerto Rico. A major turning point followed, with the passage of the Immigration Control and Reform Act (IRCA) in 1986. The passage of this legislation ensured that immigration control would stay a high priority in policy, and increased the funding for enforcement and detention activities.

As countries such as the United States have put increasing funding and importance towards immigration detention, private prisons have entered the fold. The first private immigration detention center in the US was also established in the mid-1980s, and many other countries in the global north followed suit. For example, the use of Guantanamo Bay as an offshore detention center served as a precedent for Australia to establish offshore immigrant detention centers in Nauru and Papua New Guinea. Overall, using immigrant detention centers, border patrols, and other control measures is an established practice around the world in order to maintain political and social borders created by dominant social groups.

Australia created the Immigration Act 1901, which was passed to restrict all people especially Asians from entering the country to preserve their white citizens. In order for people to stay in the country, they were required to take the dictation test. The dictation test determined whether they could stay within the country. Majority who travelled overseas weren't able to pass the test, thus they were considered unqualified to stay and were deported to their home country by the Australian Government.

Later, Australia issued the Migration Act in 1958, which gives the right to border forces to have integrate coercive powers over people who enter the country without a visa. Under the coercive powers given to officers, they can detain people and send them to detention centers where they will stay until they have a visa or be at risk of being deported. Those who are in the detention centers are given an estimate amount of days on average 625 days in the centers. Majority of the people of all ages, entering the country are refugees from the Middle East and Asia who are seeking asylum in Australia.

Canada had passed numerous immigration acts throughout the years. Some of the legislations and acts created restricted and protected people who entered Canada. The Immigration Act, 1869 was primarily created with specific instructions to protect people who were entering Canada by ship. As the years progressed Canadian government increased its regulations towards immigrants creating the Immigration Act, 1976. It was the official document that was thoroughly detailed on the rules and regulations regarding who of the immigrants were classified as refugees seeking for help and who weren't considered as one. It was a major legislative action taken by the Canadian government.

Canada contains one of the highest rates of immigrant population, according to 2021 Canadian Census. Canada takes pride in being a humanitarian country as they were the first to pass the Canadian Multiculturalism Act, 1988. Which provided security and free of discrimination to all the different cultures and communities within the country. Although, they passed a significant act to those in Canada, there are many who try to get into Canada and if captured by immigration forces, are sent to immigration detention centers, where they too stay more than a year.

== Conditions in detention centers ==
People who are detained in the immigration detention centers often endure the hardships of countless problems such as negligence, learning a second language, overcrowded confinements, rising temperatures in the centers, with lights on the 24 hours, little to no medical care for migrants, discrimination, sickness and more.

In the United States, during President Trump's administration, members of Congress and other government officials visited the immigration detention centers run by Immigration and Customs Enforcement (ICE) and Human Services Administration for Children and Families (ACF) in Texas. Many of which were shocked at what they had encountered, based on the 60 children interviewed many of whom malnourished and sanitation was not appropriate for living conditions. Numerous cases were confirmed that about 540 migrants and some staff members were infected with the mumps disease in Texas. As the number of cases increased in different ICE facilities, and exponential growth of detainees 25,000 doses of vaccines that were administered weren't enough.

There had been severe complaints filed and sent to the Department of Homeland Security's Office of Civil Rights (CRCL) to make a change towards ICE's abusive system within the detention centers. The complaints described the treatment individuals confront and how staff in the centers instead of sending those who are going through mental health to seek medical care, they are sent to solitary confinement. Such treatment of ICE facilities violated the 2019 National Detention Standards for Non-Dedicated Facilities

In Canada, the Canada Border Services Agency (CBSA) detained people as they see fit under the Immigration and Refugee Protection Act. In 2020 Canada detained 8,825 people of which 136 were children on the grounds of migration. Some were sent to maximum security prisons or solitary confinements with no information of how long they will be detained. Those who were African or Caribbean Black descents are brutality treated, shackled, strip-searched and have everything taken away from them.

During COVID-19 there was an increase of disease spread within the confinement's. Pregnant women had miscarriages, whenever the women needed medical care it was poor quality, they had high rates of infant mortality, pre-eclampsia, etc.

In Australia, the Refugee Council of Australia (RCOA) have people do weekly visits to detention centers most of who are confronted with several rules and regulations enforced by the Australian Border Force (ABF). Visitors are required to request a 48-hour notice of who they wish to visit. The staff is authorized to refuse the visitor if they see fit, as they limit the number of visitors in the facility. The food a visitor brings has to be eaten during the visiting period or it will be discarded. The overall treatment towards visitors isn’t welcoming, as the rules keep increasing on what visitors can and can’t use, bring, and do prior to visiting.

== Common mental health outcomes ==
The most common mental health outcomes observed in detained immigrants are post-traumatic stress disorder, depression, anxiety, and suicidality (including self-harm, suicidal ideations, suicide attempts, and suicide). The following sections will detail the reasons behind these higher rates, including testimony from detained migrants.

=== Post-traumatic stress disorder (PTSD) ===
A study from the International Journal of Public Health interviewed asylum seekers detained in Canada. The results revealed that "being treated like criminals" and being forced to wait for "indeterminate periods of time" during which they had little control was detrimental to their mental health. In addition, the study revealed that the violence and lack of control resulted in retraumatization for asylum seekers who had previously endured trauma.

=== Depression ===
Similarly, a UNHCR team observed the mental health of detained asylum seekers on Manus Island and found that 90% of them could have been diagnosed with major depressive disorder, generalized anxiety disorder, or PTSD. Detained refugees in Australia and offshore detention centers said that "life in detention was meaningless” and talked about feelings of extreme hopelessness and loneliness. Even after being released from detention, depression seemed to be the most prominent mental health related issue for the refugees interviewed.

=== Anxiety ===
During detention, asylum seekers and refugees both experienced symptoms of anxiety related to the uncertainty and lack of control while in detention. Fear of violence within the center and perceived lack of justice in relation to visa processing only added to these feelings. Furthermore, many refugees interviewed after release in Australia reported extreme symptoms of anxiety and intrusive thoughts related to their time in detention.

=== Suicidality ===
A case study focusing on Australia's Nauru Regional Processing Center identifies suicidal ideations and suicide attempts by one detainee, and highlights the gap in suicide prevention in the detention center. According to this study, the factors behind this detainee's suicide attempts included long periods of detention, no knowledge of when they would be released, and the endlessly delayed and unjust legal process.

A case study working with limited data from the UK found the rate of self-harm requiring medical attention to be around 13% – at a conservative estimate. Among this population, 72% of detained asylees were already living with depression, However, this particular study showed that there is an extreme lack of information on self-harm and suicide within detention centers.

"'There is a big possibility that I kill myself here. Everyday I am dying slowly. What have I brought my family to?'" – a detainee in an Australian immigration detention center.

=== Schizophrenia ===
There was a study published by the American Journal of Psychiatry that analyzed previously published studies conducted from 1977 to 2013. The purpose was to understand how schizophrenia correlates to minority migrants of low socioeconomic status. The study gathered 18 published studies that met their criteria of migrants from different countries such as Australia, Sweden, Denmark and the United Kingdom. The study classified the different groups based on skin color, potentiality of higher risk of schizophrenia, and their economic status from the country of birth is relevant to the developmental of schizophrenia. With all the studies gathered and multiple analyses done, they calculated a mean of 2.9 with a 95% confidence level of first-generation and second-generation male and female migrants having a higher risk of schizophrenia.

The study concluded with the idea that previous family history too, is a cause on generations having schizophrenia, but also argues that the environment in which the migrant is in is a contribution in the increasing risk of schizophrenia.

== Family separation ==
Particularly over the past few decades in the United States, family separation has been used as policy of deterrence against migrants. Policies such as expedited removal and the general criminalization of immigrants crossing the border without proper documentation, as well as Trump's Zero Tolerance Policy, have effectively created the conditions under which family separation occurs in the United States.

Through recent research, family separation has been strongly linked to negative mental health outcomes, particularly for migrants who have experienced prior trauma such as refugees or asylum seekers. Interviews with several refugee families after their resettlement in the United States showed that family separation was a major stressor. In this case, family separation concerns include fearing for family members that may still be in danger, feeling powerless to help separated family members, and lacking important social, emotional, and cultural connections through family. The same study applied several established measures of mental health and quality of life to the families they interviewed and found that those who were experiencing family separation had higher anxiety, depression, and PTSD levels, and lower quality of life measures compared to those not separated from family members. Psychological recovery after being released from detention hinges heavily upon the stability of the detainee's family, meaning that family separation can have long-term effects even after detention ends.

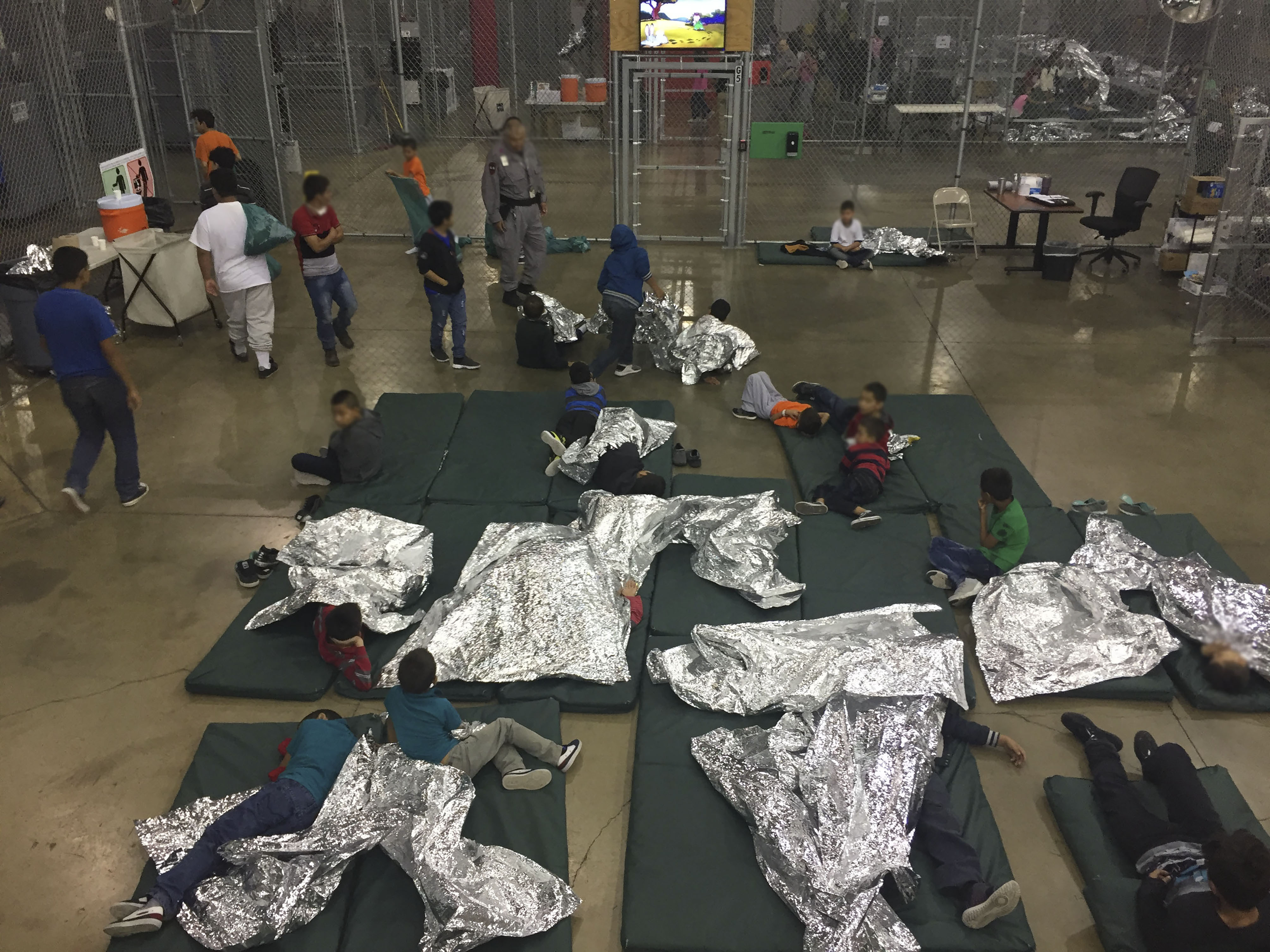
Detention center in Texas, USA

Under typical circumstances of family separation, the parent(s) are criminally detained and investigated while the children are held separately. In US detention centers, parents may be forcibly removed from holding cells with their children without warning or a chance to say goodbye, and no knowledge of if or when they will be reunited. Because of the already adverse effects of immigration detention, separating parents from children causes even greater trauma to parents, and disrupting their ability to care for their children even after reunification.

"Lidia expressed difficulty connecting with her son out of fear that, if immigration authorities separate them again via detention or deportation, being attached would potentially contribute to re-traumatization. This reflects the great impact the trauma of separation continues to have on Lidia and her ability to provide secure attachment to her son." – personal accounts from staff at the Terra Firma Program in New York

Furthermore, family separation has profound impact on the psychological health of children, which will be discussed in a later section in greater detail.

== Special populations ==
=== Women ===
The specific experiences of detained migrant women are often overlooked. Interviews with detention officers in Greece revealed that detained women are often culturally stereotyped and sexualized while in detention. In the United States, thousands of instances of sexual violence against detained women have been reported, many of the cases being perpetrated by Immigration and Customs Enforcement (ICE) officers. While women are not the only targets of sexual violence, there have been systemic issues with women detainees being raped, filmed in the shower, and otherwise assaulted while in detention. In the United States between 2012 and 2018, there were about 1,500 reported cases of sexual assault in ICE detention centers, not to mention the cases that go unreported.

Family separation also has special impacts on women, especially mothers. Mothers who undergo their own trauma and then experience separation from their children can result in unhealthy attachment between parent and child, and can make the mother less responsive to the needs of their child. Firsthand accounts from separated mothers describe how their children were told that their mothers did not want them, resulting in extreme distress and PTSD for the mothers and children after release and reunification.

=== Children and adolescents ===
Among detained immigrants in the US, children and adolescents––those under 18 years of age––are especially vulnerable, partly due to the overlap of traumatic experiences with critical developmental stages. After examining 425 immigrant children that were detained in the US, a study has found that 17% had a probable PTSD diagnosis, more than triple of the lifetime prevalence of PTSD among adolescents, i.e., those who have had PTSD at some point in their lives. Traumatic events have a significant effect on young children (ages 4–8), harming their emotional and behavioral development. This results in conduct issues or hyperactivity. Additionally, children who were forced to separate from their mothers have demonstrated even more distress.

Most children arrive on boat, to Australia, seeking refugee and protection under the Australian government. Since Australia created the strict regulation of detaining anyone who doesn't acquire a legal visa, children were sent to the detention centers where they don't receive a date to when they are to be free. The average amount of days a child is detained can range from 17 days to 1 year 8 months and 11 days. The number of children being detained are increasing yearly, some arrive unaccompanied and are sent to an alternative detention facility similar to a foster home.

=== Gender and sexual minorities ===
Looking at refugees and asylum seekers migrating from North Africa, the Middle East, and Central/South Asia to Austria and the Netherlands, many of them are LGBTQIA+ individuals. Some of these regions have laws criminalizing same-sex relations, which resulted in the traumatic persecution of LGBTQIA+ individuals prior to their departure from their homes. This prior trauma can include social alienation in addition to physical and sexual violence. During and after the migration process, LGBTQIA+ migrants are still vulnerable to discrimination and violence from other migrants, detention officers, and even service providers. In particular, transgender migrants have reported instances of violence and rape during their journeys. These instances are heightened for transgender individuals who may not pass as cisgender, or who do not take special measures to present as the sex they were assigned at birth.

== Long term consequences ==
Long term stressors that may affect refugees and immigrants include acculturation difficulties, isolation, discrimination, poor living conditions, poor healthcare, etc. However, deleterious effects of detention, compounded by the length of detention, may continue to exist long after release from centers. Even if detention is temporary, its consequences are not. Not all immigrants develop depression, anxiety, PTSD, or other psychological disorders. An Australian study examining 241 Arabic-speaking immigrants have found that after a mean of 3 years following release from detention centers, more than half of those who were detained for more than 6 months still show clinical depression, nearly doubling the percentage of those who were detained for 1–5 months. This is independent of past traumatic experiences. Future studies are needed to determine more substantial long-term effects of immigration detention.

A study was done demonstrating how non-citizens and citizen Latinos are both psychologically threatened with deportation. The study signified an increase in psychological distress during Trump's national election towards non-citizens as they were the most affected. They didn't see it as much of a change for the other group, until 30 days later with the announcement of DACA and DAPA being rescinded. It was concluded that both groups are significantly impacted to the national deportation threats as they target individuals or the family members of the individuals impacted. The fear is still induced within the individual of being separated from their loved ones years after Trump's administration.

== Alternatives to detention ==
Alternatives to detention refers to a set of policies and procedures related to immigration that does not rely on detaining and confining migrants, refugees, and asylum seekers. Alternatives to detention come in several forms such as parole, bail, family or community detention, case management, electronic tracking, welcoming visitations, house arrest, and voluntary return incentives. Currently, alternatives to detention are becoming codified into law and practice to an extent in countries around the world. Most member countries of the European Union have incorporated laws that provide alternatives to detention. The United States has a risk assessment tool used to determine if vulnerable migrants are allowed to be placed in alternatives to detention.

Recognizing that the people who are coming in to first world countries are humans who have tried to enter with a purpose of seeking asylum. Most of the children are from the age of 1 to 12, Jesuit Social Services argues that children shouldn't be locked up and sending them to the detention centers should be the last resort. The rules and regulations for visitations should stay consistent so the visiting processes can go smooth. Visitors have an impact on people who are going through mental challenges, as it's an opportunity where the migrant feels heard and have someone to confide in.

One of the leading theoretical models for detention alternatives is the Community Assessment and Placement model (CAP). The basis of this model lies in the concept that detention is not necessary in the first place, and that migrants should be allowed freedom of movement. Based on the individual's health, identity, vulnerability, etc., the next step is to find a safe community setting. Ideally, this would include legal and interpretation services, accommodation and food, and case managers. Finally, any additional control measures can be put in place in the community if found to be necessary–with detention only being used if absolutely necessary. Alternatives to detention such as the CAP model, and other models based on meeting migrant needs, have positive effects on mental health. On the other hand, heavy surveillance requirements can have negative mental health impacts. For particularly vulnerable populations such as children, even community detention can result in physical and psychological harm.

Ultimately the push towards alternatives to detention is a shift away from criminalizing immigrants, and towards a human-rights centered treatment of migrants. According to various studies on the topic, individualized case management and public services are important parts of a successful model. In areas where money is directed towards private detention centers, funding may need to be redirected to social services and public resources instead. However, some migrant rights advocates argue that alternatives to detention still represent confinement and incarceration in less overt ways. Freedoms and rights of migrants are still policed and restricted under alternatives to detention, so other solutions may need to be investigated further.
