= HM Prison Morton Hall =

Category C men's prison in Lincolnshire, England

Coordinates: 53.1678°N 0.6871°W

HMP Morton Hall
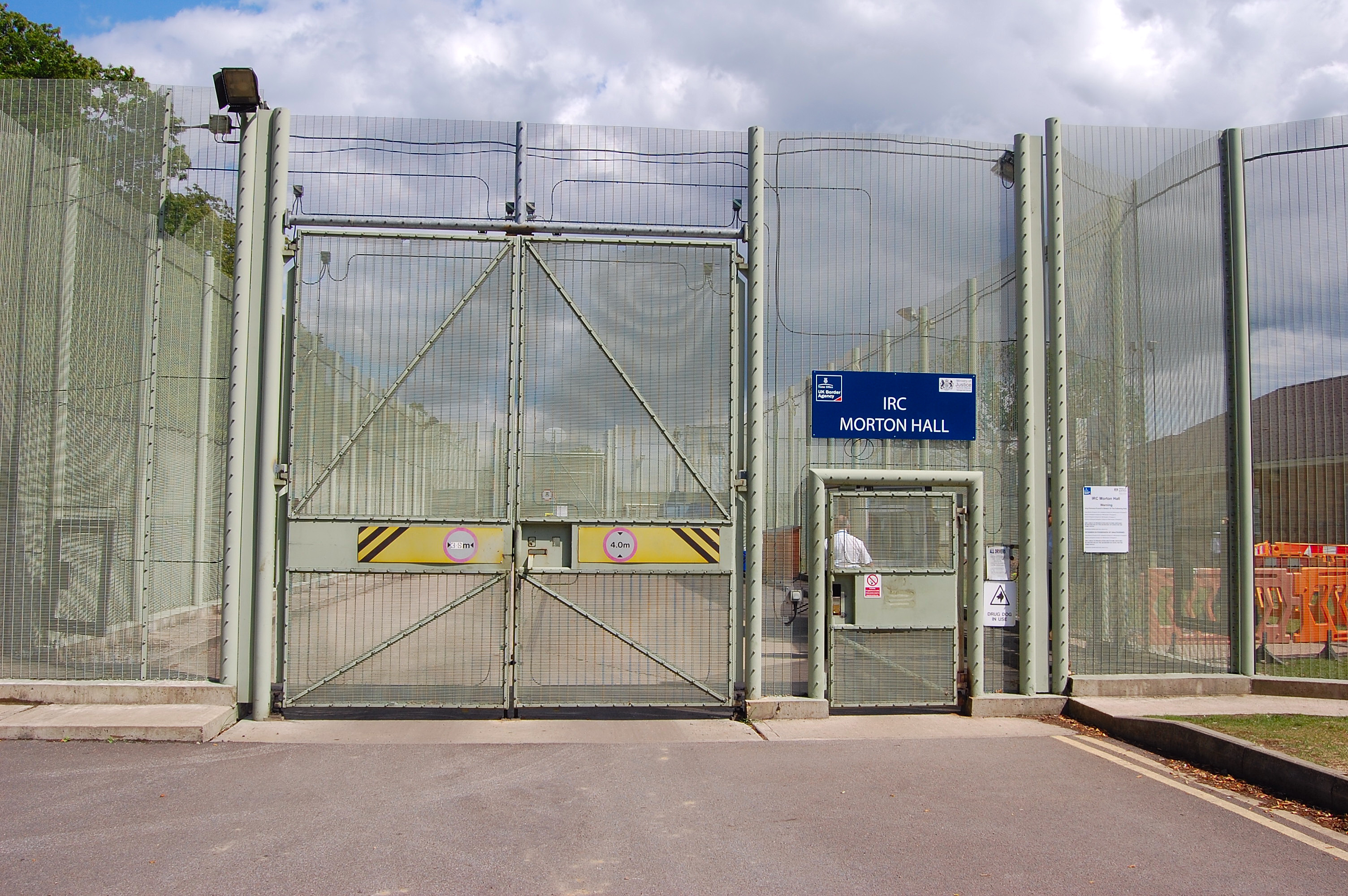
- Interactive map of HMP Morton Hall
- Location: Morton Hall, Lincolnshire
- Security class: Adult Male/Category C
- Population: 392 (October 2006)
- Opened: 1985
- Former name: Morton Hall Immigration Removal Centre
- Managed by: HM Prison Services
- Governor: Karen Head
- Website: Morton Hall at justice.gov.uk

HM Prison Morton Hall is a Category C men's prison in the village of Morton Hall, Lincolnshire, England. The centre is operated by His Majesty's Prison Service. It was previously a women's prison and from 2011 to 2021, an Immigration Removal Centre.

== History ==
Morton Hall was originally the site of an RAF base, which was converted into a prison and opened in 1985. It was expanded in 1996, and refitted to become a semi-open women's prison in 2001. Two ready to use units were opened in 2002, increasing overall capacity. From that time Morton Hall has been developing as a prison holding a high percentage of foreign nationals.

In January 2004, Morton became the first prison in England (along with HMP Kirkham) to trial the Intermittent Custody Scheme. The scheme saw some inmates held at Morton Hall from Monday to Friday (released at weekends), while another set of prisoners were held on Saturdays and Sundays (released during the week). The scheme was designed to allow prisoners on short sentences to remain in employment, independent housing and maintain family ties during their jail terms. The scheme was subsequently abandoned in November 2006.

In May 2004, a report from the Prison Reform Trust called for more facilities and support for foreign prisoners held at Morton Hall. The Trust noted improvements at the jail, but stated that more resources and staff training were needed to improve the regime at Morton Hall.

Morton Hall was recategorised as a closed women's prison in 2009. The prison held a high percentage of foreign nationals, and had a resettlement unit for prisoners coming to the end of their sentence who were settling in the UK.

In 2011 Morton Hall closed and re-opened as an Immigration Removal Centre, holding adult males awaiting deportation. The centre was formally opened on 1 June 2011 by Immigration Minister Damian Green.

In April 2015 several detainees started refusing food, in solidarity with a hunger strike at Harmondsworth immigration detention centre.

Morton Hall ceased operating as an Immigration Removal Centre in July 2021; in December that year it reverted to being a prison, and was designated for 'male foreign national offenders'. Lincolnshire's Police and Crime Commissioner confirmed that, "the intention is that the majority of inmates will move back to their place of origin (or be deported) on release."

== Deaths in custody ==
On 5 September 2014 Rubel Ahmed, a 26-year-old detainee, died in controversial circumstances at Morton Hall, resulting in rioting and prompting calls for an independent inquiry.

During the period 2016–2017, four people died in custody at Morton Hall.

=== Attempted deportation of witnesses ===
In April 2018, Home Secretary Amber Rudd was barred by the High Court from her attempt to deport a witness before he could give evidence to an inquest into the death of Carlington Spencer at Morton Hall.

In February 2019, it emerged that the Home Office intended to deport two other key witnesses in the inquest of Spencer's death, before they would be able to give testimony. They were due to give evidence in March 2019. The witnesses accused the Home Office of attempting to cover up the events leading to Spencer's death, by preventing their evidence from being heard in court.
