= Gwarzo Abdullahi Muazu =

Nigerian politician

Gwarzo Abdullahi Muazu (born 1978) is a Nigerian politician serving as the representative for the Kabo/Gwarzo Federal Constituency in the House of Representatives at the National Assembly in Kano State since 2023. He is affiliated with the All Progressives Congress (APC).
