= Immigration detention in the United Kingdom =

Immigration detention in the United Kingdom is the practice of indefinite detention of both foreign national asylum seekers/refugees and immigrants in purpose-built detention centres for the purpose of immigration control. Unlike some other countries, UK provisions to detain are not outlined in a codified constitution. Instead, immigration enforcement holds individuals under Powers granted in the Immigration Act 1971 and by the Home Office Detention Centre Rules (2001). The expressed purpose of immigration detention is to "effect removal; initially to establish a person's identity or basis of claim; or [implement] where there is reason to believe that the person will fail to comply with any conditions attached to a grant of immigration bail." Detention can only lawfully be exercised under these provisions where there is a "realistic prospect of removal within a reasonable period".

In 2019, a majority of immigration detainees were individuals who were seeking, or had claimed, asylum (58%). Other individuals liable for detention include those held while awaiting determination of their right to enter the UK, people who have been refused permission to enter and are awaiting removal, people who have overstayed the expiry of their visas or have not complied with their visa terms, and people lacking the required documentation to live in the UK.

The British Home Office currently operates one Pre-Departure Accommodation, three residential Short Term Holding Facilities (STHFs), seven Immigration Removal Centres (IRCs) and 13 In-Use Short-Term Holding Facilities which can be used to detain individuals under Immigration Act Powers. HM Prisons are also used as settings of detention under Immigration Powers, usually if the detainee was serving a prison sentence which expired.

The management of a majority of IRCs is outsourced to private companies — typically those with a record or running privatised prisons — including Mitie, GEO Group, G4S and Serco.

The Nationality, Immigration and Asylum Act 2002 formally changed the name of "detention centres" to "removal centres".

== Locations ==
As of February 2025, the active facilities are:

- Brook House Immigration Removal Centre near Gatwick Airport, run by Serco
- Colnbrook Immigration Removal Centre near Heathrow Airport, run by Mitie
- Derwentside Immigration Removal Centre, Consett, Durham, run by Serco
- Dungavel Immigration Removal Centre in Lanarkshire, run by Mitie
- Harmondsworth Immigration Removal Centre also near Heathrow Airport, run by Mitie
- Larne House Short Term Holding Facility, Larne, County Antrim, run by Tascor, a subsidiary of Capita
- Manchester Short Term Holding Facility, at Manchester Airport, run by Tascor, a subsidiary of Capita
- Swinderby Short Term Holding Facility, Lincolnshire, run by Mitie
- Tinsley House Immigration Removal Centre near Gatwick Airport, run by Serco
- Yarl's Wood Immigration Removal Centre in Bedfordshire, run by Serco

Processing facilities are also operated at the Strait of Dover for the processing of migrants who have crossed the English Channel:

- Kent Intake Unit
- Manston arrivals and processing centre

== Policies ==
The British government has been given powers to detain asylum seekers and migrants at any stage of the asylum process. The use of asylum has increased with the introduction of the process of "fast track", or the procedure by which the Immigration Service assess asylum claims which are capable of being decided quickly. Fast-tracking takes place in Oakington Reception Centre, Harmondsworth and Yarl's Wood.

There are three situations in which it is lawful to detain an asylum seeker or migrant.

1. To fast track their claim
2. If the government has reasonable grounds to believe that the asylum seeker or migrant will abscond or not abide by the conditions of entry.
3. If the asylum seeker or migrant is about to be deported.

Figures published for January – March 2008 by the Home Office revealed the following:

- 2305 people were detained in "removal centres" in the UK under Immigration Act powers (this figure excludes those held in prisons)
- 1980 immigration detainees were male
- 35 children under 18 were detained
- 1640 detainees had claimed asylum at some stage

Once detained it is possible to apply for bail. It is preferable but not necessary to provide a surety and conditions will be provided, usually reporting, if bail is granted. There is legal aid for representation at bail hearings and the organisation Bail for Immigration Detainees provides help and assistance for those subject to detention to represent themselves.

Since summer 2005 there has been an increase in the detention of foreign nationals since the Charles Clarke scandal which revealed that there were a number of foreign nationals who had committed crimes and had not been deported at the end of their sentence.

Criticism of immigration detention focuses on comparisons with prison conditions in which persons are kept though they have never been convicted of a crime, the lack of judicial oversight, and on the lengthy bureaucratic delays that often prevent a person from being released, particularly when there is no evidence that the detainee will present a harm or a burden to society if allowed to remain at large while their situation is examined.

Recently, the conditions of detention centres have been criticised, by the United Kingdom Inspector of Prisons.

== The Tinsley Model ==
In 1996 Immigration Detention Centre Tinsley House was commissioned. It was the first purpose-built immigration detention facility in the United Kingdom and was initially managed by the British subsidiary of the American Wackenhut Corporation.

The original senior management of Tinsley House, specifically the centre director and its operations manager, pioneered an adapted version of Wackenhut's philosophy of "Dynamic Security" that promoted a regime of caring custody, emphasising positive relations between staff and detainees and encouraging the respectful and sensitive handling of all detainee related issues.

This concerned approach towards detainee management was quickly embraced by the centre's chaplain, who reinforced the existing commitment to caring custody through the creation of specialised training programmes for the centre's staff and by increasing the size and diversity of the centre's chaplaincy team.

With the active support of the centre's senior management, the Tinsley House chaplaincy set about the task of addressing in detail the dietary, cultural, religious and social needs of the centre's population inviting a variety of religious ministers and representatives of cultural groups to attend the centre to provide pastoral support. Tinsley House became the first detention centre in the United Kingdom to operate a comprehensive regime of religious and cultural observance and to operate a diversity of permanent religious facilities.

The attention to religious and cultural needs combined with an overt commitment on the part of the detention centre staff towards treating those in their custody with care and sensitivity began to impact the environment and operations at Tinsley House. Detainees would write messages of appreciation to members of staff noting their efforts of assistance and staff would regularly form respectful friendships with those in their charge.

The product of this regime, which became known as the "Tinsley Model" was to result in an environment which, during its first decade of operations, incurred no incidence of death, riot or disturbance; a performance which remains unmatched in the history of the UK Immigration Service.

The "Tinsley Model" attracted the attention of the Prince of Wales as well as numerous religious and political leaders and was cited as being a graphic example of the effectiveness of "caring custody".

In December 2001 the senior chaplain of Tinsley House authored a report to the Home Secretary detailing the essence of the Tinsley Model, recording its positive effects and outlining how this regime might be exported throughout the Immigration estate. The report was signed by sixteen bishops, four leading Muslim clerics, representatives of the Sikh and Hindu communities, four members of the House of Lords and the Member of Parliament for Crawley.

The Home Office response to this proposal was to pass it to the Immigration Minister who forwarded it to the head of the Immigration Service who in turn requested that it be actioned by the director responsible for Detention Operations. The Detention Operations department of the Immigration Service did not accept the findings of the report and expressed their displeasure at the centre's operating company (now Group 4) "interfering" in government policy issues and which resulted in the suspension of the centre's senior chaplain.

A month after this report was published; the newest facility in the Immigration estate, the £40 million Yarl's Wood detention centre near Bedford was largely destroyed by fire as a result of altercations between staff and detainees.

With a lack of support from the Immigration Service, the introduction of Group 4's management style (with its largely prison based philosophies) and the departure of the centre's original management team, the "Tinsley Model" became increasingly difficult to maintain resulting in a decline in the centre's previously caring regime.

In 2009 an unannounced inspection of Tinsley House by HM Chief Inspector of Prisons reported that "conditions had generally deteriorated and the arrangements for children and single women were now wholly unacceptable" and that "staff talked openly about an increased prison culture encroaching on Tinsley House's previously relaxed atmosphere". The gradual erosion of the centre's initial regime of "Caring Custody" effectively marked the end of the "Tinsley Model" and with it the dynamic of the chaplaincy's intensive pastoral care which had been a fundamental feature of the model.

== Deaths in immigration custody ==
The Government does not routinely publish the number of detainees who die in custody, but data mapping by INQUEST suggests that a further three individuals died while being held under Immigration Act Powers during 2016, nine in 2017, three in 2018 and one in 2019. In 2018, the Government announced that it would begin publishing data on deaths in IRCs for the first time. However, the definitive annual number of deaths in detention remain unknown, as quarterly Home Office statistics do not differentiate between deaths and detainees leaving detention for "other" reasons.

In total, there have been at least 40 deaths in immigration custody since 1989, including:

- 1989
  - Siho Iyiguveni – 8 October 1989 - Harmondsworth Detention Centre
- 1990
  - Kimpua Nsimba – 15 June 1990 - Harmondsworth Detention Centre
- 2000
  - Robertus Grabys – Suicide by hanging, aged 49 24 January 2000 - Harmondsworth Detention Centre
- 2003
  - Michael Bodnarchuk - Suicide by hanging, aged 42, 31 January 2003 - Haslar Detention Centre
  - Olga Blaskevica – Murdered by husband, aged 29, 7 May 2003 - Harmondsworth Detention Centre
- 2004
  - Kabeya Dimuka-Bijoux - Collapsed while running, aged 34, 1 May 2004 - Haslar Detention Centre
  - Sergey Barnuyck – Suicide by hanging, aged 31, 19 July 2004 - Harmondsworth Detention Centre
  - Tran Quang Tung – Suicide by hanging, aged 24, 23 July 2004 - Dungavel Detention Centre
  - Kenny Peter – Suicide by hanging, aged 24, 7 November 2004 - Colnbrook Detention Centre
- 2005
  - Unknown male – AIDS, aged 33, 14 March 2005 - Oakington Detention Centre
  - Ramazan Kumluca – Suicide by hanging, aged 18, 27 June 2005 - Campsfield Detention Centre
  - Manuel Bravo – Suicide by hanging, aged 35, 15 September 2005 - Yarl's Wood Detention Centre
- 2006
  - Bereket Yohannes – Suicide by hanging, aged 26, 19 January 2006 - Harmondsworth Detention Centre
  - Oleksiy Baronovsky – Self harm (cutting), aged 34, 10 June 2006 - HMP Rye Hill
- 2008
  - Unknown male – Tuberculosis, aged 32, 1 September 2008 - Colnbrook Detention Centre
- 2009
  - Richard Abeson – Liver cancer, aged 69, 23 October 2009 - HMP Wandsworth
- 2010
  - Eliud Nguli Nyenze – Heart attack, aged 40, 15 April 2010 - Oakington Detention Centre
  - Reza Ramazani – Coronory condition, aged 56, 23 March 2010 - HMP Nottingham
  - Jimmy Mubenga – Unlawful killing, aged 46, 12 October 2010 - Aircraft, discharged from Brook House Detention Centre
- 2011
  - Riluwanu Balogan – Suicide by hanging, aged 21, 16 May 2011 - HM Glen Parva
  - Muhammed Shuket, Heart attack, aged 47, 2 July 2011 - Colnbrook Detention Centre
  - Brian Dalrymple – Schizophrenia, hypertension, aged 35, 31 July 2011 - Colnbrook Detention Centre
  - Ianos Dragutan – Suicide by hanging, aged 31, 2 August 2011 - Campsfield Detention Centre
  - Rene Frings – Heart disease, aged 44, 23 November 2011 - HMP Wormwood Scrubs
  - Gonzales Jorite - Tuberculosis, aged 40, 6 December 2011 - Harmondsworth Detention Centre
- 2012
  - Kwabena Fosu - Sudden adult death syndrome, aged 31, 30 October 2012 - Harmondsworth Detention Centre
  - Unknown male – Rheumatic valve disease, aged 43, 17 November 2012 - Harmondsworth Detention Centre
- 2013
  - Alois Dvorzac – Heart attack in dementia, aged 84, 10 February 2013 - Harmondsworth Detention Centre
  - Khalid Shahzad – Suspected heart attack, aged 52, 30 March 2013 - Pennine House Immigration Reception Centre
  - Tahir Mehmood – Heart attack, aged 43, 26 July 2013 - Pennine House Immigration Reception Centre
- 2014
  - Mohamoud Ali – Sudden death in epilepsy, aged 36, 1 February 2014 - HMP Parc
  - Christine Case – Pulmonary embolism, aged 40, 30 March 2014 - Yarls Wood
  - Bruno dos Santos – Neurosarcoidosis, aged 26, 4 June 2014 - HMP The Verne
  - Rubel Ahmed – Suicide by hanging, aged 26, 5 September 2014 - IRC Morton Hall Lincoln
- 2015
  - Pinakinbhai Patel – Heart attack, aged 33, 20 April 2015 - Yarls Wood
  - Thomas Kirung – Suicide by hanging, aged 30, 6 August 2015 - HMP The Verne
- 2016
  - Amir Siman-Tov – Suicide by overdose, aged 41, 17 February 2016 - Colnbrook Detention Centre
  - Unknown – 1 December 2016 - Colnbrook Detention Centre
  - Unknown male – Murdered, aged 49, 30 November 2016 - IRC Morton Hall Lincoln
  - Tarek Chowdhury - Murdered, aged 34, 30 December 2016 - IRC Morton Hall Lincoln
- 2017
  - Branko Zdravkovic – Suicide, aged 43, 9 April 2017
  - Carlington Spencer – Stroke, aged 27, 3 October 2017 - IRC Morton Hall Lincoln
- 2023
  - Frank Ospina – Suicide by strangulation, aged 39, 26 March 2023 - IRC Harmondsworth
  - Alfred Dosku - Diead age 37 on the 17 November 2023 after being found at IRC Brook House it was decided that his death was self-inflicted, his inquest concluded in July 2025.
  - Leonard Farruku - Found unresponsive in a shower cubicle on board Bibby Stockholm on 12th December 2023.
