= Derwentside Immigration Removal Centre =

Immigration detention facility in England

Coordinates: 54°52′33″N 1°49′46″W

Derwentside Immigration Removal Centre (Derwentside IRC) is a detention facility in County Durham used to house women waiting for deportation from the UK. Opened in late 2021 despite opposition from Durham County Council, the facility was initially operated by Mitie under a two-year contract. In 2023, the operation of the facility was taken over by Serco, who were awarded a nine-year contract with Immigration Enforcement to operate the site. As of 2021, the site had capacity for 84 women.

== Controversies ==
In March 2022, it was revealed that Mitie was under investigation by the Competition and Markets Authority for alleged anti-competitive conduct pertaining to the bidding for the initial contract to operate Derwentside. A Mitie spokesperson clarified that the company felt confident that they had "no case to answer for". In February 2023, the CMA closed its investigation, concluding that there were no grounds for further action.

Following an unannounced visit in August 2022, HM Chief Inspector of Prisons expressed a number of concerns pertaining to the facility. Inspectors criticised the remoteness of the facility, which meant that women housed there were not able to receive many visits, and that mobile phone reception was poor. Use of force at the facility was not always carried out in a professional manner and oversight was lacking. Nevertheless, inspectors concluded that staff had "mostly good relationships" with detainees.

In December 2022, roughly a dozen campaigners protested at the site, warning that the removal centre causes distress for vulnerable people.

In October 2024, hundreds of protesters gathered at the site. Campaigners expressed concerns that the rural facility was "cruel, isolating and unnecessary" and that between 70 and 80 per cent of detainees would be released back into UK communities. Responding to the protest, a Home Office spokesperson announced that plans for the site were "under review" following the change in government in July 2024.

== Hassockfield Secure Training Centre ==
The site was registered as the Hassockfield Secure Training Centre with the CQC on 22 March 2011, and operated as a custodial institution for young offenders. The facility closed in 2015.
