= Manchester Short Term Holding Facility =

Immigration detention centre in England

Coordinates: 53.3619°N 2.2877°W

Manchester Short Term Holding Facility is an immigration detention facility in Manchester, England, where individuals are held while awaiting decisions on their asylum claim or considered for deportation from the UK for various reasons.

== Description ==
It is located in the freight terminal of Manchester Airport. Manchester Short Term Holding Facility is managed by security firm Mitie on behalf of the Home Office. The facility replaced Pennine House in 2008.

The centre was originally managed by Reliance Secure Task Management.

In 2022, protests were held outside the facility over the Rwanda asylum plan.

== See also ==
- Immigration detention in the United Kingdom
- Modern immigration to the United Kingdom
