= Mark Ward =

Mark Ward may refer to:

- Mark Ward (footballer, born 1962), English footballer
- Mark Ward (footballer, born 1982), English footballer
- Mark Ward (Gaelic footballer) (born 1985), football player from Ireland
- Mark Ward (politician) (born 1974), Sinn Féin TD for Dublin Mid-West
- Mark Ward, editor of Birds, the magazine of the Royal Society for the Protection of Birds
