= Harmondsworth Immigration Removal Centre =

Immigration detention facility near London Heathrow Airport

Coordinates: 51.484°N 0.484°W

Harmondsworth Immigration Removal Centre is an immigration detention facility in Harmondsworth, London Borough of Hillingdon, near London Heathrow Airport run by Mitie. Harmondsworth neighbours the Colnbrook Immigration Removal Centre. It holds around 620 men.

The centre is located in the area planned for demolition as part of the expansion of Heathrow Airport.

In August of 2024, the chief inspector of prisons, Charlie Taylor, raised concerns about a "worrying deterioration in safety" at Harmondsworth.

== Inspections ==
In 2006, Anne Owers HM Inspector of Prisons (HMIP) reported that Harmondsworth "had been allowed to slip into a culture and approach which was wholly at odds with its stated purpose" further "It is essentially a problem of management, and it is of some concern that this had not been fully identified and resolved earlier by the contractor and the Immigration and Nationality Directorate."

In January 2008, the Chief Inspector and her team conducted an unannounced inspection and found significant improvements had been implemented since the last inspection. The Inspection of January 2008 indicated the change programme that was taking place. An extract from the executive summary of the Chief Inspector of Prisons states: ‘'All those met – both staff and detainees – recognised the change that had taken place under the new management. This was confirmed by the evidence of the inspection, which showed improvement in all of our four key areas – safety, respect, purposeful activity and resettlement – though there was still some way to go to ensure that those changes were firmly embedded and could withstand the expansion of the centre to full capacity. [..] We observed a different attitude and approach from staff. Security in the centre was much less intrusive, and support for detainees in the early days had improved noticeably [...]"

Overall, this inspection recorded significant improvement in a centre that has long been of concern to us and the detention authorities. The build-up to reopening had provided space to work with staff to change the culture and approach of the centre. However, managers were aware, and this inspection confirmed, that there was still more to do before the centre expanded to full capacity. Negative staff attitudes had been effectively challenged...

== Deaths and hunger strikes ==
Several detainees have committed suicide while held in Harmondsworth. Robertas Grabys was found hanged in 2000, Sergey Barnuyck was found hanged in 2004, and Bereket Yohannes was found hanged in 2006. An 84-year-old Canadian with Alzheimer's disease, Alois Dvorzac, died there in January 2014.

The Nigerian asylum-seeker Isa Muazu went on hunger strike in 2013. In April 2015, over 200 detainees joined in a collective hunger strike, which subsequently spread to Morton Hall Immigration Removal Centre.

== See also ==
- Immigration detention in the United Kingdom
- Modern immigration to the United Kingdom
