= Isa Muazu =

Nigerian man

Isa Muazu (misspelled in some sources as Ifa Muaza) is a Nigerian man who went on hunger strike while unsuccessfully attempting to claim asylum in the United Kingdom in 2013.

Isa Muazu claimed to have left his home in Nigeria because members of the proscribed Islamist group Boko Haram threatened to kill him if he did not join them. After being held in custody at the Harmondsworth Immigration Removal Centre in the United Kingdom, he started a hunger strike on 26 August 2013. By mid-November he was expected to die if not released. An attempt was made to deport him on Friday 30 November, which failed when the plane was refused access to Nigerian airspace. The attempt is estimated to have cost the Home Office between £95,000 and £110,000. He was eventually removed from the UK on 17 December 2013.

A 2018 report found that Isa Muazu was living homeless in Algeria after he was forced to flee again from Boko Haram following his return to Nigeria in 2013.
