= Colnbrook Immigration Removal Centre =

Immigration detention facility near London Heathrow Airport

Coordinates: 51.4835°N 0.4830°W

Colnbrook Immigration Removal Centre is a British immigration detention facility that holds foreign nationals without permission to be in the United Kingdom prior to their deportation from the United Kingdom. It is located in Harmondsworth, London Borough of Hillingdon. Colnbrook, adjacent to Harmondsworth Immigration Removal Centre and London Heathrow Airport, houses only males. Colnbrook, which opened in August 2004, is built to Class B prison standards, making it one of the highest security immigration removal centres in the United Kingdom alongside Brook House. Colnbrook has 308 bed spaces.

The building was officially opened by Des Browne, who was then Immigration Minister, in September 2004. The building's location is in the area planned for demolition as part of the expansion of Heathrow Airport.

The design of the centre is modelled on a high security, Category B criminal prison with wings running into a central area. Each cell is designed to hold two detainees. There is a toilet built into the cell.

The centre is operated by Mitie who also operate Harmondsworth Immigration Removal Centre .

Colnbrook detains people who are due for removal from the UK due to inadequate right to enter or to remain in the United Kingdom and this may include foreign-national prisoners who have completed their sentences in UK prisons and who are detained pending removal from the country.

The centre offers detainees a range of activities whilst they are waiting for deportation including a library, multi-faith worship facilities, education provision, gym and sports activities, and a shop.

== See also ==
- Immigration detention in the United Kingdom
- Modern immigration to the United Kingdom
