= Tinsley House Immigration Removal Centre =

Immigration detention centre in England

Coordinates: 51.1457°N 0.1773°W

Tinsley House Immigration Removal Centre is a United Kingdom Immigration Removal Centre (IRC), where individuals are held while awaiting decisions on their asylum claim or considered for deportation from the UK for various reasons. It is located on Perimeter Road South of Gatwick Airport in Gatwick, West Sussex, England. Tinsley House is managed by security firm Serco on behalf of Border Force. When Tinsley House was established in 1996, it was the UK's first purpose-built detention centre. Since then, the UK's detention estate has expanded substantially and there are now nine immigration removal centres. Some individuals are also detained in short-term holding facilities and prisons.

Tinsley House has bed spaces for 119 males and eight units for families. The family wings have access to outdoor children's play area, small kitchenette and childcare. The centre has a well-stocked library, a computer room, English language and arts and crafts access, television rooms, chapel and prayer rooms. It includes a sports hall and field with equipment for detainees to play football and volleyball and also well-equipped gym. The visiting times are 14:00 to 21:00 every day.

== See also ==
- Brook House Immigration Removal Centre
- Immigration detention in the United Kingdom
