= Immigration Enforcement =

UK law enforcement agency

Agency overview
- Formed: 1 April 2012
- Preceding agency: UK Border Agency

Jurisdictional structure
- Operations jurisdiction: United Kingdom
- Specialist jurisdiction: Immigration

Operational structure
- Elected officer responsible: Anna Turley, Minister of State for Border Security and Asylum
- Agency executive: Basit Javid, director general
- Parent agency: Home Office

Website
- gov.uk/government/organisations/immigration-enforcement/

Immigration Enforcement (IE) is a law enforcement command within the Home Office, responsible for enforcing immigration law across the United Kingdom. The force was part of the now defunct UK Border Agency from its establishment in 2008 until Home Secretary Theresa May demerged it in March 2012 after severe criticism of the senior management. Immigration Enforcement was formed on 1 March 2012, becoming accountable directly to ministers.

The force's responsibilities include preventing abuse, tracking immigration offenders and increasing compliance with immigration law. Its officers are warranted as immigration officers, holding various powers of arrest and detention. Officers work in the UK and overseas, including inland and at air and sea ports, often in partnership with Border Force.

The work of Immigration Enforcement is monitored by the Independent Chief Inspector of Borders and Immigration.

== History ==
Former Home Secretary Theresa May announced the abolition of the UK Border Agency on 26 March 2013, with the intention that its work would be returned to the Home Office. The agency's executive agency status was removed and internally it was split into two, with one division responsible for the visa system and other for immigration law enforcement. This was eventually split further into Border Force and Immigration Enforcement, with the two agencies forming two separate commands within the Home Office.

== Departments ==
Immigration Enforcement has a number of internal departments, including Criminal & Financial Investigation (CFI) which is a non-uniformed, investigatory unit much like the Criminal Investigation Department within territorial police forces, responsible for investigating criminality surrounding immigration, such as the production of false documents. IE also has its own Intelligence Department, which is responsible for gathering and disseminating information, as well as other functions. Immigration Enforcement has signed up to the Professionalising Investigations Programme (PIP).

The organisation works closely with other bodies including the police, National Crime Agency, Border Force, UK Visas and Immigration, and the National Document Fraud Unit.

=== Immigration Compliance and Enforcement (ICE) ===
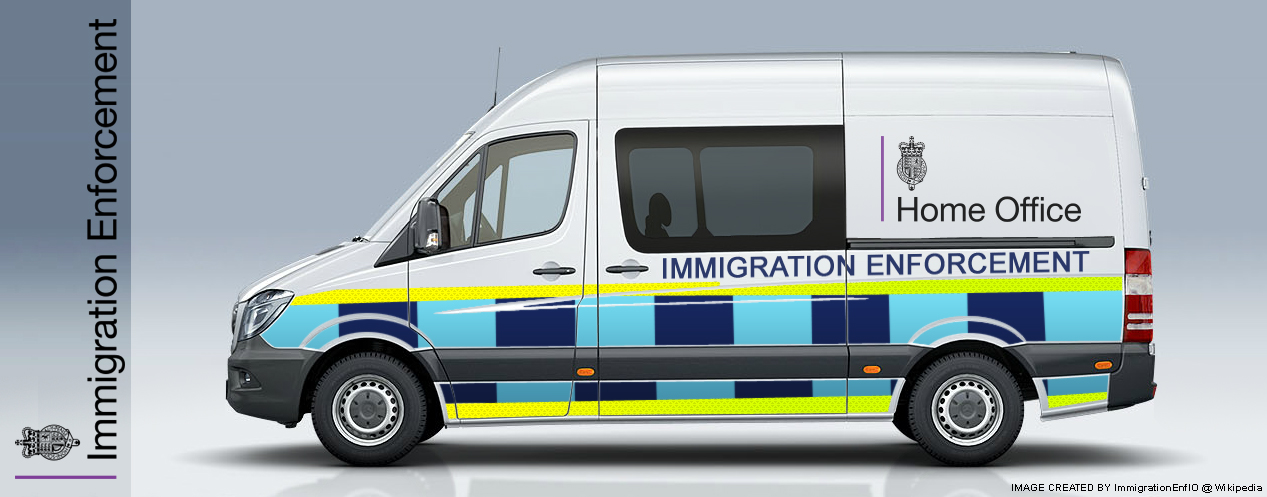
A marked Immigration Compliance Enforcement Mercedes cell van. These are used to transport officers and detainees to/from locations in the UK

ICE teams ensure compliance with immigration laws and carry out enforcement where necessary, including tracking down illegal migrants and targeting companies employing workers illegally.

Officers utilise their powers to execute warrants, identify offenders and take them into custody to facilitate their removal from the UK. The majority of raids target commercial premises, where workers can be employed illegally holding no status in the UK. As such, companies found to be employing workers illegally are referred to the CFI and other agencies.

There are 19 ICE teams across the UK.

=== Criminal and Financial Investigation (CFI) ===
The primary role of the unit is to investigate and disrupt serious organised crime groups who are seeking to undermine the UK's immigration controls at the border and inland via various criminal means. These teams are regionally based and are made up of immigration officers and seconded police officers who work in joint investigation teams as part of the Home Office.

CFI Teams originally started in the UK Border Agency as the agency's own investigation teams, covering both immigration investigations and customs investigations, mainly drug seizures, that were not undertaken by the National Crime Agency.

Criminal and Financial Investigations (CFI) teams focus on investigating eight main categories of crime which support other work streams. Those categories include:

1. Trafficking in human beings (THB) and Modern Slavery Act 2015 offences, this could be trafficking for:
  - sexual exploitation
  - organ harvesting
  - forced labour
  - other forms of involuntary servitude
2. Facilitation through:
  - lorry drops (clandestine entrants)
  - marriage abuse
  - college abuse
  - rogue employers
  - producing or supplying counterfeit or forged documents
  - other means
3. Cash seizures of over £1,000 referred from Immigration Compliance and Enforcement (ICE) teams and others, under the Proceeds of Crime Act 2002.

Officers in CFI, who have the same arrest powers as a police constable under Section 24 of the Police and Criminal Evidence Act, are required to pass the Immigration Enforcement Investigators Exam, similar to the National Investigators Exam in policing but which has been amended to remove some of the policing syllabus and additionally test immigration knowledge, before completing the Initial Crime Investigators Development Programme (ICIDP) [PIP 2]. Once officers have completed their portfolio, they are added to the IE criminal investigators register.

== Defunct Units ==
=== Rapid Response Team (RRT) ===
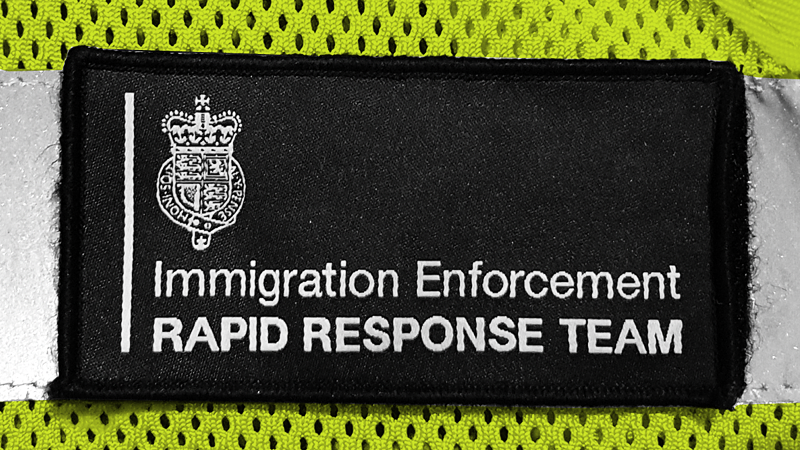
RRT officers wear a specially modified patch on their uniform to distinguish them from other departments, signifying their additional skills and training.

The RRT was originally set up as a temporary role in 2019 (officers seconded from ICE teams) but was made a substantive department in August 2020 - the team is a nationwide taskforce (covering the whole of the UK) and has no physical office. The team was established to provide IE with a mobile taskforce that was capable of responding to a wide array of incidents and taskings, with a large focus placed on counter-terrorism and detecting immigration offences that would otherwise go unnoticed.

This is a multi-function team of specialist immigration officers that have received additional training and can be sent on a multitude of deployments, including:

- seaport deployments to assist Border Force and police with landing foot/car passengers and checking freight
- airport taskings to assist Border Force and police with security/counter-terrorism operations
- urgent response to critical incidents
- assisting with police / NCA-led operations
- bolstering ICE and CFI teams on residential / business visits
- conducting street operations to intercept high-harm offenders
- executing maritime operations at unmanned small ports
- deploying on cutters / coastal patrol vessels and patrolling the coastline

Officers can be deployed at a moments notice and have been frequently seen in Dover during the "Small Boats Crisis" of 2020/21, alongside the permanently deployed CORT team (see below).

RRT has a PIP1 capacity, allowing the team to prosecute for low-level immigration offences (e.g. entering in breach of a deportation order, possession of false identity documents, etc).

Officers are generally recruited to the RRT from local ICE teams, but can also be recruited from Border Force and other Home Office departments.

=== Clandestine Operational Response Team (CORT) ===
CORT was originally established in early 2020 in response to the increased arrival of small boats (RHIBs) that were setting off from France to the UK, through the English Channel. This team was directly responsible for the operations at both Western Jetfoil in Dover and Manston arrivals and processing centre. Previously, it was also based at Tug Haven but this site closed in January 2022. The team was in charge of processing arrivals, conducting basic checks and arranging for migrants to be transported onwards. CORT also responded to reports of beach landings around the southeast coast, working with Kent Police to intercept those who had landed and fled. In fulfilling their frontline duties, CORT officers received assistance from other areas of Immigration Enforcement, such as Crime and Financial Investigation.

The team was in direct command of all the Border Force and Immigration Enforcement officers deployed to assist them; the Clandestine Threat Command (CTC) was the parent department that was responsible for deploying CORT and other teams such as RRT, GA/GM and ICE.

CORT was disbanded in January 2023 when Border Force took full command of the Small Boats Crisis - the team was replaced with the Small Boats Operational Command (SBOC) which falls under Border Force branding, as there is no longer any Immigration Enforcement involvement.

== Powers ==
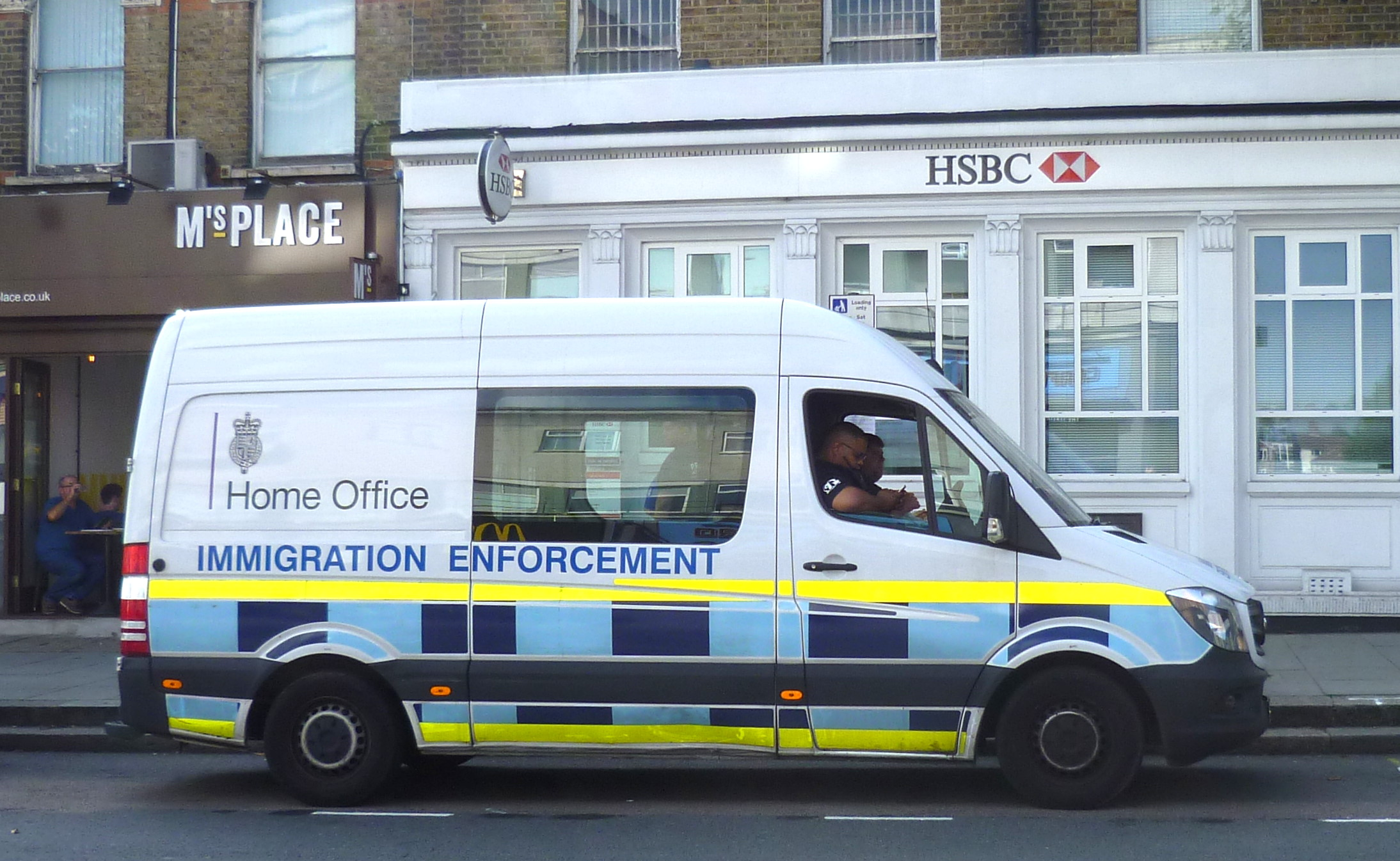
An Immigration Enforcement vehicle in London

Arrest officers are warranted and derive the majority of their powers from the Immigration Act 1971, although some powers are acquired from the Immigration and Asylum Act 1999 and the UK Borders Act 2007, as well as others.

In the vast majority of cases, Immigration Officers will use "administrative powers" under Schedule 2 of the Immigration Act 1971. Said powers include the execution of warrants and the power of arrest, as well as powers to search arrested persons and to search premises for evidence relating to a person's immigration status (passports, visas or plane tickets). These powers are used to start a process of "removing" a person administratively - this is often confused with "deportation", which is a different process entirely. Once an IO has arrested a subject, they must seek authority to detain them and serve paperwork upon them. If and when this is granted, the authority must then be sought to remove the subject back to their country of origin, possibly through an EU nation or via another transit point. This process ensures that no single officer can remove an individual from the United Kingdom without question - the arresting IO must explain and account for their actions before a CIO / HMI will approve detention and removal. In the event of a senior officer making an arrest, he/she must still obtain authority from another senior officer to detain and serve paperwork.

Others include "28" powers (sections 28A, 28B, 28C, etc.) of the Immigration Act 1971, which are similar to those in Schedule 2, but are criminal powers and not administrative. These are rarely used by standard arrest officers, but still form a large part of an IO's powers. These powers are more likely to be used in cases of "high harm" offenders (individuals involved in criminality) and other cases where a subject is likely to face prosecution (repeat offenders, use of forged documents, etc.).

It is an offence to obstruct or assault an IO. Officers can arrest anyone (including British nationals and EU citizens) if they suspect them of committing such an offence. The powers of arrest are contained within Section 28A(5) of the Immigration Act 1971 and Section 23(1) of the UK Borders Act 2007 respectively.

Since 2013, CFI officers were designated with additional powers to a typical Immigration Officer. These were introduced to increase accountability, and reduce confusion during multi-agency working. These powers were added under Police and Criminal Evidence Order (Application to Immigration Officers) 2013. These powers can only be executed for criminal investigations, and by specially trained and designated officers. The PACE order 2013 affords Criminal Investigators the same powers as a constable in relation to arrest, entry and search.

== Uniform and rank insignia ==
Uniformed immigration officers have their rank displayed on shoulder epaulettes, attached to their wicking shirt, jumper, jacket and stab vest. Officers below HM inspector rank will usually have their warrant/identification number displayed.

Officers possess a warrant card with a crest/badge (akin to police officers), which they may sometimes display in their uniform or plain clothes, if for instance, conducting a raid.

The uniform of ICE officers who conduct raids and arrest persons is all dark blue or black. It is informal and operational, but ICE officers always have "immigration enforcement" in capital letters written on their garments.

The uniform includes:

- t-shirt
- cargo trousers
- jumper/jacket
- stab vest
- equipment vest (black or yellow)
- boots
- baseball cap

The rank structure adopted within Home Office Immigration Enforcement is as follows:

Immigration Enforcement Ranks
Rank	Director General	Director	Deputy Director	Grade 6	Grade 7	His Majesty's Inspector	Chief Immigration Officer	Immigration Officer	Assistant Immigration Officer	Administrative Assistant
Epaulette Insignia										

There are equivalent grades that mirror the rest of the Civil Service.

The PACE order 2013 introduced that a chief immigration officer is the equivalent to a police inspector in relation to lawful authorities. A CIO is also a designated senior officer under the Proceeds of Crime Act 2002.

As far as legislation is concerned, there is no difference between an assistant immigration officer and an immigration officer. The Home Office has introduced procedural differences. There are differences between the two ranks within Border Force, as only an immigration officer has the power to authorise a person's entry to the United Kingdom.

== Political issues, confrontations and controversy ==
In 2014, a number of Immigration Enforcement intelligence documents forming part of the "Operation Centurion" campaign were leaked to campaign groups and the media. The information revealed caused controversy, particularly as they gave the impression that operations were widely based on "racial profiling" targeting particular ethnic groups. The then chairman of the House of Commons Home Affairs Committee, Keith Vaz MP, stated that "judging by what I've heard from this document it seems very clear that this is not based on intelligence, but they refer to particular nationalities and particular industries that they are involved in".

A report published in August 2016 by Corporate Watch highlighted a number of areas of controversy surrounding Immigration Enforcement operations against "illegal working". The main points included:

- Racial bias. Workplace raids are massively skewed towards certain ethnic groups; people from India, Pakistan and Bangladesh account for 75% of all those arrested.
- "Low grade" intelligence. While claiming to be "intelligence-led", the majority of operations are based on "low grade" tip-offs from "members of the public", classified as "uncorroborated" information from "untested sources" in the official intelligence rating system.
- Entry without warrants. In the majority of raids, Immigration Enforcement teams do not in fact have court-issued warrants. A sample carried out by the Independent Chief Inspector of Borders and Immigration in December 2015 found that teams had warrants in only 43% of cases. In many other raids, Immigration Officers claimed they had "informed consent" to enter the premises. But the Inspector noted numerous irregularities in Immigration Officers' understanding of "consent", and that there was no record keeping to actually demonstrate whether or how consent had been given.
- Independent Chief Inspector's criticisms. An earlier 2014 report by the Independent Chief Inspector of Borders and Immigration strongly criticised Immigration Enforcement for entering premises without warrants, including doing so unlawfully, and widely abusing the system of "Assistant Directors' Letters" to enter without due legal process.
- Abuse of "consensual questioning". The independent chief inspector found that, contrary to legal guidance, raid teams routinely round up and interrogate everyone on premises, whether or not they are a named suspect. They are only supposed to ask "consensual questions" of people who are not named suspects. However, according to the Inspector, "In the 184 files we sampled, there was no record of anyone being 'invited' to answer 'consensual questions'. The files showed that officers typically gathered everyone on the premises together, regardless of the information known or people's actions."

The Corporate Watch report followed the high profile "Byron Burgers Case", where the hamburger restaurant chain collaborated with Immigration Enforcement to set up a "sting operation", calling in workers for early morning meetings where they were met by Immigration Enforcement arrest teams. The Corporate Watch report found that this case was part of a wider pattern in which "Immigration Officers seek to follow up tip-offs by contacting employers and asking them to collaborate ahead of raids. This collaboration may include: handing over staff lists; handing over personal details including home addresses, which are then raided; helping arrange "arrests by appointment", as in Byron's case and also mentioned in the leaked "Operation Centurion" files."

Immigration is a very political issue within the United Kingdom; a Statista-backed survey revealed that 50 percent of respondents believed immigration to be the biggest issue the UK is facing as of January 2026, which has put Immigration Enforcement at the forefront of issues surrounding migration, refugees and those opposed to immigration law. Many groups, such as the "No Border network" and "Anti Raids" are vehemently opposed to the organisation and the way it operates. In some instances, IOs have had their vehicles damaged, with tyres slashed and windows broken. An instance of this was an attack on IOs in Shadwell, East London in September 2015. Whilst IOs conducted a visit to a shop in the area, a number of people attacked their vehicles, resulting in damage to a number of vans and an unmarked car.

=== Public Accounts Committee report ===
In September 2020, the Public Accounts Committee published a report that was highly critical of the IE. The committee found that Home Office had "no idea" what the IE unit had achieved since being established. The committee also found that officials were reliant on "disturbingly weak evidence" when assessing the efficacy of immigration enforcement policies. The report warned that there was a risk that the IE's policy decision were based purely on "assumption and prejudice" and concluded that a lack of diversity among senior management risked a repeat of the Windrush scandal.
