= Manston =

Manston is the name of a number of settlements in England:

- Manston, Dorset
- Manston, Kent
  - location of the former RAF Manston airfield, Manston Airport and the Manston arrivals and processing centre
- Manston, Leeds
