= His Majesty's Chief Inspector =

Head of a British Inspectorate

In the United Kingdom, His Majesty's Chief Inspector (formerly Her Majesty's Chief Inspector), or simply HM Chief Inspector, is the head of an inspectorate. They are often appointed from outside the organisation over which they have oversight.

== List of chief inspectors ==
Chief inspector	Organisation	Year position created	Incumbent	Start date
Chief Inspector of Criminal Justice in Northern Ireland	Criminal Justice Inspection Northern Ireland	2003	Jacqui Durkin	30 November 2019
Chief Nuclear Inspector	Office for Nuclear Regulation	2013	Mark Foy	2017
Chief Planning Inspector	Planning Inspectorate		Richard Schofield	May 2022
HM Chief Inspector of Constabulary and Fire & Rescue Services (England and Wales)	HM Inspectorate of Constabulary and Fire & Rescue Services	1856	Andy Cooke	1 April 2022
HM Chief Inspector of Constabulary in Scotland	HM Inspectorate of Constabulary in Scotland	1857	Gill Imery	April 2018
HM Chief Inspector of Crown Premises Fire Safety	Crown Premises Fire Safety Inspectorate		Peter Holland	28 January 2013
HM Chief Inspector of Drinking Water	Drinking Water Inspectorate	1990	Marcus Rink	22 July 2015
HM Chief Inspector of Education and Training in Wales	Estyn	1907	Owen Evans	January 2022
HM Chief Inspector of Education, Children's Services and Skills (England)	Ofsted	1992	Martyn Oliver	1 January 2024
HM Chief Inspector of Fire Services (Scotland)	His Majesty's Fire Service Inspectorate for Scotland	2005	Martyn Emberson	January 2016
HM Chief Inspector of Mines	Health and Safety Executive	1908	Dan Mitchell	20 January 2020
HM Chief Inspector of Prisons (England and Wales)	HM Inspectorate of Prisons	1981	Charlie Taylor	November 2020
HM Chief Inspector of Prisons in Scotland	HM Inspectorate of Prisons for Scotland	1979	David Strang	June 2013
HM Chief Inspector of Probation	HM Inspectorate of Probation	1936	Dame Glenys Stacey	March 2016
HM Chief Inspector of Railways	His Majesty's Railway Inspectorate	1840	Richard Hines	June 2024
HM Chief Inspector of the Crown Prosecution Service (England and Wales)	His Majesty's Crown Prosecution Service Inspectorate	1986	Anthony Rogers	31 January 2025
Independent Chief Inspector of Borders and Immigration	Independent (reports to Home Office)	2007	David Bolt	3 June 2024

=== Dissolved appointments ===
Chief inspector	Years active	Final incumbent
HM Senior Chief Inspector of Education (Scotland)	1840 to 2011	Bill Maxwell
HM Chief Inspector of Nuclear Installations	1959 to 2013	Mike Weightman
