= Defence Fire Training and Development Centre =

- Near Manston, Kent in England
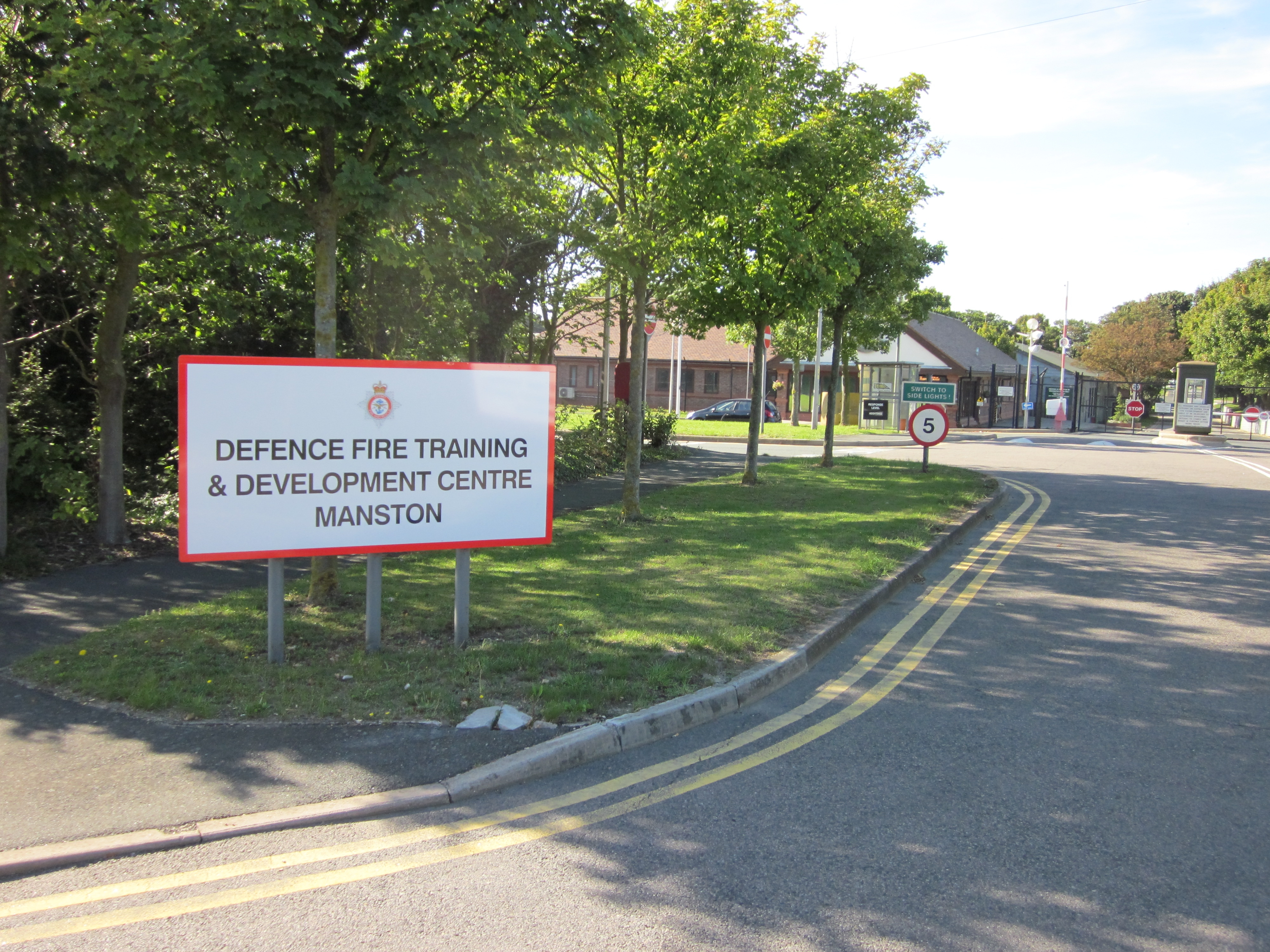
- The entrance to the Defence Fire Training and Development Centre

Site information
- Type: Defence Training Establishment
- Owner: Ministry of Defence
- Operator: Royal Air Force (1959–2007); British Army (2007–2020)
- Condition: Closed
- Website: Official website

Location
- Location in Kent
- Coordinates: 51.348°N 1.350°E
- Area: 39 hectares (96 acres)

Site history
- Built: 1959 (as the Air Ministry Fire Training School)
- In use: 1959–2020

The Defence Fire Training and Development Centre (DFTDC, formerly FSCTE Manston) was the site of the Ministry of Defence's firefighter training. It occupied part of a former Royal Air Force base near the village of Manston in the southeast corner of England. The remainder of the former RAF Manston was part of Kent International Airport, a civilian airfield, until the site was closed on the 15 May 2014. Since 2022, the site is now used for the Manston arrivals and processing centre.

== History ==
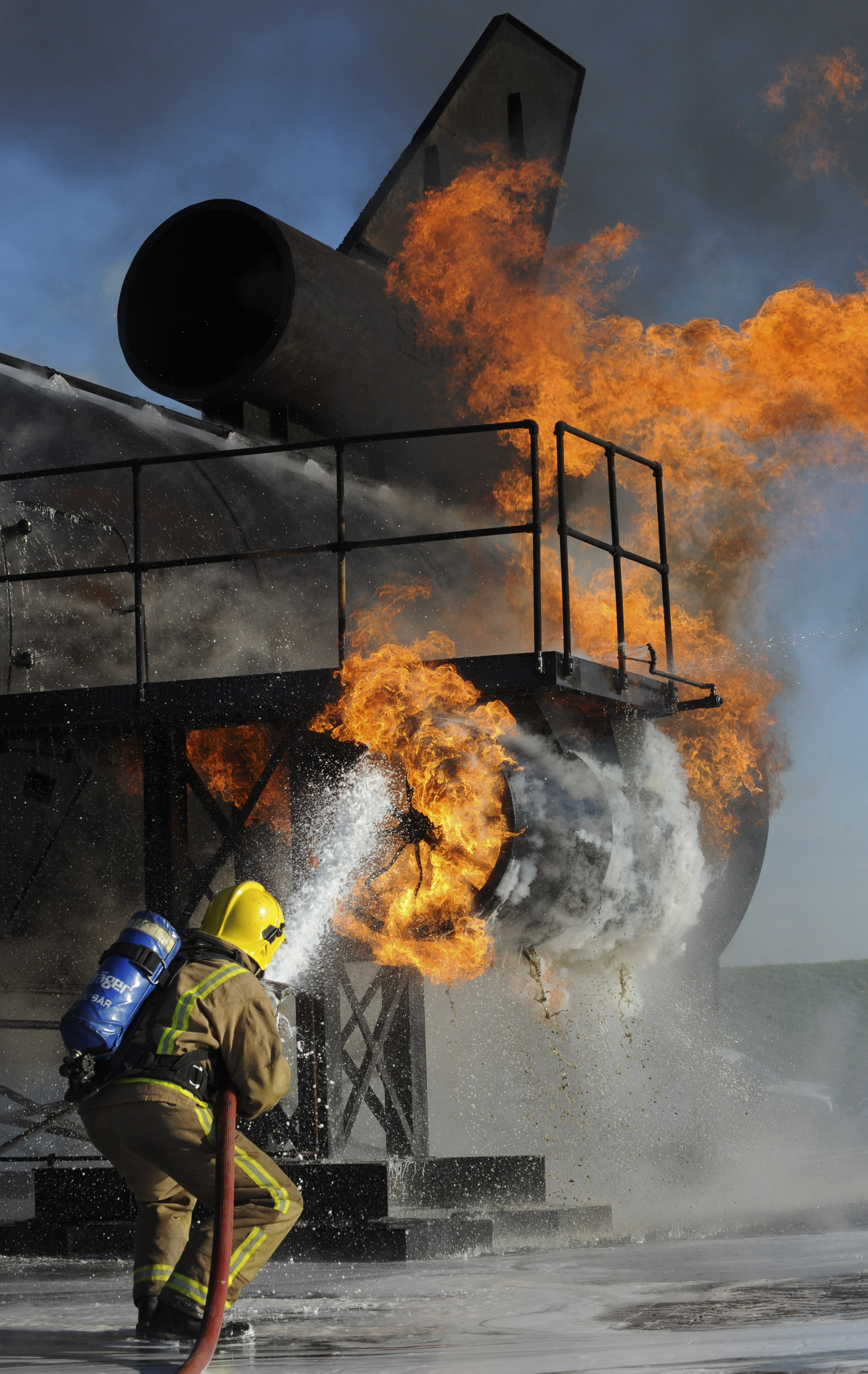
RAF firefighter on the multi-simulator training unit at DFTDC

On 1 January 1989 the RAF consolidated the RAF Fire Fighting and Rescue Squadron from RAF Catterick to Manston along with the Air Force Department Fire Service School, Manston, forming the RAF Fire Services Central Training Establishment (CTE). In 1995, the station was chosen to be the central training facility for all MOD firefighter training operations, and became MOD FSCTE.

On 31 March 1999, the remainder of RAF Manston closed, leaving FSCTE as the sole occupant of the previous domestic side of the base. The airside part of the base was signed over to the existing commercial operator to form Kent International Airport. In April 2007 the Army assumed responsibility for firefighting throughout the British armed forces, with the creation of the Defence Fire Risk Management Organisation (DFRMO) at Andover. This led to the transfer of FSCTE from RAF Strike Command at RAF High Wycombe to HQ Land Forces at Wilton (now Andover), controlled locally by HQ 2 Brigade at Shorncliffe Barracks, Folkestone.

On 22 October 2020, the final class of RAF fire fighters graduated at FSCTE before training moved to the Fire Service College, ending the RAF's 104 years association with Manston. Reservists from 3rd Battalion the Princess of Wales's Royal Regiment and an Air Cadet Squadron will remain on-site.

== Manston Fire Museum ==
Inside the base, the old RAF CTE building was a museum of firefighting, especially as it related to the RAF, called the Manston Fire Museum. This started as the private collection of Flt Sgt Steve Shirley; when he was posted to Manston the RAF agreed to take it over and it opened as the Ministry of Defence Fire Museum in June 1995. It was renamed the Manston Fire Museum in November 1998. The collection included vehicles, models, badges, patches, uniforms, helmets, prints, extinguishers and fire fighting equipment. The museum closed in 2014 and the collections were transferred to the Museum of RAF Firefighting at Scampton.

== Manston Asylum Processing Centre ==
From February 2022, buildings and temporary structures located on the former DFTDC Manston site were used as a processing centre for people who had reached the UK in small boats. Officially referred to by the Home Office as the Manston Asylum Processing Centre migrants were meant to be held at the facility for no more than 24 hours while undergoing security and identity checks.

In autumn 2022, the site was accommodating 4,000 people, more than twice as many as its maximum capacity of 1,600. Many migrants were placed in tents. Overcrowding at the centre led to an outbreak of scabies and diphtheria. In November 2022, a Kurdish asylum seeker, who had been processed at the centre, died in hospital after contracting diphtheria.

In October 2022, Chief Inspector of Borders and Immigration, David Neal, visited the centre and described the conditions as "wretched". During the visit, Neal met an Afghan family who had been accommodated at the centre in a marquee for more than a month.

In May 2024, the Home Office agreed to statutory inquiry into alleged assaults and mistreatment of asylum seekers at the centre.

In September 2024, the new home secretary, Yvette Cooper, decided to downgrade the inquiry to an independent inquiry citing financial costs. A legal challenge against this decision is being made in the High Court in November 2024, in which documents revealed that more than 60% of people processed between June and November 2022 were detained for longer than 24 hours. This may result in compensation having to be paid.

== See also ==
- Defence Fire and Rescue Service
