= Laurence Williams (nuclear engineer) =

British nuclear engineer

Professor Laurence Williams OBE FREng FIMechE FLSW
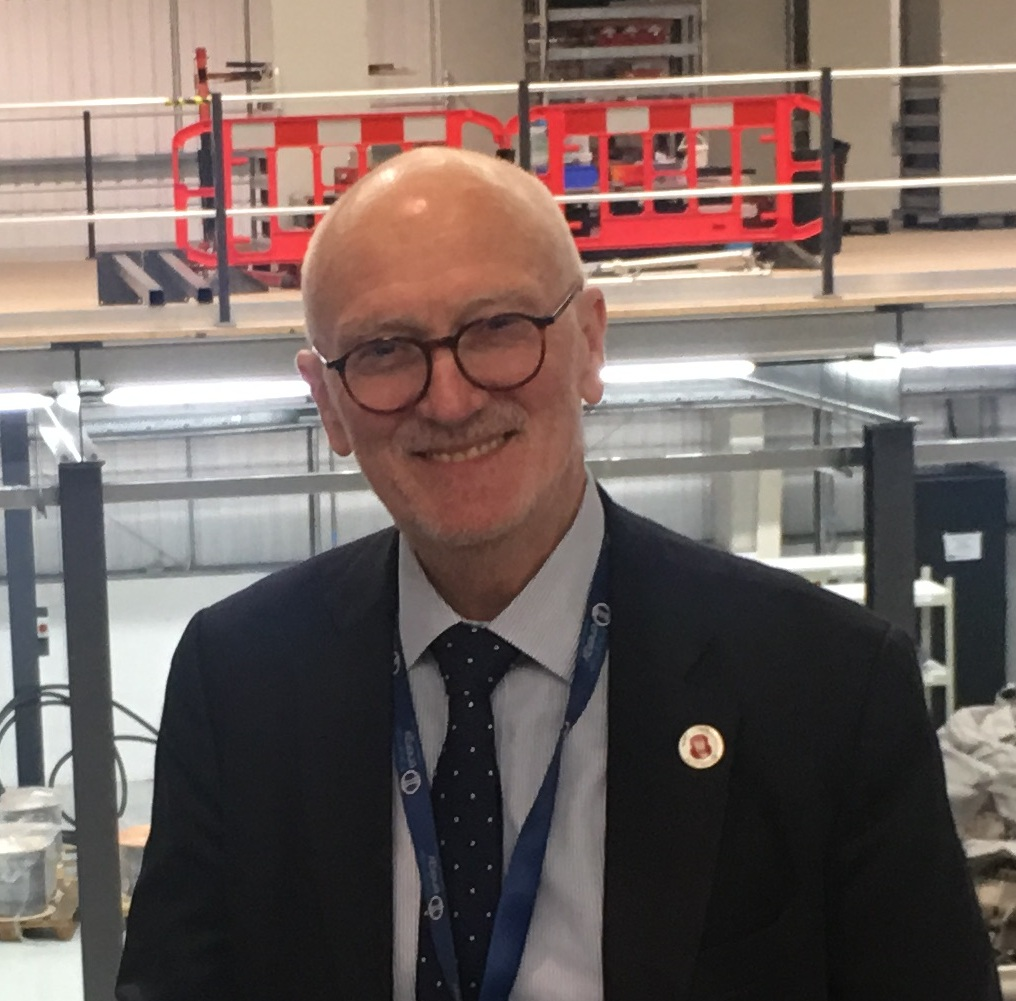

HM Chief Inspector of Nuclear Installations
- In office 1998–2005
- Succeeded by: Mike Weightman

Personal details
- Born: Laurence Glynn Williams; 14 March 1946 (age 80)
- Citizenship: United Kingdom
- Spouse: Lorna Susan Rance (m. 1976–1997)
- Children: Two
- Education: Liverpool Polytechnic; Aston University

Laurence Glynn Williams, OBE, FREng, FIMechE, FNucl, FLSW (born 14 March 1946) is a British nuclear engineer, health and safety expert, and academic. He specialises in nuclear safety and security. From 1998 to 2005, he was Her Majesty's Chief Inspector of Nuclear Installations. From 2010 to 2014, he was Professor of Nuclear Safety and Regulation at the University of Central Lancashire. He has served as Chairman of the Committee on Radioactive Waste Management in the Department of Energy and Climate Change since 2012, and Chairman of the Defence Nuclear Safety Committee in the Ministry of Defence since 2013. He has been described as "one of the world's leading experts in nuclear safety regulation".

== Early life and education ==
Williams was born on 14 March 1946 to Hugh Williams and Ruby Williams (née Lawrence). He studied mechanical engineering at Liverpool Polytechnic, graduating with a Bachelor of Science (BSc) degree. He later undertook postgraduate studies in nuclear reactor technology at Aston University, and graduated with a Master of Science (MSc) degree in 1972.

== Career ==
From 1970 to 1971, Williams was a design engineer with the Nuclear Power Group and worked on high temperature reactors. From 1973 to 1976, he worked as a nuclear engineer with the Central Electricity Generating Board (CEGB). His work included modelling nuclear flasks, the containers in which active nuclear materials are transported, and investigating the thermal performance of nuclear fuel. During this time, he trained towards registration and qualified as a Chartered Engineer (CEng) in 1976.

Having spent the first six years of his career working as an engineer, in 1976 Williams moved into health and safety. From 1976, he was an inspector with the Nuclear Installations Inspectorate (part of the Health and Safety Executive (HSE)). He was promoted to principal inspector in 1978 and superintending inspector in 1986. From 1991 to 1996, he was Deputy Chief Inspector of the Nuclear Installations Inspectorate. He then spent the next two years as a divisional head of the Safety Policy Directorate, HSE. From 1998 to 2005, he served as Her Majesty's Chief Inspector of Nuclear Installations. From 2005 to 2008, he was Director of Nuclear Safety, Security and Environment at the Nuclear Decommissioning Authority (NDA). Between 2007 and 2008, he was also the NDA's chief engineer. From 2008 to 2010, he worked as a consultant in nuclear safety and security.

In February 2010, it was announced that Williams had been appointed to the United Kingdom's first professorship in nuclear safety, and became Professor of Nuclear Safety and Regulation at the University of Central Lancashire later that year. He stepped down form the professorship in 2014 and was appointed emeritus professor. Since at least 2013, he has been a visiting professor in nuclear safety, security and regulation at King's College London. Since 2014, he has been a senior research fellow at Imperial College London.

Williams was Chairman of the International Nuclear Regulators Association between 2000 and 2002. He was a member of the Nuclear Safety Committee, Office for Nuclear Regulation from 2006 to 2013, and of the Civil Nuclear Police Authority from 2007 to 2008. Since 2011, he has served as UK member of the High Scientific Council of the European Nuclear Society. In November 2012, he was appointed Chairman of the Committee on Radioactive Waste Management in the Department of Energy and Climate Change; the appointment is for four years. In 2013, he was appointed Chairman of the Defence Nuclear Safety Committee in the Ministry of Defence.

== Personal life ==
In 1976, Williams married Lorna Susan Rance. Together they had two children; one son and one daughter. Williams and Lorna divorced in 1997.

== Honours ==
Williams was elected a Fellow of the Institution of Mechanical Engineers (FIMechE) in 1991. In 1998, he was elected a Fellow of the Institution of Nuclear Engineers (FINucE): the Institution merged with another body in 2009 to become the Nuclear Institute, and so he became a Fellow of the Nuclear Institute (FNucI). In 2004, he was elected a Fellow of the Royal Academy of Engineering (FREng), the UK's national academy of engineering. As part of the Queen's 2018 Birthday Honours List, Williams was awarded the title of OBE for services to Nuclear Safety and Radioactive Waste Management. In 2023, Williams was elected a Fellow of the Learned Society of Wales.
