= INRA =

INRA may refer to:

- Institut national de la recherche agronomique, the French agronomic research institution
- Instituto Nacional de Reforma Agraria, a Cuban agency formed to institute the Agrarian Reform Law of 1959
- International Nuclear Regulators' Association, an association of the most senior officials of the nuclear regulatory authorities
- Irish National Republican Army
