= Inspectorate =

Civil or military body

An inspectorate or inspectorate-general (or general inspectorate) is a civil or military body charged with inspecting and reporting on some institution or institutions in its field of competence. Inspectorates cover a broad spectrum of organizations which vary in a number of terms, notably whether and to the degree to which they become involved in criminal investigations; the extent to which they achieve independence from the institutions being inspected; as well as the nature of their inspection regimes and reporting processes.

Inspectorates are commonplace in government; for example, in the United States, there are some 73 standard form Offices of the Inspector General charged with examining the actions of a government agency, military organization, or military contractor as a general auditor of their operations and headed by an inspector general. Inspectorates in various jurisdictions oversee civil activities such as mining and the nuclear industry. Many regulatory agencies incorporate inspectorate functions relating to markets and the companies operating in those markets.

== Denmark ==
- Northern Inspectorate of Greenland
- Southern Inspectorate of Greenland

== Belgium ==
- Flemish Care Inspectorate

== The Netherlands ==
- Health Care Inspectorate

== United Kingdom ==
- His Majesty's chief inspector
- Active Travel England
- Independent Chief Inspector of Borders and Immigration
- His Majesty's Inspectorate of Constabulary
- His Majesty's Crown Prosecution Service Inspectorate
- Drinking Water Inspectorate
- Employment Agency Standards Inspectorate
- Fish Health Inspectorate
- His Majesty's Inspectorate of Mines
- Planning Inspectorate
- His Majesty's Chief Inspector of Education, Children's Services and Skills
- His Majesty's Chief Inspector of Prisons
- HM Inspectorate of Probation
- His Majesty's Railway Inspectorate – the safety arm of the Office of Rail Regulation since 2015

=== Scotland ===
- Care Inspectorate (Social Care and Social Work Improvement Scotland)
- His Majesty's Inspectorate of Constabulary in Scotland
- His Majesty's Inspectorate of Education in Scotland
- His Majesty's Chief Inspector of Prisons for Scotland

=== Wales ===
- Care Inspectorate Wales
- Healthcare Inspectorate Wales
- Chief Inspector of Education and Training in Wales

=== Northern Ireland ===
- Criminal Justice Inspection Northern Ireland
- Education and Training Inspectorate
- Regulation and Quality Improvement Authority

== United States ==
- Office of Inspector General

== Vietnam ==
- Government Inspectorate
