= Fellow of the Institution of Mechanical Engineers =

Fellow of the Institution of Mechanical Engineers (FIMechE)
- Location: London
- Website: www.imeche.org/membership-registration/become-a-member/fellow

Fellowship of the Institution of Mechanical Engineers (FIMechE) is an award and fellowship granted to individuals that the Institution of Mechanical Engineers judges to be a "professional engineer working in a senior role with significant autonomy and responsibility." It is the highest level of membership and demonstrates experience, commitment and contribution to engineering.

== Fellowship ==
Fellows are entitled to use the post-nominal letters FIMechE. As of 2016 examples of fellows include Colin P. Smith, Barry Thornton, William Pillar, Laurence Williams and Michael Alcock. See the Category:Fellows of the Institution of Mechanical Engineers for more examples.
