= Kent Intake Unit =

Migrant processing centre in Dover, UK

The Kent Intake Unit (KIU) is a facility located in Dover, led by the Home Office for the processing of migrants who have crossed the English Channel. The department describes the centre as a "short-term holding facility". In November 2022 it became a centre for processing unaccompanied child asylum seekers.

== History ==
In September 2020, Her Majesty's Inspectorate of Prisons (HMIP) visited a number of short-term immigration detention holding facilities; inspectors determined that KIU and Frontier House were not suitable for “very lengthy detentions”, but that some detainees had been held for over two days in rooms with no sleeping facilities, showers, or access to open air, leading to a high risk of spreading COVID-19. It found that children were held at the unit for an average of 17 hours, longer than the average for adults. One 15-year-old boy had been held for over 66 hours.

Following a visit by the Home Affairs Committee to the KIU on 27 July 2021, Yvette Cooper wrote a letter to Priti Patel to "raise serious concerns about the shocking conditions" found by MPs during the visit. She stated that "there were 56 people packed into [a] small waiting room", with "no ventilation, no social distancing and face masks are not worn". She further noted that despite 24 hours being the maximum limit for holding a person at the facility, some people had been kept there for "periods of up to 36 and 48 hours". The committee did not observe any COVID-19 mitigation measures. An unaccompanied child had been held in the facility for over 10 days.

KIU began to officially take in unaccompanied asylum-seeking children in November 2022, with facilities including softer interview rooms and an outside space being added as well as prayer rooms, a larger reception area and improved security.

In December 2022, the Independent Monitoring Board stated in a report into various Kent processing centres that among others, a 16-year-old girl had been admitted to the KIU with chemical burns on her legs, resulting from diesel on her clothes; she had been staying at the Tug Haven centre for two days wearing wet clothes that had become embedded into the burns. Another HMIP report, published in June 2023, stated that there had been improvements since previous inspections but that there continued to be issues with medical isolation practices, and found that a 17-year-old girl with a 10-month-old baby, who she said was conceived through rape, was held at the unit for almost 24 hours.

In July 2023, Conservative MP Robert Jenrick instructed KIU to remove murals of Mickey Mouse, Baloo and other cartoon characters which had been designed to welcome children to the reception centre. Staff initially resisted the order, but it was later carried out by outside contractors. A spokesperson confirmed that these murals were removed on 5 July. Jenrick initially stated that the murals should be removed as they were "too welcoming", though later said the murals were not "age appropriate" for teenage migrants. In April 2024, he stated that he regretted the move.

A report by the Independent Monitoring Board in October 2023 found that three Home Office processing centres for small boat arrivals, Manston arrivals and processing centre, Western Jet Foil and Kent Intake Unit, identified “serious concerns about the conditions in which people were being held”.

== See also ==
- Immigration detention in the United Kingdom
- English Channel migrant crossings (2018–present)
- Tug Haven
