= Ysgol Gyfun Gymunedol Penweddig =

Coordinates: 52.41°N 4.068°W

Location
- Ffordd Llanbadarn; Aberystwyth, SY23 3QN

Information
- Type: Secondary
- Established: 1973
- Head teacher: Clive Williams
- Gender: Mixed
- Age: 11 to 18
- Enrollment: 598 (2024)
- Language: Welsh
- Website: penweddig.ceredigion.sch.uk/en/

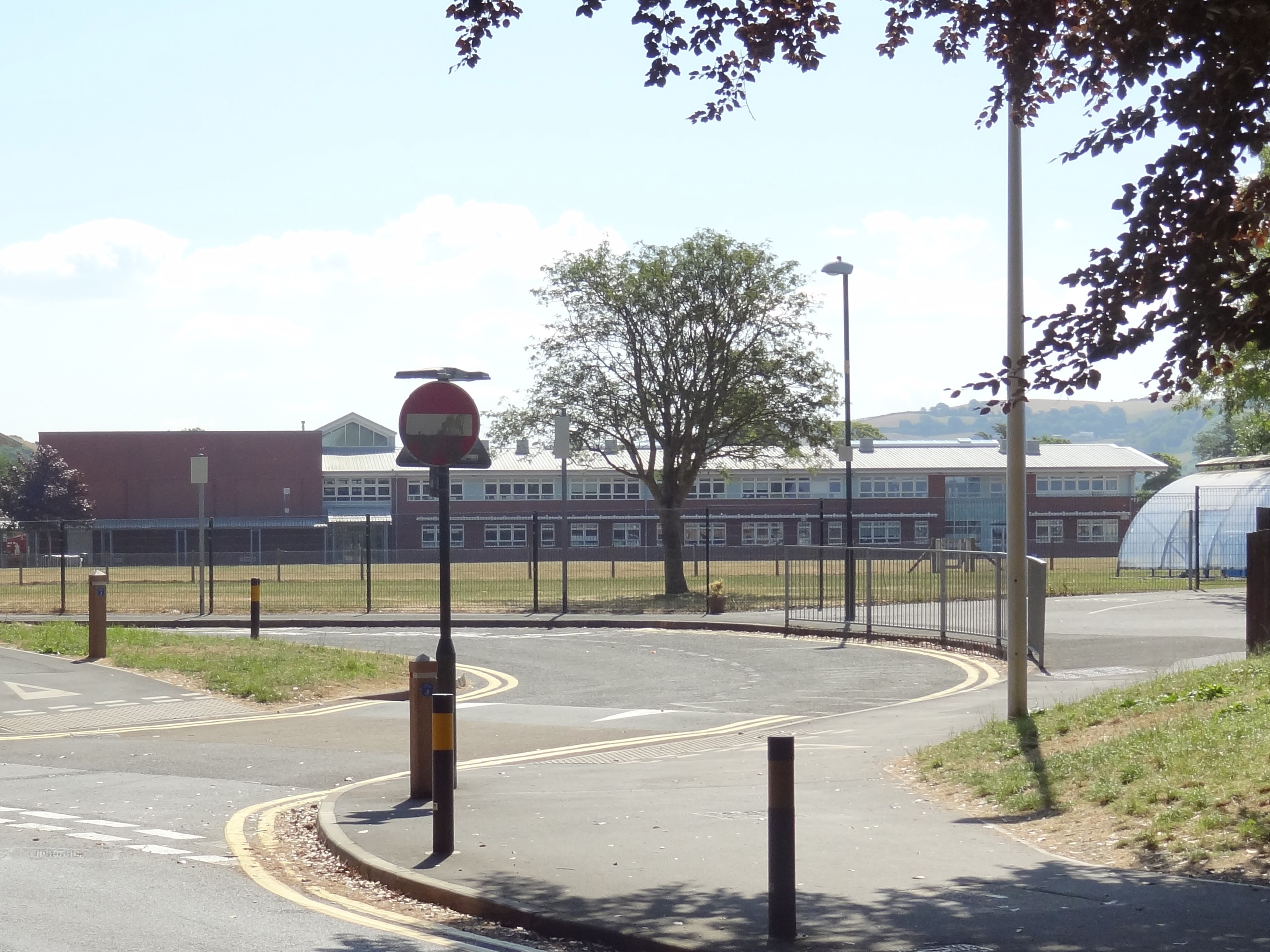
The school

Ysgol Gyfun Gymunedol Penweddig (Penweddig Community Comprehensive School in English) is a Welsh-language, community comprehensive school situated in Llanbadarn Fawr, Aberystwyth, Wales. The school was established in 1973. The school was the first Welsh language secondary school in Ceredigion and is named after the cantref of Penweddig, the northern part of the Kingdom of Ceredigion, between the rivers Dyfi and Ystwyth.

The school had 598 pupils on roll in 2024. In 2017, it was reported that Welsh was spoken at home by 69% of pupils, with all pupils being able to speak Welsh fluently. In 2024, 60.4% of statutory school age pupils spoke Welsh at home.

The school's building is owned by a private company who lease it to the school.

When the school was started in the mid-70s the school was housed in Ffordd Dewi, Aberystwyth. In October 2001, following a lengthy consultation with parents, staff and pupils, the school moved to its current home in Llanbadarn Road.

The current headteacher is Clive Williams.

== School council ==
The school council is formed before the autumn half term holidays, and meets regularly to discuss improvements to the school, be it physically or structurally. It comprises two representatives from every school year (one male; one female) elected by the whole of the respective year, and two permanent members representing the local youth service (also pupils). The council is mentored by the deputy headteacher.

== Notable alumni ==
- Owen Evans, chief executive of S4C
- Rhodri Davies, musician
- Huw Thomas, Welsh politician
- Aled Haydn Jones, head of BBC Radio 1
- Jacob Ifan, actor
- Gwyneth Keyworth, actress
- Georgia Ruth, singer-songwriter
- Angharad Davies, musician
