= Tug Haven =

Migrant processing facility in England

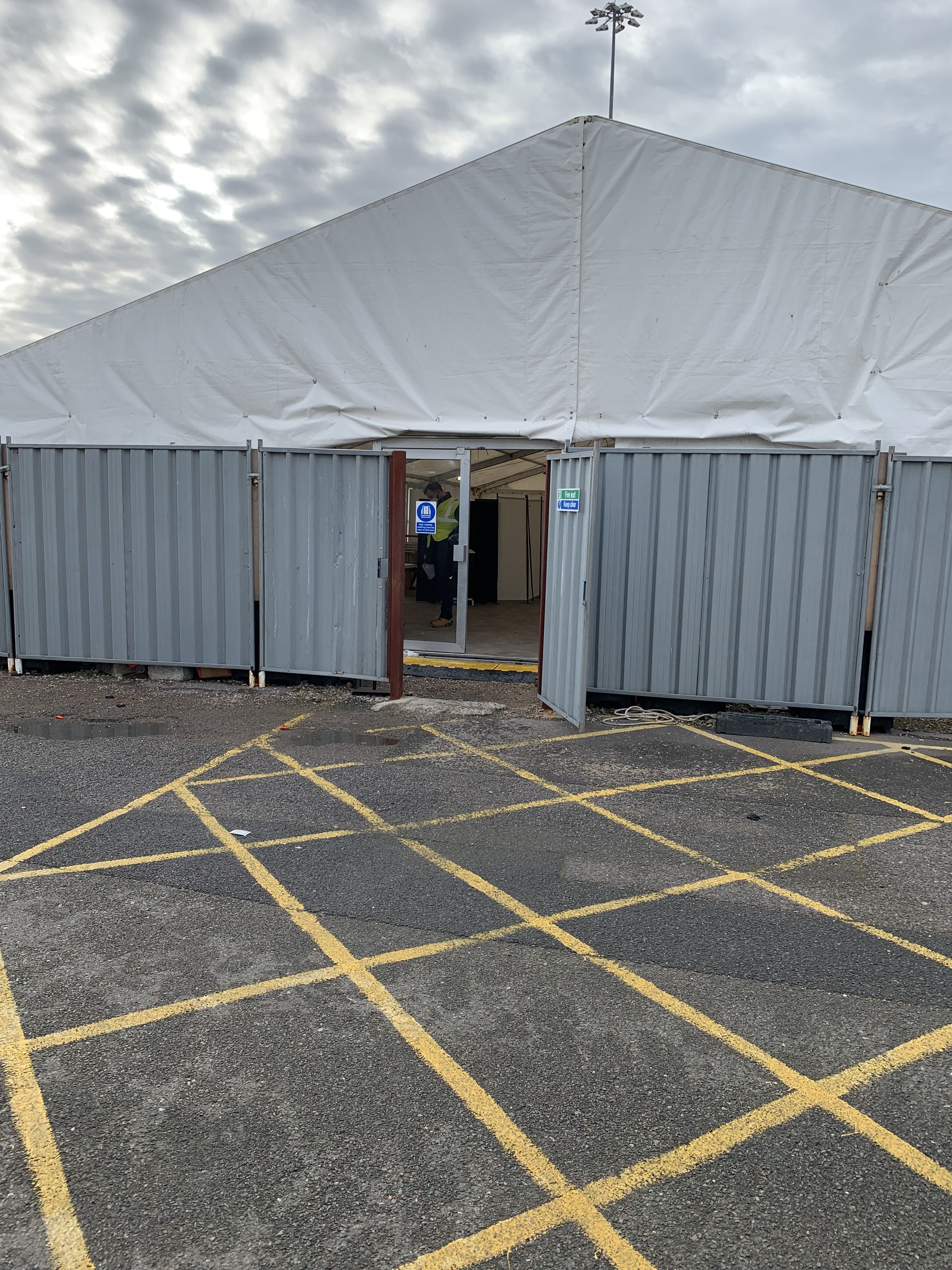
- Entrance, pictured in 2022
- Interactive map of Tug Haven
- Location: Dover, Kent, United Kingdom; 51.1162°N 1.3119°E
- Status: Closed
- Capacity: 200
- Opened: December 2018
- Closed: January 17, 2022

Tug Haven was a migrant processing facility located at the Port of Dover, south-east England. It operated from December 2018 until January 2022, serving as the initial reception point for migrants who had crossed the English Channel to reach the United Kingdom. Following critical reports about its conditions and operations, it was replaced by new facilities at Western Jet Foil and Manston arrivals and processing centre.

== History ==
As of October 2020, migrants were generally taken to two separate facilities in Dover after crossing the English Channel, one of which was Tug Haven. The facility was a fenced compound featuring several gazebos and three containers with chemical toilets. Migrants there largely hailed from Iran, Iraq, Sudan, Syria and Eritrea. Between June and August 2020, the facility received 2,500 migrants. Inspecting the site at this time, Chief Inspector of Prisons Peter Clarke stated that the facilities were "very poorly equipped to meet their purpose and important processes had broken down", that there were no means to reduce the risk of the spread of coronavirus, and that the site "resembled a rubble-strewn building site", but that the detainees felt they had been treated positively by the staff. The Home Office said that it had since improved the facility.

In October 2021, an Independent Monitoring Board (IMB) report stated that Tug Haven was not suitable for children or vulnerable people, with people initially held in tents, portacabins, and a double-decker bus. Later that month, The Independent reported that over the course of July, the Home Office had spent £6,757.52 at pizza chain Domino's in five separate transactions. The largest transaction, costing £1,824, stated that the purchase was to feed migrants who had already been held for 12 hours and were expected to be held for at least another full day, while the other transactions were to keep up with the large amount of asylum seekers who had arrived at the site but who had not eaten, and to feed migrants who were staying overnight.

Another report in December 2021 further concluded that the facilities were not fit for purpose, and that "despite some limited progress, detainees, including large numbers of unaccompanied children, continued (in 2021) to experience very poor treatment and conditions", finding that children, toddlers, babies and potentially vulnerable adults had all been held overnight, with families with small children spending over 24 hours in tents. One 16-year-old girl spent two days in wet clothes with burn injuries on her legs; these were not noticed until she was transferred to the Kent Intake Unit, likely causing life-long scars.

The facility closed on 17 January 2022, with operations transferred to the new Western Jet Foil site, located 50 metres away.

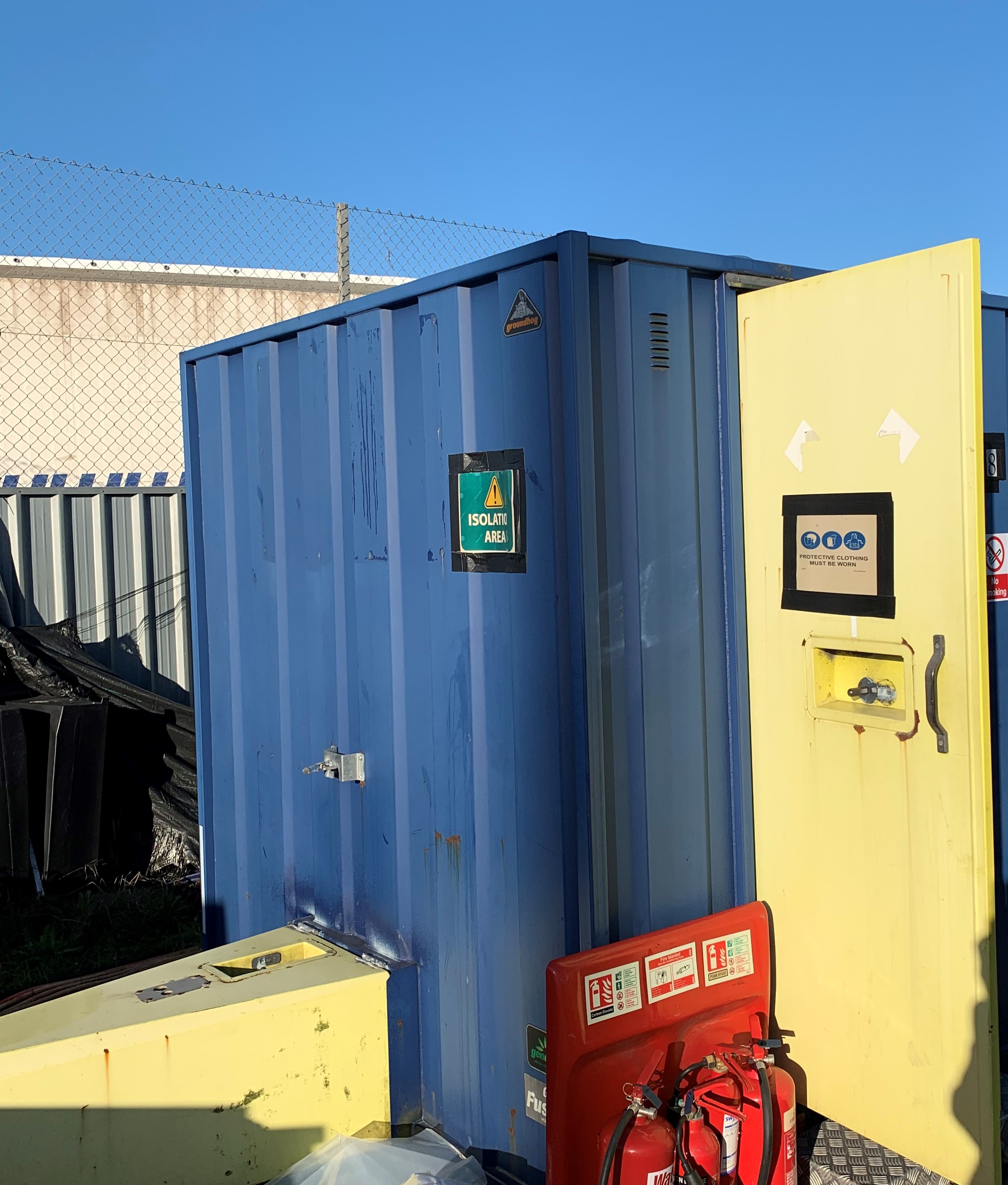
A shipping container used to isolate individuals testing positive for COVID-19

In July 2022, OpenDemocracy reported that the Home Office had pressured David Neal, an inspector of the site, to reword the foreword of his report into Tug Haven. The report stated that "effective safeguarding was sacrificed" and that staff had failed to record some arrivals, posing a security risk. He said that despite "significant experience of visiting detention facilities overseas," he had "never visited a detention facility in such a poor state." In his January 2022 visit he found that one person who tested positive for COVID-19 had been left to isolate in a shipping container for hours as it appeared staff had forgotten about him, and that 200 Vietnamese nationals who had arrived in small boats in 2021 had disappeared after being released into hotels with no support.

Another IMB report published in December 2022 described sleeping conditions as "extremely crowded", toilets as "extremely dirty" and noted a lack of showers and laundry facilities.

=== Illegal mobile phone seizures ===
A policy of seizing mobile phones at Tug Haven and demanding their passwords was ruled illegal by the High Court in 2022. The court found that the policy violated the claimants' rights under the European Convention on Human Rights and the Data Protection Act.

Between April and November 2020, nearly 2,000 phones were confiscated, some for up to ten months. Personal data, including emails and photos, was often unlawfully copied to a government intelligence database. The Immigration Law Practitioners’ Association told MPs the seizures hindered migrants' ability to communicate with lawyers, translators, and family members. At least 439 of the confiscated devices were "marked for destruction" after the Home Office was unable to identify their owners.

== See also ==
- Dover firebomb attack (at Western Jet Foil)
- English Channel migrant crossings (2018–present)
- Immigration detention in the United Kingdom
- Modern immigration to the United Kingdom
