= David Bolt (civil servant) =

Civil servant

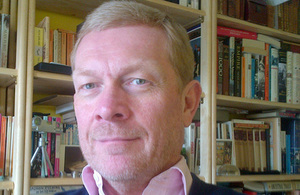

Independent Chief Inspector of Borders and Immigration
- In office Interim; 24 May 2024 – 2 October 2025
- Preceded by: David Neal
- Succeeded by: John Tuckett
- In office 1 May 2015 – 21 March 2021
- Preceded by: John Vine
- Succeeded by: David Neal

Personal details
- Education: University of East Anglia

David John Bolt CBE was the Independent Chief Inspector of Borders and Immigration between 1 May 2015 and 21 March 2021. He also held the role on an interim basis between 24 May 2024 and 2 October 2025.

He graduated from the University of East Anglia with a BA in comparative literature and Russian language in 1976. During his degree he spent time studying at Voronezh State University. A former MI5 officer, he previously held the positions of Deputy Director General of the National Criminal Intelligence Service, Executive Director of Intelligence at the Serious Organised Crime Agency, and Chief Executive of the International Federation of Spirits Producers. He was appointed Commander of the Order of the British Empire (CBE) in the 2025 Birthday Honours.

In June 2025, Bolt told a Justice and Home Affairs Committee that he did not believe the government's plan to end the use of asylum hotels by the next election would be achieved. He also express skepticism about the government's ability to "smash the gangs" involved in channel migrant crossings, noting the low risk and high profitability of organised immigration crime.
