= International Nuclear Regulators' Association =

The International Nuclear Regulators' Association (INRA) was established in January 1997 and is an association of the most senior officials of the nuclear regulatory authorities of the following countries:

- Canada: Canadian Nuclear Safety Commission
- France: Autorité de sûreté nucléaire et de radioprotection
- Germany:
- Japan: Japanese Atomic Energy Commission
- Republic of Korea: Nuclear Safety and Security Commission
- Spain: Nuclear Safety Council (Spain)
- Sweden: Swedish Radiation Safety Authority
- United Kingdom: Office for Nuclear Regulation
- United States: Nuclear Regulatory Commission

The main purpose of the association is to influence and enhance nuclear safety, from the regulatory prospective, among its members and worldwide.

Other international nuclear organizations include International Atomic Energy Agency and Nuclear Energy Agency.

== Notable people ==
- Laurence Williams, Chairman from 2000 to 2002
