= National Document Fraud Unit =

The National Document Fraud Unit (NDFU) is a central unit within the Home Office, based from two offices, one in Liverpool and another office near London Heathrow Airport. The NDFU is the UK's national centre for identifying travel and identity document fraud.

== Overview ==
NDFU provides information on genuine, forged, counterfeit and fantasy documents to law enforcement agencies nationally and overseas, working with Interpol and the International Civil Aviation Organization to establish document standards. It also liaises with security document manufacturers and issuers to ensure that the UK remains a leader in the field of travel document security.

== History ==
The NDFU has existed for over 35 years. In 2008, the work carried out by the NDFU resulted in 7800 fraudulent travel documents being identified by the UK Border Agency.

== Role ==
The NDFU's role is to:

- Gather intelligence on travel and identity document fraud.
- Provide specialist advice and forgery detection training to UK non-governmental and overseas partners.
- Train staff from the Home Office, UK Visas and Immigration, and other government departments in identifying fraudulent travel and identity documents.
- Provide expert document examiners to analyze suspect travel and identity documents and provide expert witness testimony to the Courts of the United Kingdom.

In addition, the NDFU maintains one of the largest and most comprehensive libraries of specimen genuine and fraudulent travel documents in the world.
