= Owen Evans (civil servant) =

Welsh civil servant

HM Chief Inspector of Education and Training in Wales
- Incumbent
- Assumed office January 2022
- Preceded by: Meilyr Rowlands

Chief Executive of S4C
- In office October 2017 – January 2022

Personal details
- Education: Swansea University

Owen Evans is a Welsh civil servant.

== Early life and education ==
Owen Evans was educated at Ysgol Gyfun Gymunedol Penweddig in Aberystwyth, Wales. Evans completed his A-level in Economics in one year, and after leaving school, went on to study the subject at Swansea University, graduating in 1991.

== Career ==
Evans sat as a member of the Welsh Language Board from 2005 to 2010.

Evans was appointed chief executive of the Welsh-language public broadcaster S4C in October 2017.

In July 2021, it was announced that Evans would leave S4C to succeed Meilyr Rowlands as the head of the Welsh education inspectorate Estyn in January 2022.
