= David Neal (British Army officer) =

Independent Chief Inspector of Borders and Immigration

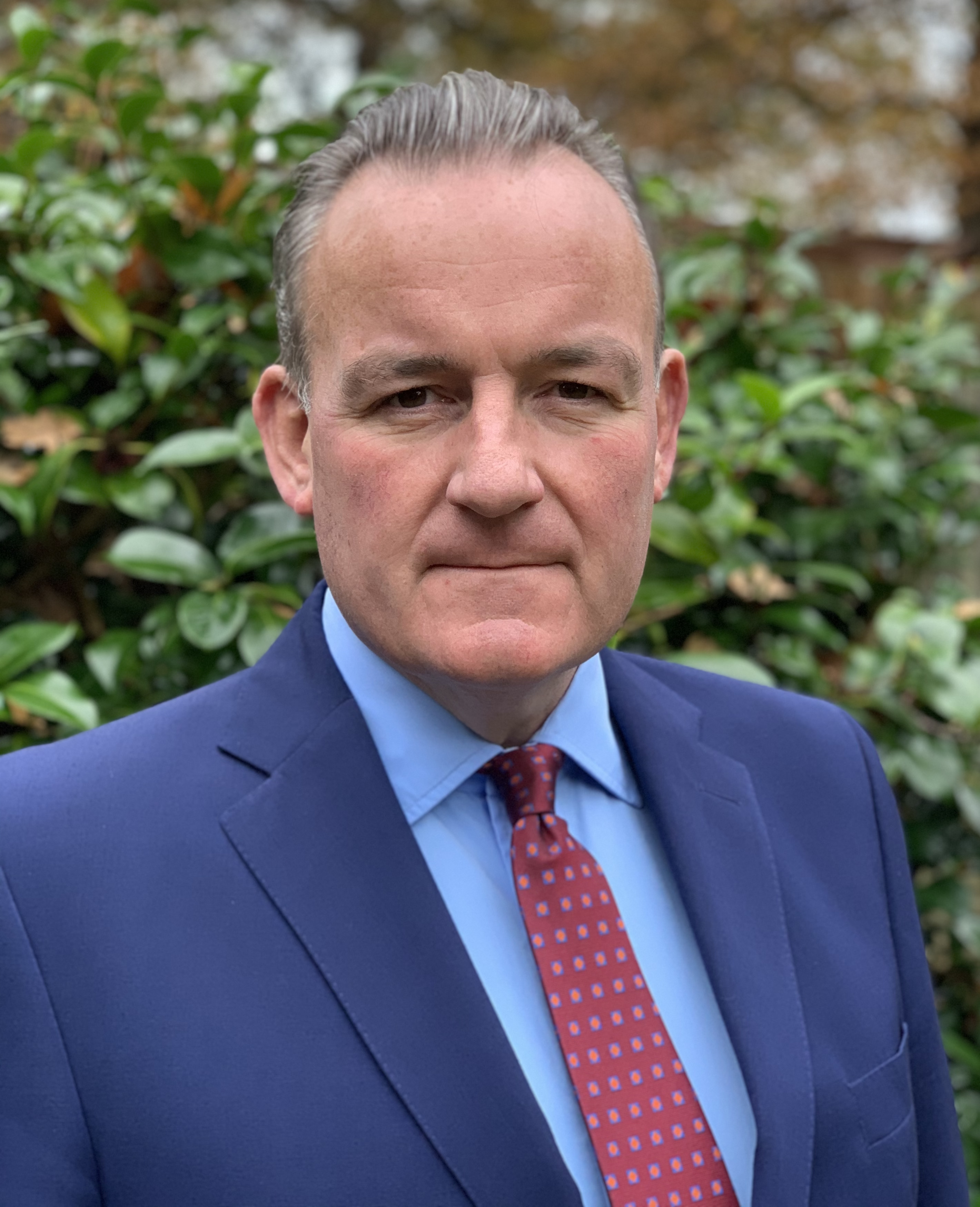

Independent Chief Inspector of Borders and Immigration
- In office 22 March 2021 – 20 February 2024
- Monarch: Elizabeth II
- Prime Minister: Boris Johnson
- Preceded by: David Bolt

Personal details
- Education: Royal Military Academy Sandhurst, Bangor University, Cranfield University

Military service
- Allegiance: United Kingdom
- Branch/service: British Army
- Rank: Brigadier
- Commands: 1st Military Police Brigade

David Neal was the Independent Chief Inspector of Borders and Immigration from March 2021 to February 2024, and a retired Royal Military Police officer. He was appointed by Home Secretary Priti Patel, succeeding David Bolt.

== Military career ==
David Neal graduated from Bangor University with a BA in English Literature in 1993. He attended the Royal Military Academy Sandhurst on Commissioning Course 933 and was commissioned into the Royal Military Police on 20 September 1994.

After service on exercise and operations across the world, on 22 July 2016, he was appointed by The Queen as the Provost Marshal (Army) and Commander of 1 Military Police Brigade in the rank of Brigadier.

He accepted the Freedom of the City of Salisbury on behalf of the Royal Military Police on 14 June 2018. This freedom was exercised by the Royal Military Police at Armed Forces Day on 29 June 2019.

Neal faced extensive criticism during a public inquiry into Operation Northmoor, a Royal Military Police (RMP) investigation into allegations of war crimes committed by the SAS in Afghanistan. The investigation, which examined claims that SAS operatives were involved in the extrajudicial killing of unarmed civilians during night raids, was prematurely closed in 2019 without any charges being brought. Neal was criticised for failing to maintain a policy file or logbook documenting critical decisions, inadequately resourcing the investigation, and issuing an unexplained order preventing the use of a £7.58 million data handling system purchased to support the inquiry. These actions, coupled with reports of obstruction by UK Special Forces, were cited as significant factors undermining the investigation’s ability to pursue key lines of inquiry and secure vital evidence.

== Blackstone Consultancy ==
After leaving the Army he was employed by London-based Blackstone Consultancy as a Strategic Security Advisor. He was a finalist in the UK Outstanding Security Performance Awards (OSPAs) 2021, nominated as Outstanding Security Consultant.

== Independent Chief Inspector of Borders and Immigration (ICIBI) ==
David Neal was appointed the third individual appointed to the post of Independent Chief Inspector of Borders and Immigration. The ICIBI is an independent monitoring body that reports on the efficiency and effectiveness of the immigration, asylum, nationality and customs functions carried out by the Home Secretary, officials and others on their behalf.

Neal gave evidence to the Home Affairs Select Committee in June 2022, where it was revealed that he had not met Home Secretary Priti Patel since his appointment in March 2021. In July 2022, the Home Office published a delayed report produced by Neal into the English Channel irregular migrant small boats crossings which was highly critical of the Home Office's performance and response.

On 24 October 2022, Neal again gave evidence to the Home Affairs Select Committee which exposed serious overcrowding at Manston arrivals and processing centre, conditions which Neal described as "wretched". This evidence prompted an urgent question in the House of Commons from the Chair of the Home Affairs Select Committee, Dame Diana Johnson MP, on 26 October 2022. A second urgent question on the same subject was tabled by Sir Roger Gale MP on 7 November 2022.

On 12 September 2023 in an interview with the Times, Neal reported that Immigration Minister Robert Jenrick was refusing a meeting to discuss Neal's findings from a visit to the Bibby Stockholm barge. Neal described the removal in August of asylum seekers from the barge after the discovery of legionella bacteria as a "shambles".

Later that month, OpenDemocracy reported that Neal's appointment would not be extended after his 3-year contract ended in March 2024 and that he had been 'sacked' for being excessively critical of the Home Office in reports dated from February 2022. These reports were accessed through Freedom of Information requests.

Neal was dismissed from his position on 20 February 2024 after a dispute with the Home Office over the release of information relating to the alleged lack of security over flights landing at London City Airport.

In February 2024 Neal submitted written evidence to the Home Affairs Committee, outlining 10 areas that he viewed necessary to make the ICIBI more effective. These included the introduction of cross Whitehall inspection powers, access to Home Office commercial contracts and increased powers to publish the ICIBI's reports.

On 4 March 2025, an urgent question was placed in the House of Commons by the Chair of the Home Affairs Select Committee, Dame Diana Johnson MP, asking the Secretary of State for the Home Office to make a statement on the publication of 13 reports by the former ICIBI and how the inspectorate will now operate in the absence of a chief inspector or deputy? Neal was criticised by Tom Pursglove the Minister responding to the urgent question, but praised by Chi Onwurah as a "diligent and dogged public servant" and a "incredibly impressive, robust, informed, all over the detail and entirely independent".

His name was mentioned in The Times on 21 March 2026, as a "good candidate" to replace Martin Hewitt, as the Border Security Commander.

== Specialist Advisor to the Home Affairs Select Committee ==
In formal minutes released on 12 December 2024 it was revealed that Neal was appointed as a Specialist Advisor to the Home Affairs Select Committee in matters relating to borders and immigration on 17 April 2024.

In formal minutes released on 22 May 2025, it was revealed that on 17 December 2024 Neal was again appointed as a Specialist Advisor to the Home Affairs Select Committee in matters relating to borders and immigration.

He was listed as assisting in the highly critical Home Affairs Committee report into asylum accommodation contracts on 27 October 2025.

== Media ==
Neal captained the Bangor University alumni team which reached the semi-finals of TV quiz University Challenge on 28 December 2023. The team were beaten by the eventual winners of the competition, Middlesex University.

Neal featured in the Spectator magazine's podcast Coffee House Shots on 27 February 2024 in an episode entitled 'David Neal versus the Home Office'.

Neal was also a judge for the 2023/2024 British Kebab Awards.

He was the featured guest on The Today Podcast, which aired on BBC Radio 4 on 14 March 2024, where he was interviewed about his experiences as the ICIBI.

Neal was shortlisted for the 2024 Contrarian Prize.
