= RAF Manston =

Military/civilian aerodrome in Kent, England

RAF Manston
- Near Manston, Kent in England
- Arise to Protect

Site information
- Type: Royal Air Force station
- Code: MQ
- Owner: Ministry of Defence (MoD)
- Operator: Royal Naval Air Service (1916–1918); Royal Air Force (1918–1952) and (1958–1999); United States Air Force (1952–1958)
- Controlled by: RAF Fighter Command 1939–194? * No. 11 Group RAF; RAF Transport Command 194?-1950
- Condition: Closed

Location
- Location in Kent RAF Manston (the United Kingdom)
- Coordinates: 51.348°N 1.350°E
- Grid reference: TR333662

Site history
- Built: 1916
- Built by: John Laing & Son Ltd
- In use: 1916–1999
- Fate: Airfield amalgamated with Kent International Airport.; Remainder of site retained by the MOD as the Fire Service Central Training Establishment which subsequently became the Defence Fire Training and Development Centre.
- Battles/wars: First World War; European theatre of World War II; Cold War

Airfield information
- Elevation: 46 metres (151 ft) AMSL
Runways
Direction	Length and surface
10/28	2,752 metres (9,029 ft) Asphalt

Royal Air Force Manston or more simply RAF Manston is a former Royal Air Force station located in the north-east of Kent, at grid reference TR334663 on the Isle of Thanet from 1916 until 1996. The site was split between a commercial airport Kent International Airport (KIA), since closed, and a continuing military use by the Defence Fire Training and Development Centre (DFTDC), following on from a long-standing training facility for RAF firefighters at the RAF Manston base.

== History ==
=== First World War ===
At the outset of the First World War, the Isle of Thanet was equipped with a small and precarious landing strip for aircraft at St Mildreds Bay, Westgate, on top of the chalk cliffs, at the foot of which was a promenade which had been used for seaplane operations.

The landing grounds atop the cliff soon became the scene of several accidents, with at least one plane seen to fail to stop before the end of the cliffs and tumble into the sea which, fortunately for the pilot, had been on its inward tide.

In the winter of 1915–1916 these early aircraft first began to use the open farmlands at Manston as a site for emergency landings. Thus was soon established the Admiralty Aerodrome at Manston. It was not long after this that the training school, set up originally to instruct pilots in the use of the new Handley-Page O/400 bombers, was established, and so by the close of 1916 there were already two distinct units stationed at Manston, the Operational War Flight Command and the Handley Page Training School.

Its location near the Kent coast gave Manston some advantages over the other previously established aerodromes and regular additions in men and machinery were soon made, particularly, in these early days, from Detling. By 1917 the Royal Flying Corps was well established and taking an active part in the defence of England.

At a time when Zeppelin raids were bringing the war directly to English civilians, daylight bombing raids by German 'Gotha' Bombers, a twin engined biplane, would have been considerably more effective were it not for the RFC's presence at Manston.

The German air raids had lasted for thirteen weeks, the last being on 22 August 1917. On this occasion, of the 15 bombers that set out for England five did not reach the Kent coast, and the 'spirited' intervention from Manston-based fighters prevented those remaining from flying further west, three being destroyed outright and the remaining seven returning to Germany with dead and wounded on board.

Shortly after such formation raids and in consequence the Cabinet recommended the creation of a separate Air Ministry. The RAF was officially formed on 1 April 1918.

=== Second World War ===
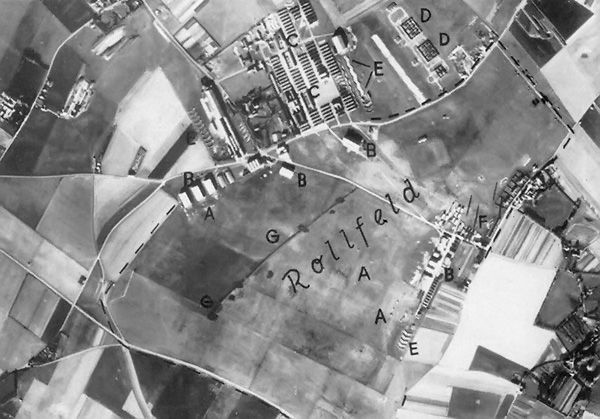
A Luftwaffe aerial photograph of RAF Manston at the outbreak of war in 1939 when it was still an all-grass airfield

At the start of the Second World War, Manston hosted a School of Air Navigation but this was quickly moved out. On 10 September 1939, No. 3 Squadron RAF flew in equipped with Hawker Hurricanes and Manston was put under the command of No. 11 Group Fighter Command. No. 235 and No. 253 Squadron RAF both arrived on 30 October 1939 and stayed until October 1940. No. 79 Squadron arrived on 12 November 1939.

During an eventful Battle of Britain, Manston was heavily bombed; at its height (August 1940) diary entries recorded a steady stream of damage to aircraft and buildings. The station was also littered with unexploded bombs. This caused many staff to move to nearby woods for at least a week. Others were dispersed to surrounding housing. For example, WAAFs (members of the Women's Auxiliary Air Force) stationed at Manston were billeted at the nearby Ursuline Convent in Westgate-on-Sea.

In May 1943, Manston was used in the testing of Barnes Wallis' prototype bouncing bomb. Pilots from No. 617 Squadron flew to Manston to have inert mines loaded into their Lancaster bombers, which they then dropped at Reculver to prepare for the Dambusters raid; the first tests were carried out on 11 May, with further tests across the following days. A prototype is on public display at the RAF Manston History Museum.

Hawker Typhoon attack aircraft were based at Manston later in the war, and also No. 616 Squadron RAF, the first Meteor jet squadron, arriving 21 July 1944 and staying until 21 January 1945. Manston was used as one of the departure points for military gliders of the Glider Pilot Regiment to transport troops and equipment in Operation Market Garden. It was one of the few airfields installed with the Fog, Intensive, Dispersal Of (FIDO) system designed to remove fog from airfields by burning it off with petrol.

Along with RAF Carnaby and RAF Woodbridge, Manston was developed as an east coast emergency landing ground for bomber crews. These airfields were intended for use by returning bombers suffering from low-fuel and/or suspected damage to their pneumatic (wheel brake) and/or hydraulic (undercarriage) systems. All three airfields were equipped with a single runway, 9,000 ft (2,700 m) (long and 750 ft (230 m) wide. There was a further clear area of 1,500 ft (460 m) at each end of the runway. At each of the three airfields, the runway was divided into three 250 ft (76 m) lanes. The northern and central lanes were allocated by flying control, while the southern lane was the emergency lane on which any aircraft could land without first making contact with the airfield.

The hilltop site was chosen as it was usually fog-free and had no approach obstructions. Being close to the front line, the airfield became something of a magnet for badly damaged aircraft that had suffered from ground fire, collisions, or air attack but retained a degree of airworthiness. The airfield became something of a "graveyard" for heavy bombers. The museums on site display some startling aerial views dating from this era and the post-war years. After the war, the runway was reconfigured, being reduced to 200 ft (61 m) in width with a full-length parallel taxiway, both within the original paved width.

=== USAF use ===
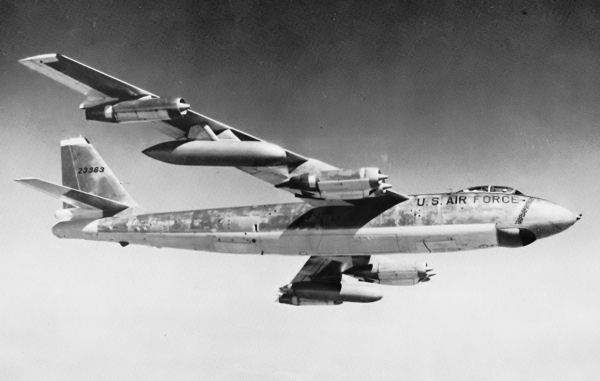
USAF Boeing B-47E-50-LM, AF Ser. No. 52-3363, in flight.

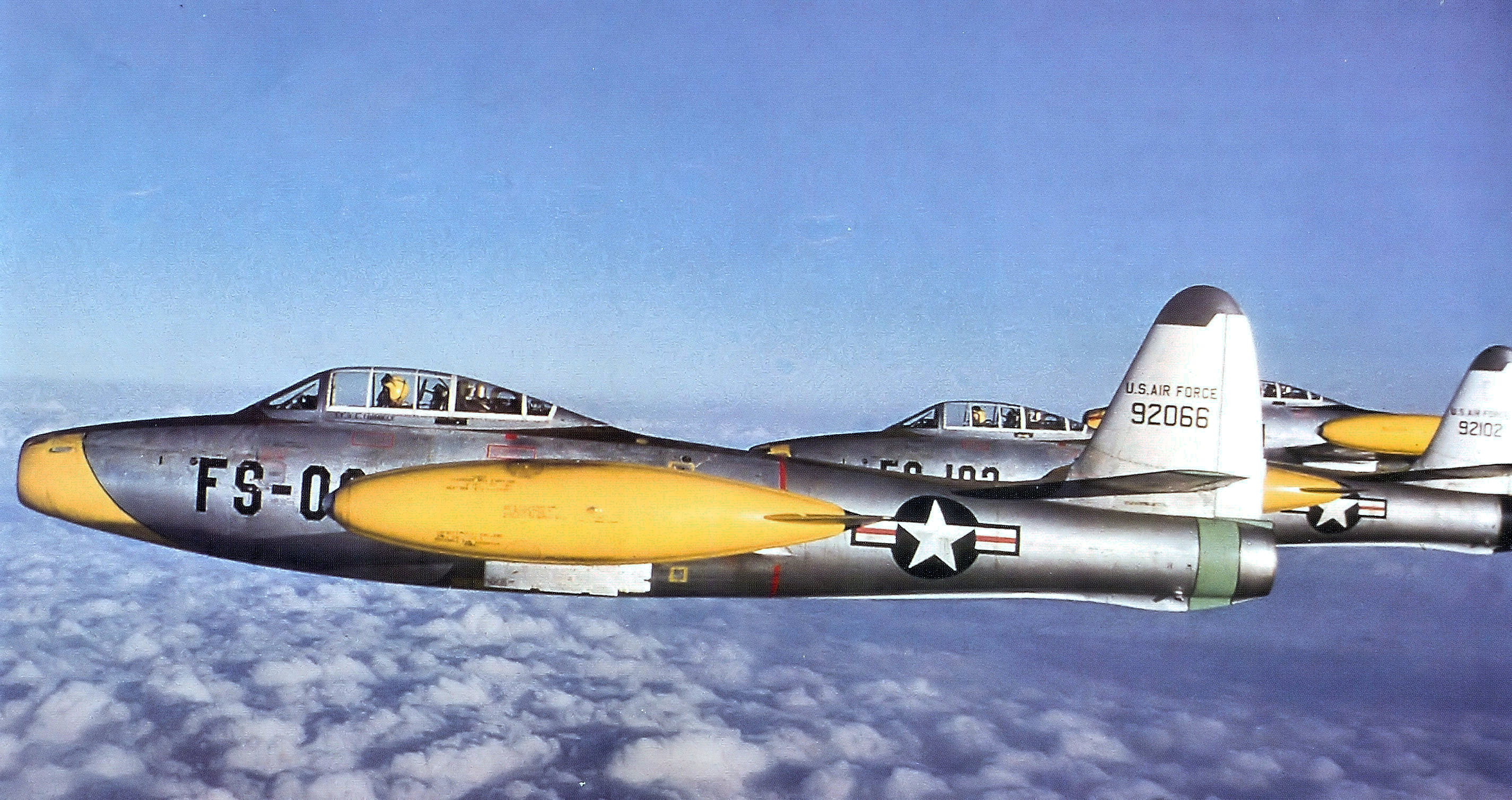
Republic F-84E-1-RE Thunderjets of the 512th Fighter-Bomber Squadron. AF Ser. No. 49-2066 is in the foreground.

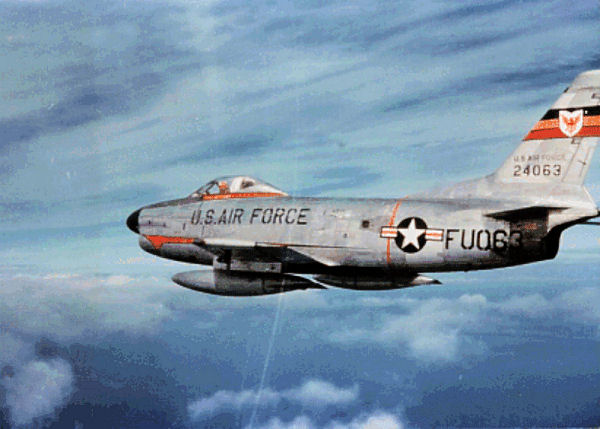
North American F-86D-45-NA Sabre, AF Ser. No. 52-4063, of the 513th Fighter Interceptor Squadron

During the Cold War of the 1950s the United States Air Force used RAF Manston as a Strategic Air Command base for its bomber, fighter and fighter-bomber units.

In the early 1950s, SAC's backbone bombers were the Convair B-36 Peacemaker and Boeing B-47 Stratojet. To support this strategy, the SAC 7th Air Division was established in May 1951. At the time, Manston had only partially recovered from the ravages of the Second World War. There were still makeshift bomb shelters, i.e. trenches with tin roofs, and many large circles of lush green grass where Luftwaffe bombs had cratered the runway. The RAF control tower overlooked a hilltop runway (10/28), which was 750 feet (230 m) wide and 9,000 feet (2,700 m) long. The 7th AD expanded Manston by building concrete bunkers suitable for nuclear weapons and upgrading the support facilities for long-term use.

By the summer of 1953, the 7th AD began a series of temporary deployments of B-47 and B-36 wings from the United States to the United Kingdom. These deployments generally involved about 45 aircraft, together with about 20 Boeing KC-97 Stratofreighters which were maintained at the English bases for 90 days. At the end of the Temporary Duty (TDY), they were relieved by another SAC wing that was generally stationed at a different airfield. These deployments continued until 1955 when SAC shifted its rotational deployments to RAF Fairford and Manston was turned over to the United States Air Forces in Europe.

In July 1951 SAC deployed the 12th Fighter-Escort Wing to Manston to provide fighter escort for its rotational bombardment wings. The 12th, however, only remained at Manston until 30 November when it was replaced by the 123rd Fighter-Bomber Wing, with the 12th being transferred to Japan for combat duty during the Korean War.

The 123rd was an umbrella wing that was formed from several Air National Guard squadrons activated for federal service during the Korean War. This wing was activated at Manston with three ANG fighter squadrons:

- 156th Fighter-Bomber Squadron (North Carolina ANG)
- 165th Fighter-Bomber Squadron (Kentucky ANG)
- 167th Fighter-Bomber Squadron (West Virginia ANG)

The 123d utilized the F-84E "Thunderjets" left behind by the 12th FEW and continued the same mission of fighter escort of SAC's bombers.

In July 1952 the Air National Guard squadrons were returned to State control, and USAFE assumed the fighter escort role. In its place, the 406th Fighter-Bomber Wing was activated in place at Manston with the following squadrons assigned:

- 512th Fighter-Bomber Squadron (Yellow Stripe)
- 513th Fighter-Bomber Squadron (Red Stripe)
- 514th Fighter-Bomber Squadron (Dark Blue Stripe)

Initially, the 406th utilized the existing F-84Es, however in August 1953, the F-86F "Sabre" began to arrive to replace them.

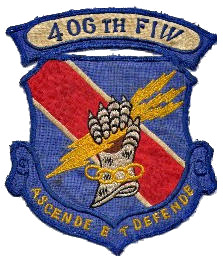

A change of mission for the 406th in April 1954 from fighter-bomber to fighter-interceptor came with a change of equipment. The F-86D Sabre interceptor began to arrive and the F-86F's were transferred to other USAFE squadrons and NATO countries. In addition, the 512th FBS was transferred to Soesterberg Air Base, Netherlands with their F-86Fs.

In June F-86D's arrived from CONUS to equip the 87th Fighter-Interceptor Squadron which was transferred to the 406th from the 81st FBW assigned to RAF Shepherds Grove. The 87th FIS, however, physically remained at Shepherds Grove, but was under the organisational command of the 406th at Manston. In September 1955, the 87th was redesignated the 512th FIS.

On 15 May 1958 the 406th was inactivated, with its three air defence squadrons being assigned to continental Europe under the 86th Air Division (Defense) at Ramstein Air Base West Germany. The squadrons were transferred to the following bases:

- 512th FIS to Sembach Air Base, West Germany
- 513th FIS to Phalsbourg-Bourscheid Air Base France
- 514th FIS to Ramstein Air Base, West Germany

The F-86D's were eventually withdrawn from Europe in 1961, and the 512th, 513th and 514th were inactivated.

After the transfer of the USAFE interceptors at Manston the base was returned to the RAF control.

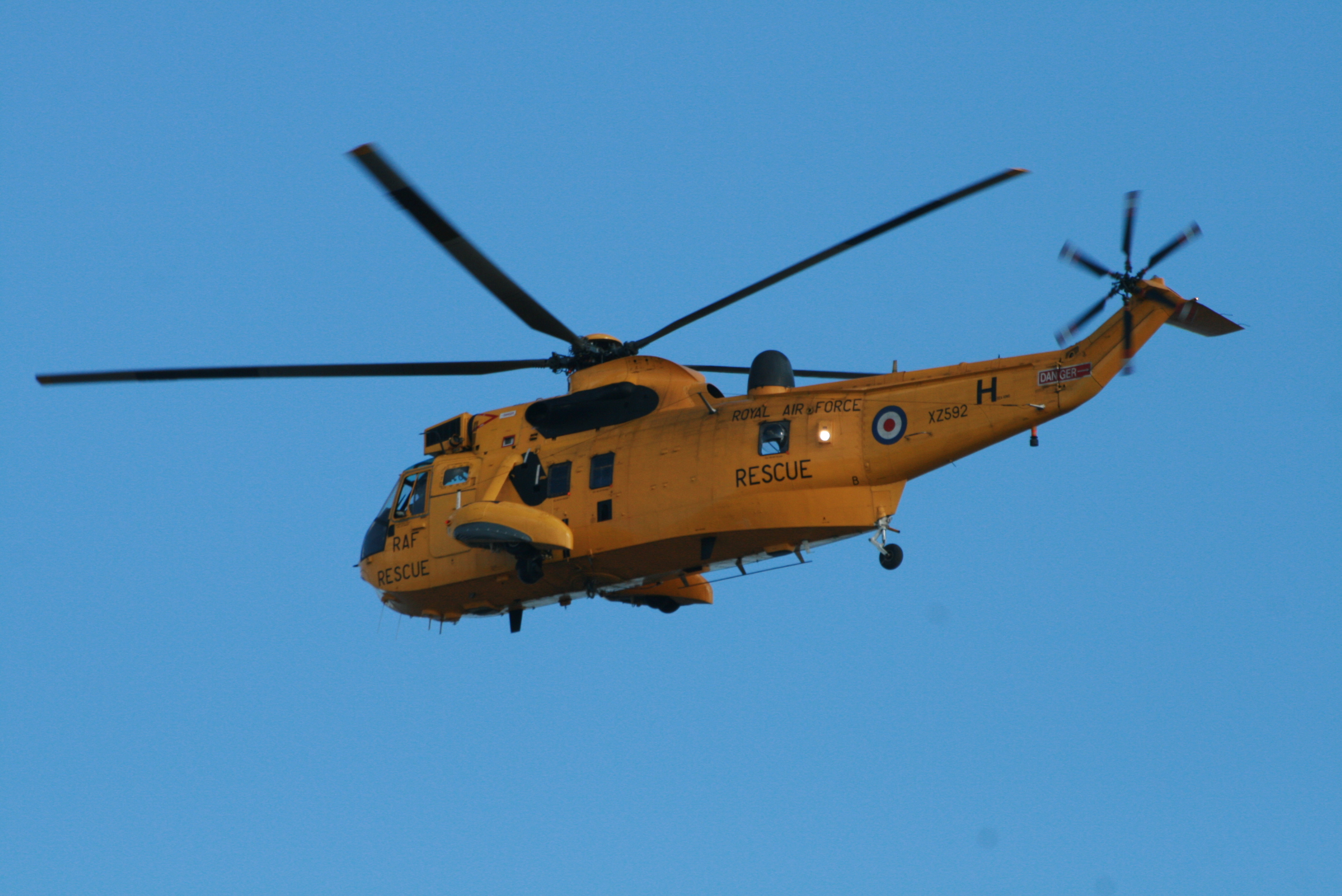
A Sea King HAR.3 of 202 RAF Squadron, who operated this type of aircraft from RAF Manston between 1988 and 1994

=== Return to RAF use ===
With the USAF's withdrawal from Manston, the airfield became a joint civilian and RAF airport from 1960 and was thence employed for occasional package tour and cargo flights, alongside its continuing role as an RAF base. The Air Cadets used the northern side of the airfield as a gliding site, and No. 1 Air Experience Flight RAF flying de Havilland Canada DHC-1 Chipmunks was also based there. Thanks to its long runway, Manston was designated as one of the UK's MEDAs (Military Emergency Diversion Airfields) for emergency military and civilian landings. Others included RAF Greenham Common, RAF Aldergrove and RAF Machrihanish.

For a number of years, the base operated as a Master Diversion Airfield, open 24 hours every day. Manston, uniquely in the UK, also had a 'foam carpet' crash landing system, where two tractors would pull tankers laying a metre thick layer of foam over a strip of runway, for aircraft with landing gear problems.

=== Search and rescue base ===
RAF Manston was home to a helicopter search and rescue (SAR) flight from No. 22 Squadron RAF from 1961, operating Westland Whirlwind aircraft. The flight was withdrawn in 1969, but the outcry led to the RAF contracting Bristow Helicopters from 1971 to 1974 to provide a continued service (also using MK3 Whirlwhinds). In 1972, the Bristow crew was awarded the "Wreck Shield" for "Most Meritorious Rescue in 1972" by the Department of Trade and Industry.

In 1974, the RAF SAR teams returned, with No. 72 Squadron RAF operating two Westland Wessex HC2 aircraft to replace the Bristow cover. The flight was transferred back to No. 22 Squadron in June 1976. In 1988 No. 202 Squadron RAF moved to Manston with their Westland Sea King HAR.3, with the Wessex aircraft moving to RAF Coltishall. The Sea Kings remained at Manston until July 1994, when SAR activity at the base was halted, and SAR cover for the channel relocated to RAF Wattisham.

=== Units ===
The following squadrons were here at some point:

- No. 1 Squadron RAF
- No. 2 Squadron RAF
- No. 3 Squadron RAF
- No. 4 Squadron RAF
- No. 9 Squadron RAF
- No. 16 Squadron RAF
- No. 18 Squadron RAF
- No. 21 Squadron RAF
- No. 22 Squadron RAF
- No. 23 Squadron RAF
- No. 26 Squadron RAF
- No. 29 Squadron RAF
- No. 32 Squadron RAF
- No. 33 Squadron RAF
- No. 39 Squadron RAF
- No. 46 Squadron RAF
- No. 48 Squadron RAF
- No. 56 Squadron RAF
- No. 59 Squadron RAF
- No. 62 Squadron RAF
- No. 63 Squadron RAF
- No. 69 Squadron RAF
- No. 72 Squadron RAF
- No. 74 Squadron RAF
- No. 77 Squadron RAF
- No. 79 Squadron RAF
- No. 80 Squadron RAF
- No. 88 Squadron RAF
- No. 91 Squadron RAF
- No. 92 Squadron RAF
- No. 101 Squadron RAF
- No. 107 Squadron RAF
- No. 110 Squadron RAF
- No. 118 Squadron RAF
- No. 119 Squadron RAF
- No. 124 Squadron RAF
- No. 130 Squadron RAF
- No. 137 Squadron RAF
- No. 139 Squadron RAF
- No. 143 Squadron RAF
- No. 151 Squadron RAF
- No. 158 Squadron RAF
- No. 164 Squadron RAF
- No. 174 Squadron RAF
- No. 175 Squadron RAF
- No. 181 Squadron RAF
- No. 183 Squadron RAF
- No. 184 Squadron RAF
- No. 193 Squadron RAF
- No. 197 Squadron RAF
- No. 198 Squadron RAF
- No. 202 Squadron RAF
- No. 206 Squadron RAF
- No. 213 Squadron RAF
- No. 217 Squadron RAF
- No. 219 Squadron RAF
- No. 222 Squadron RAF
- No. 224 Squadron RAF
- No. 226 Squadron RAF
- No. 229 Squadron RAF
- No. 235 Squadron RAF
- No. 236 Squadron RAF
- No. 239 Squadron RAF
- No. 242 Squadron RAF
- No. 253 Squadron RAF
- No. 257 Squadron RAF
- No. 263 Squadron RAF
- No. 266 Squadron RAF
- No. 274 Squadron RAF
- No. 305 Polish Bomber Squadron
- No. 310 (Czechoslovak) Squadron RAF
- No. 311 (Czechoslovak) Squadron RAF
- No. 312 (Czechoslovak) Squadron RAF
- No. 313 (Czechoslovak) Squadron RAF
- No. 331 (Norwegian) Squadron RAF
- No. 332 (Norwegian) Squadron RAF
- No. 403 Squadron RCAF
- No. 406 Squadron RCAF
- No. 415 Squadron RCAF
- No. 421 Squadron RCAF
- No. 451 Squadron RAAF
- No. 455 Squadron RAAF
- No. 500 (County of Kent) Squadron AAF
- No. 501 (County of Gloucester) Squadron AAF
- No. 504 (County of Nottingham) Squadron AAF
- No. 567 Squadron RAF
- No. 600 (City of London) Squadron AAF
- No. 601 (County of London) Squadron AAF
- No. 604 (County of Middlesex) Squadron AAF
- No. 605 (County of Warwick) Squadron AAF
- No. 607 (County of Durham) Squadron AAF
- No. 609 (West Riding) Squadron AAF
- No. 611 (West Lancashire) Squadron AAF
- No. 615 (County of Surrey) Squadron AAF
- No. 616 (South Yorkshire) Squadron AAF
- No. 618 Squadron RAF
- 765 Naval Air Squadron
- 812 Naval Air Squadron
- 819 Naval Air Squadron
- 820 Naval Air Squadron
- 821 Naval Air Squadron
- 822 Naval Air Squadron
- 823 Naval Air Squadron
- 825 Naval Air Squadron
- 832 Naval Air Squadron
- 841 Naval Air Squadron
- 848 Naval Air Squadron

Units

- Gladiator Flight
- No. 1 General Reconnaissance Unit RAF
- No. 3 General Reconnaissance Unit RAF
- No. 3 School of Technical Training RAF
- No. 6 Flying Training School RAF
- No. 50 (Army Co-operation) Wing RAF
- No. 50 Training Depot Station RAF
- No. 86 Maintenance Unit RAF
- No. 91 Staging Post
- No. 123 Airfield Headquarters RAF
- No. 155 (General Reconnaissance) Wing RAF
- No. 203 Training Depot Station RAF became No. 55 Training Depot Station RAF
- No. 470 (Fighter) Flight RAF
- No. 555 (Light Bomber) Flight RAF
- No. 556 (Light Bomber) Flight RAF
- No. 617 Gliding School RAF
- No. 617 Volunteer Gliding School RAF
- No. 618 Gliding School RAF
- No. 618 Volunteer Gliding School RAF
- No. 1333 Wing RAF Regiment
- No. 1401 Meteorological Flight RAF
- No. 2701 Squadron RAF Regiment
- No. 2715 Squadron RAF Regiment
- No. 2720 Squadron RAF Regiment
- No. 2726 Squadron RAF Regiment
- No. 2733 Squadron RAF Regiment
- No. 2758 Squadron RAF Regiment
- No. 2762 Squadron RAF Regiment
- No. 2763 Squadron RAF Regiment
- No. 2778 Squadron RAF Regiment
- No. 2782 Squadron RAF Regiment
- No. 2794 Squadron RAF Regiment
- No. 2795 Squadron RAF Regiment
- No. 2844 Squadron RAF Regiment
- No. 2898 Squadron RAF Regiment
- No. 2909 Squadron RAF Regiment
- Overseas Ferry Unit RAF
- Pool of Pilots, Manston RAF
- S.C.R.584 Training Unit RAF
- School of Technical Training (Men)
- Seaplane Training Squadron RAF

== Civilian use ==
For some years two commercial airlines operated out of Manston, Invicta Airways and Air Ferry. Many thousands of holiday passengers started their journeys from Manston.

From 1989 Manston became styled as Kent International Airport, and a new terminal was officially opened that year by the Duchess of York.

== Closure ==
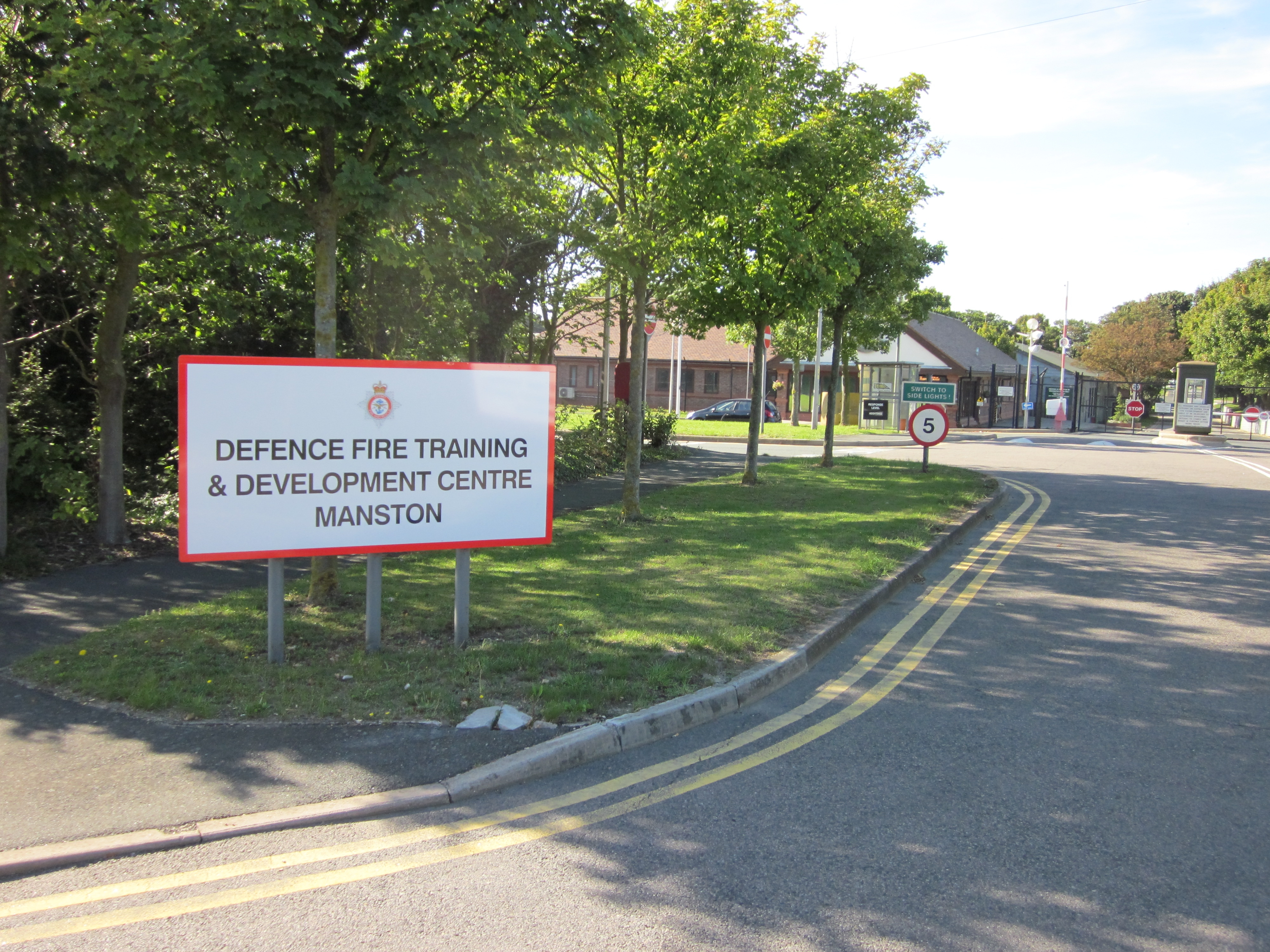
The DFTDC was an active military base.

In 1996, Manston's satellite station RAF Ash, was closed, and in 1999, it was decided to close the RAF Manston base. The 'airside' portion of the base was signed over to the commercial operator of Kent International Airport.

The MoD decided to keep the central fire training school (CTE) facility open, and almost the entirety of the 'domestic' side of the base became FSCTE Manston (Fire Service Central Training Establishment). In 2007 the Army took over responsibility for firefighting across the armed services (except the Royal Navy whose Aircraft Handling Branch are the fire fighters at Naval Air Stations and are trained at RNAS Culdrose at the School of Flight Deck Operations) and the school became the Defence Fire Training and Development Centre (DFTDC). The site is set to be closed in 2025.

== Accidents ==
- On 18 September 1948, an RAF de Havilland Mosquito crashed during an air show at RAF Manston, killing both crew and ten members of the public.
- On 27 April 1952, an American Republic F-84E Thunderjet (Serial Number 49-2111), of 165 Fighter Bomber Squadron, 1323 Fighter Bomber Group, United States Air Force, that was based at Manston crashed at nearby St Peter's, Kent as a result of an engine fire. The pilot, Captain Clifford Vincent Fogarty, was killed, as were three residents of St Peter's.
- As a Master Diversion Airfield, RAF Manston witnessed numerous emergency landings both civil and military. Any aircraft reporting undercarriage problems would be diverted to Manston. All aircraft landed successfully on the foam carpet with reduced or no undercarriage, and no injuries or fatalities were ever reported by the Civil Aviation Authority.

== Museums ==
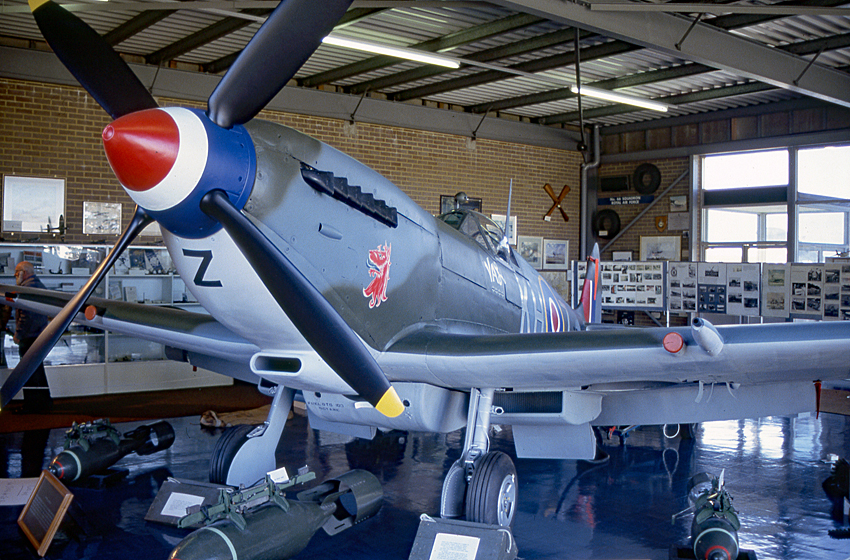
Spitfire MkXVI in museum

There are currently two museums on the former RAF Manston site, in a cluster on the north side :

- The RAF Manston History Museum
- The Spitfire and Hurricane Memorial Museum

The two museums used to host an air show, which was held most recently in 2011.

A third museum in the cluster, the Manston Fire Museum within the DFTDC site, is now closed.

== Popular culture ==
=== Film and TV ===
RAF Manston was featured as the hypothetical target of a Soviet nuclear attack in the Oscar winning 1965 film The War Game.

=== Video games ===
In the vehicular combat multiplayer video game War Thunder, the 'Britain' map centers around RAF Manston. The map itself is based on the southeast coast of England, depicting just under half of the county of Kent, the Strait of Dover, and a small part of France (in the southeast corner of the map, usually well outside the playable area). Although the details of the map are not completely accurate in some areas, dimensionally the map, as well as RAF Manston, and other landmarks such as Dover Castle and the Port of Dover, are a 1:1 scale.
