= Estyn =

Education and training inspectorate for Wales

Estyn His Majesty's Inspectorate of Education and Training in Wales

Non-ministerial government department overview
- Formed: 1992
- Jurisdiction: Wales
- Headquarters: Anchor Court, Keen Road, Cardiff, CF24 5JW
- Employees: c.100 permanent staff
- Non-ministerial government department executive: Owen Evans, His Majesty's Chief Inspector of Education and Training
- Website: www.estyn.gov.wales

Estyn is the education and training inspectorate for Wales, and the office of His Majesty’s Chief Inspectorate of Education and Training in Wales. Its name comes from the Welsh language verb estyn meaning 'to reach (out), stretch or extend'. Its function is to provide an independent inspection and advice service on quality and standards in education and training provided in Wales. The body is equivalent to His Majesty's Inspectorate of Education and Education Scotland in Scotland, and Ofsted in England.

The inspectorate was established in 1992 as a Crown body under the Education (Schools) Act 1992, as the Her Majesty’s Inspectorate of Schools in Wales, later the Office of Her Majesty’s Chief Inspector in Wales. It adopted the name Estyn in 2004. Inspectors were first appointed in England and Wales in 1839, with a separate inspectorate for Wales created in 1907.

It is independent from, but funded by, the Welsh Government (section 104 of the Government of Wales Act 1998). His Majesty's Chief Inspector of Education and Training in Wales and their staff are Crown and civil servants.

The purpose of Estyn is to inspect and report on the quality and standards of education and training provided in Wales, including:

- how far education and training meet the needs of learners and contribute to their development and wellbeing;
- standards achieved; and
- the quality of leadership and training.

Estyn's head office is in Cardiff. Estyn was awarded Investors in People Gold (IIP) accreditation in March 2011 and was re-awarded IIP Gold in 2018.

== Range of inspection ==
Estyn inspects the following:

- nursery schools and settings that are maintained by, or receive funding from, local authorities;
- primary schools;
- secondary schools;
- special schools;
- pupil referral units;
- independent schools;
- further education;
- independent specialist colleges;
- adult community learning;
- local authority education services for children and young people;
- regional consortia for school improvement;
- teacher education and training;
- Welsh for adults;
- work-based learning; and
- learning in the justice sector.

Inspection reports are published on the Estyn website.

== Objectives ==
=== Strategic objectives ===
Estyn's strategic objectives are:

- Provide public accountability to service users on the quality and standards of education and training provision in Wales;
- Inform the development of national policy by the Welsh Government; and
- Build capacity in the delivery of education and training in Wales.

Estyn works in collaboration with the Care and Social Services Inspectorate for Wales, Healthcare Inspectorate Wales and Wales Audit Office to implement the Welsh Government's policy statement on Inspection, Audit and Regulation. In partnership with Ofsted, Estyn has responsibility for inspecting learners in England who are funded by the Welsh Government and who attend independent special schools, work-based learning courses, and provision for young people in youth offending teams. Estyn inspects, through joint working with HMI Probation and HMI Prisons, the education of offenders in secure estate and prisons in Wales.

== Senior personnel ==
Meilyr Rowlands was appointed as HM Chief Inspector of Education and Training in Wales on 1 June 2015, and succeeded by Owen Evans in January 2022.

The strategic directors are Simon Brown HMI and Claire Morgan HMI.

== See also ==
- Education in Wales
- Ofsted (England)
- Education Training Inspectorate (Northern Ireland)
- Education Scotland
