= Manston, Kent =

Village in Kent, England

Coordinates: 51.346°N 1.370°E

Manston
- War memorial and St Catherine's Church

- Location within Kent
- Interactive map of Manston
- Population: 1,138 (2011)
- OS grid reference: TR348662
- Civil parish: Manston
- District: Thanet
- Shire county: Kent
- Region: South East
- Country: England
- Sovereign state: United Kingdom
- Post town: Ramsgate
- Postcode district: CT12
- Dialling code: 01843
- Police: Kent
- Fire: Kent
- Ambulance: South East Coast
- UK Parliament: Herne Bay and Sandwich
- Website: Manston Parish Council

Manston is a village and civil parish in the Thanet district of Kent, England. The village is situated 1.5 miles (2.4 km) northwest of Ramsgate. The parish includes four hamlets and the former Manston Airport.

== Etymology ==
The village was originally Mannestone which means 'farm on top of a hill' (a possible alternative variation is a farm belonging to a man called Mann) and was recorded in 1254 as Manneston, but obtained its modern spelling in 1381 around the time of the Peasants' Revolt.

== History ==
The discovery of an Anglo-Saxon sword at what is known as the Ozengell burial ground and also 200 graves including a Roman stone and lead-lined coffin, never preserved, show that the site has been occupied for many centuries.

In June 1381 the Peasants' Revolt reached Manston.

"A proclamation in the name of Jack Straw and Wat Tyler ordered that labour services should not be performed nor distraints made, and called on the people to destroy the Manston house of William dea Medmenham [a local coroner who evidently acted as representative for St Augustine's and Catherine's], and if possible behead him. The same day a crowd some 200 strong attacked the house, burnt "the books and muniments" and "took away and burnt the rolls" to the value of 20 marks."

Two road names in the parish give clues to its past. Manston Court Road refers to Manston Court, the seat of the Manston family who held high office, including Richard de Manston at the time of King John (circa 1200) and William Manston, Sheriff of Kent in 1436; and Spratling Street gets its name from the Sprakling family who lived in Ellington in Ramsgate from 1558 to 1659, at a time when Manston was still a part of St Lawrence Extra.

Smuggling was rife in the Isle in the 17th and 18th centuries. Manston Cave, on the road towards Sandwich, was one of the smugglers' hideouts. Little of it now remains.

In 1901, the Isle of Thanet Poor Law Union opened a children's home at Manston. The homes comprised four pairs of houses and could accommodate a total of 120 children. In the 1901 census there were 46 inmates and the Superintendent was Edmund L Martins. One of the orphans, Frank Sidney Smith, an artist, painted a picture of Manston from memory in later life. This is now hanging in St Catherine's Church. The children's homes have now been converted to residential use. The orphanage's school is now the village hall.

During both World Wars the Manston area became important as an aircraft base, particularly in the Second World War as an airfield for emergency landings of damaged Allied bombers returning from the continent. The RAF Manston Museum tells the story of the air station.

The former RAF Manston became home to Kent International Airport, which closed in May 2014. Since 2022, the base has been in use as Manston arrivals and processing centre, an immigration detention centre for migrants who have crossed the English Channel.

== Governance ==
Manston Parish Council consists of seven members and holds its meetings in the RAF Museum.

== Geography ==
Manston Parish lies in the middle of the Isle of Thanet and includes the hamlets of Haine, Lydden, Woodchurch and Shottendane. A large part of it is agricultural land.

=== Climate ===
Climate data for Manston (1991–2020 normals, extremes 1961-)
Month	Jan	Feb	Mar	Apr	May	Jun	Jul	Aug	Sep	Oct	Nov	Dec	Year
Record high °C (°F)	16.4 (61.5)	17.9 (64.2)	22.5 (72.5)	24.6 (76.3)	29.6 (85.3)	35.4 (95.7)	36.2 (97.2)	34.6 (94.3)	31.0 (87.8)	28.7 (83.7)	18.2 (64.8)	15.9 (60.6)	36.2 (97.2)
Mean daily maximum °C (°F)	7.6 (45.7)	7.9 (46.2)	10.3 (50.5)	13.2 (55.8)	16.3 (61.3)	19.5 (67.1)	22.1 (71.8)	22.2 (72.0)	19.2 (66.6)	15.1 (59.2)	11.0 (51.8)	8.3 (46.9)	14.4 (57.9)
Daily mean °C (°F)	5.1 (41.2)	5.2 (41.4)	7.1 (44.8)	9.5 (49.1)	12.5 (54.5)	15.5 (59.9)	17.9 (64.2)	18.1 (64.6)	15.5 (59.9)	12.1 (53.8)	8.3 (46.9)	5.8 (42.4)	11.1 (52.0)
Mean daily minimum °C (°F)	2.6 (36.7)	2.5 (36.5)	3.9 (39.0)	5.8 (42.4)	8.7 (47.7)	11.4 (52.5)	13.7 (56.7)	14.0 (57.2)	11.9 (53.4)	9.1 (48.4)	5.6 (42.1)	3.2 (37.8)	7.7 (45.9)
Record low °C (°F)	−12.0 (10.4)	−14.5 (5.9)	−6.0 (21.2)	−4.6 (23.7)	−1.1 (30.0)	0.9 (33.6)	6.4 (43.5)	5.4 (41.7)	4.0 (39.2)	−3.1 (26.4)	−6.0 (21.2)	−8.8 (16.2)	−14.5 (5.9)
Average precipitation mm (inches)	51.2 (2.02)	41.0 (1.61)	36.1 (1.42)	37.8 (1.49)	47.6 (1.87)	46.5 (1.83)	47.4 (1.87)	50.7 (2.00)	48.8 (1.92)	73.7 (2.90)	69.3 (2.73)	62.6 (2.46)	612.6 (24.12)
Average precipitation days (≥ 1.0 mm)	10.9	9.7	7.9	7.9	8.3	7.6	7.1	8.1	7.6	11.3	11.7	11.9	110.1
Mean monthly sunshine hours	65.6	84.1	134.5	195.8	230.8	235.4	242.7	225.3	172.2	122.3	77.3	60.0	1,846
Source 1: Met Office
Source 2: Starlings Roost Weather

== The village ==
St Catherine's Church was built in 1872 with monies raised by locals as a Chapel of ease for those of the St Lawrence Parish who were unable to attend the church in St Lawrence. The land was donated by the Vicar of St Lawrence, Rev. G. W. Sicklemore. There is a war memorial on the village green to those who served and died in the two world wars of the twentieth century.

The village pub is The Jolly Farmer, located in what was in 1672 part of a pair of farm dwellings, and originally registered as a public house in November 1738 by Lazarus Haywood under the name "Jolly Farmers". It was leased to its first tenant Keeper, Samuel Packer (a boot and shoe maker from Ramsgate) in March 1739. During the Second World War the Jolly Farmer was a favourite of pilots stationed at RAF Manston. It was rumoured that many of the pilots signed their names on the ceiling of 'the snug', but this has been painted over and so the rumour is unverifiable. The licensee from 1957 to 1980 was the footballer Bert Turner.

There is an active village hall with its own committee, used during elections as a polling station; and two caravan parks: Preston Parks (statics) and Manston Court.

The erstwhile post office and village store is now closed: the post box bearing the mark of GR is all that remains. There is flourishing Garden Club.

== Transport ==
Kent International Airport (formerly RAF Manston), located near the village, closed in May 2014. Thanet Parkway railway station, situated 1 mile (1.6 km) south of the village, opened in July 2023.
