= Manston arrivals and processing centre =

Migrant processing centre in England

- Interactive map of Manston arrivals and processing centre
- Location: Manston, Kent, United Kingdom; 51.351226°N 1.349685°E
- Status: Open
- Opened: February 2022

Manston arrivals and processing centre is a centre used for the processing of migrants who have crossed the English Channel, located on the former site of RAF Manston in Manston, Kent, United Kingdom. Opened in February 2022, it was intended to house around 1,000 to 1,600 people for less than 24 hours at a time, though by autumn 2022 it housed over 4,000 people at a time for up to 33 days.

The site is located three miles inland from Ramsgate, and is largely hidden from public view. As of August 2023, outsourcers operating at the site included Management and Training Corporation, Mitie and Interforce. It accommodates both adults and children, featuring a family section which includes facilities for parents with babies and toddlers.

== History ==
=== 2022: Opening and autumn crisis ===
The centre opened in January or February 2022 as a direct response to the influx of people arriving across the English Channel in small boats. It was initially designed to hold 1000 people, or 1600 people at maximum capacity, for less than 24 hours at a time. Improved weather for Channel crossings led to increasing arrivals, which then led to conditions in the centre quickly deteriorating by that summer.

In the autumn of 2022, over 4,000 migrants were staying at the centre, with hundreds being detained for up to 33 days longer than the legal 24-hour limit and guards being sourced from private security firms. Many were held in wedding marquees. This influx led to overcrowding and a resultant spread of diseases including diphtheria, of which there were 50 cases, as well as scabies and MRSA. Local officials had raised issues with the Home Office concerning infection control a week before the outbreak. Then-chief inspector of borders and immigration David Neal visited the site in October; he wrote that people were sleeping on the dirty floors of the marquees to sleep, that toilets were overflowing with faeces, that there was inadequate medical care access, and that new arrivals were referred to by a wristband number instead of by their name.

On 29 October The Times reported that then home secretary Suella Braverman had received advice at least three weeks prior that migrants were being detained for unlawfully long periods at Manston, that they urgently needed to be rehoused in alternative accommodation, and that the matter could result in a public inquiry. It further reported that Braverman refused to secure new hotels for the asylum seekers, which Braverman disputed. On 30 October, an incendiary device attack on the Western Jet Foil processing centre led to a total of 700 people being moved from that centre to Manston. On 1 November, a group of 11 asylum seekers from Manston were left at London Victoria station without accommodation or warm clothing. Braverman visited the centre on 3 November, arriving by military helicopter, and made a statement that steps were being taken to "immediately" improve the centre's situation. On 4 November, the government stated that over 1,200 people had been moved from Manston in the past four days, reducing numbers at the centre to 2,600. Home Office contractors were disciplined the same day after asylum seekers at Manston complained that security staff were attempting to smoke cannabis and also sell the drug to them.

On 19 November, Hussein Haseeb Ahmed, a 31-year-old man from Iraq who had been staying at the processing centre and who had contracted diphtheria, died after being taken to hospital the previous day. He had travelled to the UK as part of a small boat crossing on 12 November. 18,000 people, of a total of 29,000 processed between June and November 2022, were unlawfully detained at Manston for longer than 24 hours. Additionally, Home Office staff had no reliable data on the site between September and November. On 22 November, it was announced that the site had been cleared of people being held there, and all residents were placed in temporary accommodation.

From 25 to 28 November, a delegation of seven people from the Council of Europe’s Prevention of Torture and Inhuman or Degrading Treatment or Punishment Committee (CPT) made a rare “rapid reaction” visit to the site. The Kent Coast Independent Monitoring Board had additionally made visits to monitor Manston throughout October and November. 44 charities, including the Refugee Council, Save the Children and the International Rescue Committee, signed a letter to The Guardian calling for a "Windrush"-style independent inquiry on 29 November. On 30 November The Guardian reported that the centre was thought to again be operational.

=== 2023–2024: Management contracts, mural removal, investment, and inquiry ===
In June 2023, Management and Training Corporation signed a contract to provide services at the detention centre until July 2024. At the time, the contractor had 211 staff in a variety of roles including security, helping medical teams deliver assessments and operating some residential units.

In July 2023, immigration minister Robert Jenrick ordered the removal of children's murals at Kent Intake Unit in Dover as well as at Manston; these, which included Anna from the movie Frozen and cartoon robins, and which had previously been praised in a His Majesty's Inspectorate of Prisons report, were painted over at both sites on 4 July by the Ministry of Justice’s estates team. A Freedom of Information request revealed that the painting over of the Manston murals cost the Home Office £1,549.52. Jenrick said he regretted the order the next year.

In December 2023, the Home Office stated it had earmarked at least £700 million for commercial partners at immigration facilities, including Western Jet Foil and National Reception Centre at Manston. This included the construction of "permanent, purpose-built facilities" at Manston, and extensive "wrap-around" catering, security and medical support services. A report by the Independent Monitoring Boards in October found that three Home office processing centres for small boat arrivals, Manston, Western Jet Foil and KIU, identified “serious concerns about the conditions in which people were being held, particularly at Manston”.

In December 2023, the High Court granted former detainees of the centre permission to seek a judicial review of the Home Office not launching an inquiry into the centre. In March 2024, the Home Office announced it would launch an inquiry into the mistreatment of asylum seekers at the centre, though did not state who would lead the inquiry. The Guardian reported in July that the Children’s Commissioner for England, Rachel de Souza, was to visit Manston, citing concerns over how children were processed there, some of whom had been processed as adults despite being children. In September, new home secretary Yvette Cooper downgraded the statutory inquiry to an independent inquiry, citing its £26 million cost, estimated to decrease to £2.6 million with the independent inquiry, as a reason. A legal challenge against this led to government documents on Manston being disclosed in the high court in November, as well as several of the asylum seekers who were held there coming forward about their experiences.

In October 2024, the UK government advertised a six-year £521 million contract to manage both the Manston Reception Centre and Western Jet Foil, with an option to extend the contract a further four years.

== See also ==
- English Channel migrant crossings (2018–present)
- Immigration detention in the United Kingdom
- Modern immigration to the United Kingdom
