= Independent Chief Inspector of Borders and Immigration =

Government official in the United Kingdom

- Incumbent; John Tuckett since 3 October 2025
- Home Office
- Type: Appointment
- Reports to: Home Secretary
- Appointer: Home Secretary
- Term length: 3 years

The Independent Chief Inspector of Borders and Immigration, formerly the Independent Chief Inspector of the UK Border Agency, is a government appointed official responsible for providing independent scrutiny of the UK's border and immigration functions such as the Border Force. The role of the Independent Chief Inspector was established by section 48 of the UK Borders Act 2007. In 2009, the Independent Chief Inspector's remit was extended to include customs functions and contractors.

On 26 April 2009, the Independent Chief Inspector was also appointed to the statutory role of independent Monitor for Entry Clearance Refusals without the Right of Appeal as set out in section 23 of the Immigration and Asylum Act 1999, as amended by section 4(2) of the Immigration, Asylum and Nationality Act 2006.

The Independent Chief Inspector works to ensure scrutiny of the UK's border and immigration functions, providing confidence and assurance as to their effectiveness and efficiency. The Chief Inspector is completely independent and reports directly to the Home Secretary. The Chief Inspector does not investigate individual cases. The resulting reports can be robust in their criticism of the Border Force formally UK Border Agency.

== List of former Independent Chief Inspectors of Border and Immigration ==
- John Vine (7 July 2008 - 19 December 2014)
- David Bolt (1 May 2015 - 21 March 2021)
- David Neal (22 March 2021 - 20 February 2024)
- David Bolt (Interim appointment, 24 May 2024 - 2 October 2025)
