= No one is illegal =

Political slogan

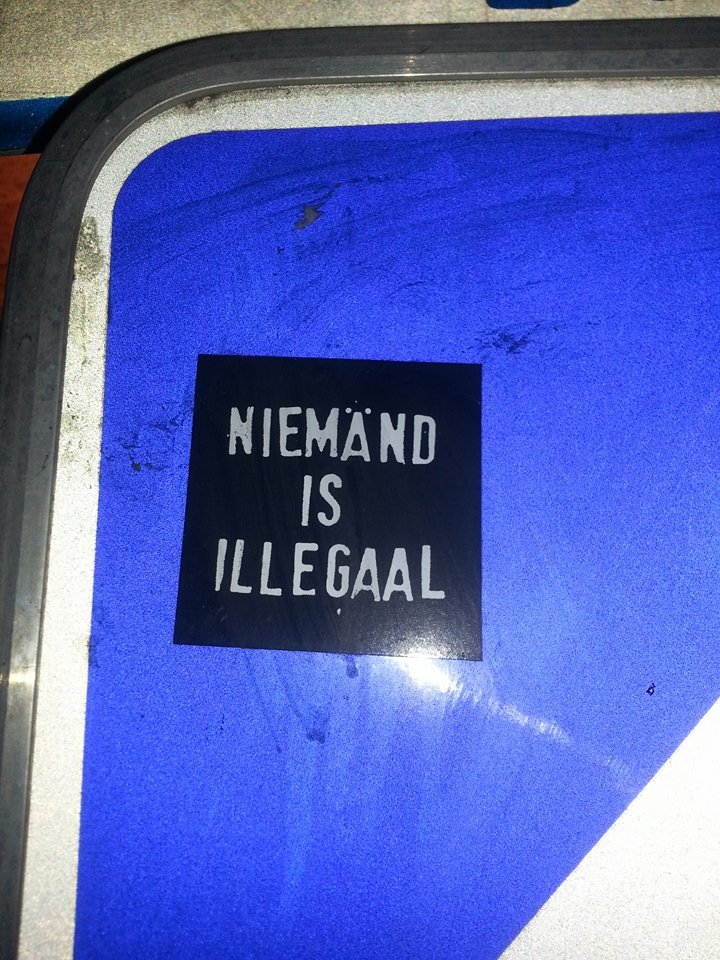
A sticker bearing the slogan in Dutch

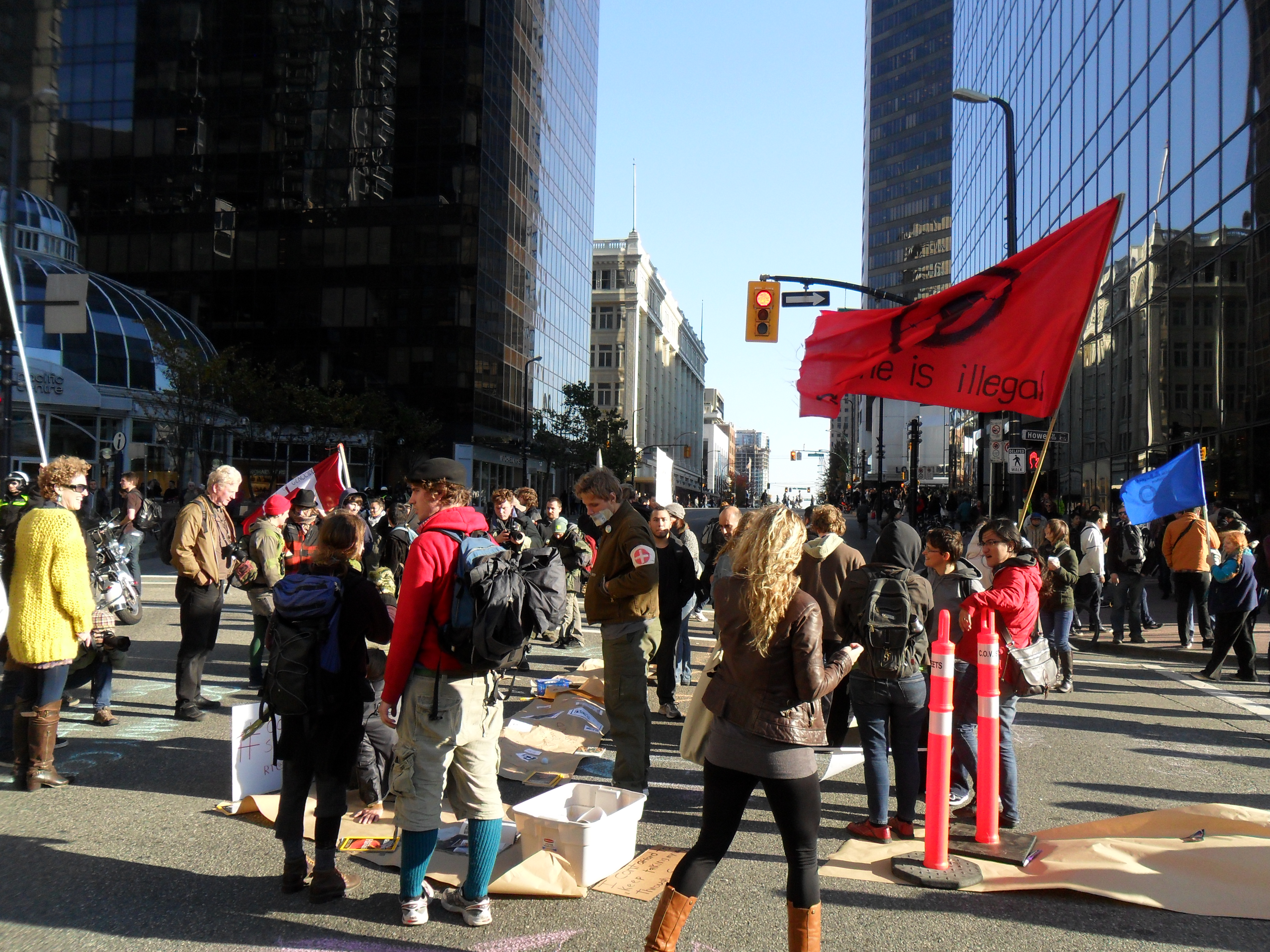
A protestor waving a flag with the slogan at Occupy Vancouver, 2011

No one is illegal is a loosely connected international network that advocates for refugees and migrants present in a country unlawfully. Activists in the network take initiatives in favor of undocumented migrants who stay in a country illegally and are at risk of deportation. The network has started a campaign and held rallies to bring wider attention to the situation of refugees. The campaign initially began in Germany as No Person Is Illegal (German: Kein Mensch ist illegal or kmii) and has spread to other countries, including Canada and Belgium. "No one is illegal" questions the idea of citizenship as a legal condition for access to and participation in the socio-political sphere.

== Germany ==
=== History ===
The first use of the phrase is attributed to Nobel laureate and Holocaust survivor Elie Wiesel in 1988, who used "No Human Being Is Illegal" on a flyer at the "National Campaign for the Civil and Human Rights of Salvadorans".

No Person Is Illegal was founded in 1997 at the "documenta X" art exhibition in Kassel. After a few weeks, thousands of individuals joined as well as the 200 groups and organisations that had joined them in appealing to "help immigrants begin and continue their journeys towards obtaining work and documentation, medical care, education and training, and to assure accommodation and physical survival" regardless of their immigration status. The founding followed the death of deportee Aamir Ageeb at the hands of the German Federal Police. In the wake of Ageeb's death, the "Deportation-Class" campaign set its aims towards airlines that took part in deportations. The campaign culminated in a 2001 online demonstration in conjunction with Libertad. No Person Is Illegal and "Deportation-Class" have drawn the attention of Germany's "Annual Report on the Protection of the Constitution" due to purported connections with "left-wing extremism".

== Switzerland ==
Switzerland Bildung für Alle (Education for All) organization has its own specific task which is attempting to achieve permanent legal stay for immigrants. The organization founded the Autonomous School Zurich, a grassroots project that offers schooling for all, run by immigrants as well as Swiss locals.

== Canada ==
A NOII collective of organizations has been established in a number of Canadian cities, including Winnipeg, Vancouver, Toronto, Halifax, Fredericton, Ottawa, Montreal (where Jaggi Singh has been associated), and London. Activist Harsha Walia is an organizer for the Vancouver chapter, while Yanisa Wu, Kelly Campbell, Sherry Viloria, Evan Macintosh, Jayelyn Rae, Hazim Ismail, and Mitchell van Ineveld organize for the Winnipeg chapter.

== Belgium ==
In Bruges, there is a volunteer collective called "Niemand is Illegaal" (No One Is Illegal). This organization provides humanitarian aid to displaced people mainly residing in northern France informal camps. Their activities include collecting and distributing clothing, tents, tarpaulins, cooking equipment and hygiene products, often in collaboration with Mobile Refugee Support. Niemand is Illegaal Brugge is entirely volunteer‑run and financed through donations, merchandise sales and community fundraising events. Members also give talks in schools and public forums or through other activities to raise awareness about the living conditions of refugees.

The collective operates a mobile shower installation known as the Badmobiel, a van equipped with showers that offers people in the camps basic facilities for washing. There was also an art auction for the benefit of the Badmobiel project.

The creation of 2 beers (Migraantje and Mihranout) was a temporary one of their solidarity initiative to finance humanitarian aid.

== United States ==
=== No one is illegal on stolen land ===
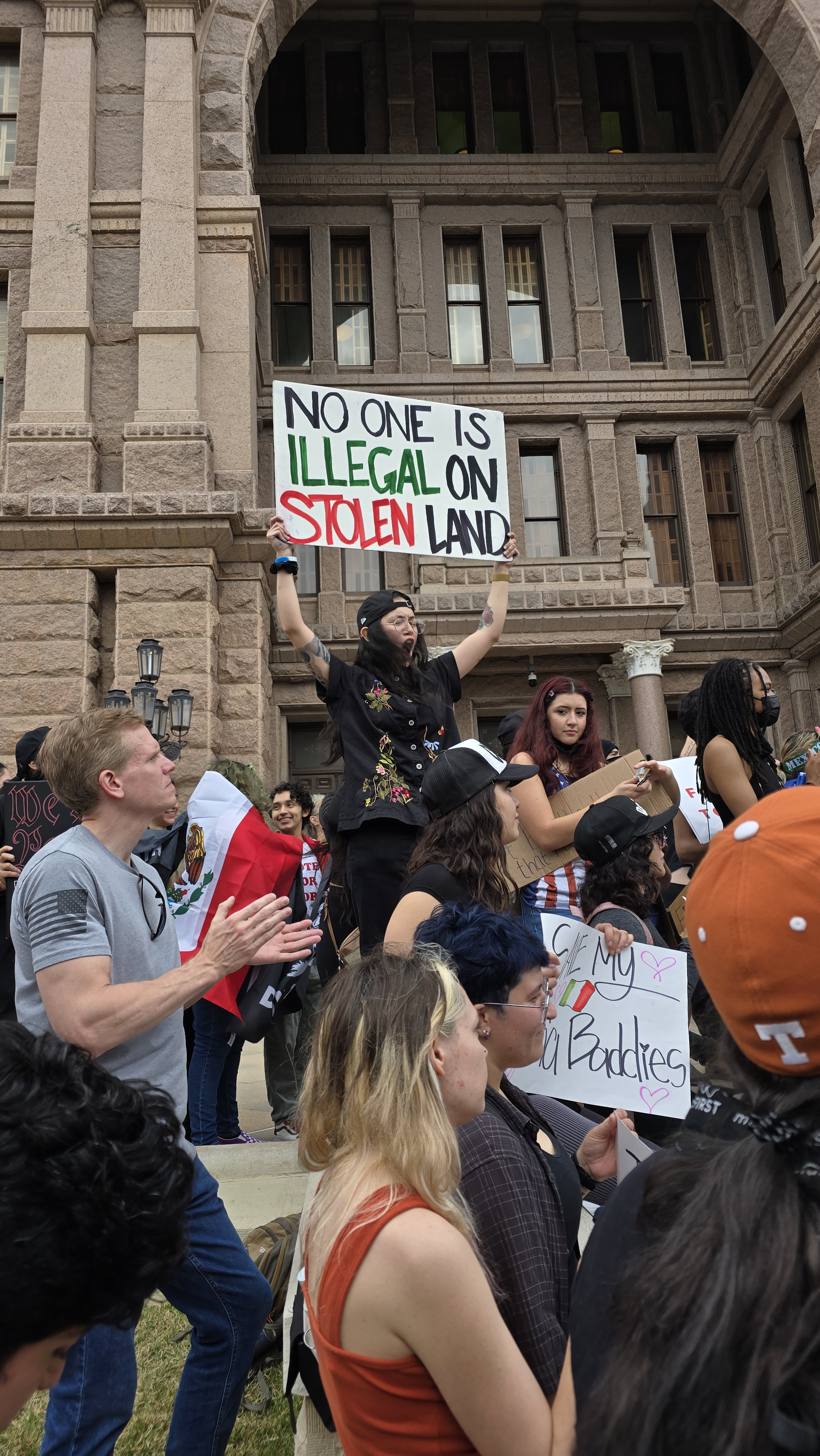
A banner bearing the slogan

The motto first appeared in 2018 on T-Shirts sold by Amazon. The next year, indigenous people organized an event near detention center in McAllen, Texas, holding banners with the slogan. It is not clear whether the motto partly derived from the earlier European and Canadian versions or is a case of independent appearance from movements of indigenous people. They stressed that part of the migrants from Latin America are their relatives and by the right of their indigenous American ancestry should be legal to live everywhere in the Americas. The original T-Shirt with the motto displays the image of native American. American ancestry, however, is not explicit in the slogan. As formulated, it immediately applied to the whole of humanity. The "human being" of Wiesel reappeared and was inserted into the native American version: "No Human Being is Illegal on Stolen Land". Though many present nations originated as colonies, as of 2025 the device remained unique to the United States. The slogan received a mighty boost when Billie Eilish announced it in the 2026 Grammy award. Opponents of the idea launched a massive retaliation, ranging from personal demand from Eilish to hand over her mansions which happen to be on the tribal land to historical analysis of the claim.

== See also ==
- Criminalization of migration
- Free migration
- Open borders

== Bibliography ==
- AutorInnenkollektiv (2000): Ohne Papiere in Europa. Illegalisierung der Migration. Selbstorganisation und Unterstützungsprojekte in Europa. ISBN 3-924737-49-5
- cross the border (Hg.) (1999): kein mensch ist illegal. Ein Handbuch zu einer Kampagne. ISBN 3-89408-087-6
- Gerda Heck: ›Illegale Einwanderung‹. Eine umkämpfte Konstruktion in Deutschland und den USA. Edition DISS Band 17. Münster 2008. ISBN 978-3-89771-746-6
- Thomas, Jens (10 November 2008). "Geschlossene Gesellschaft". Telepolis.
