= Jaggi Singh (activist) =

Canadian activist

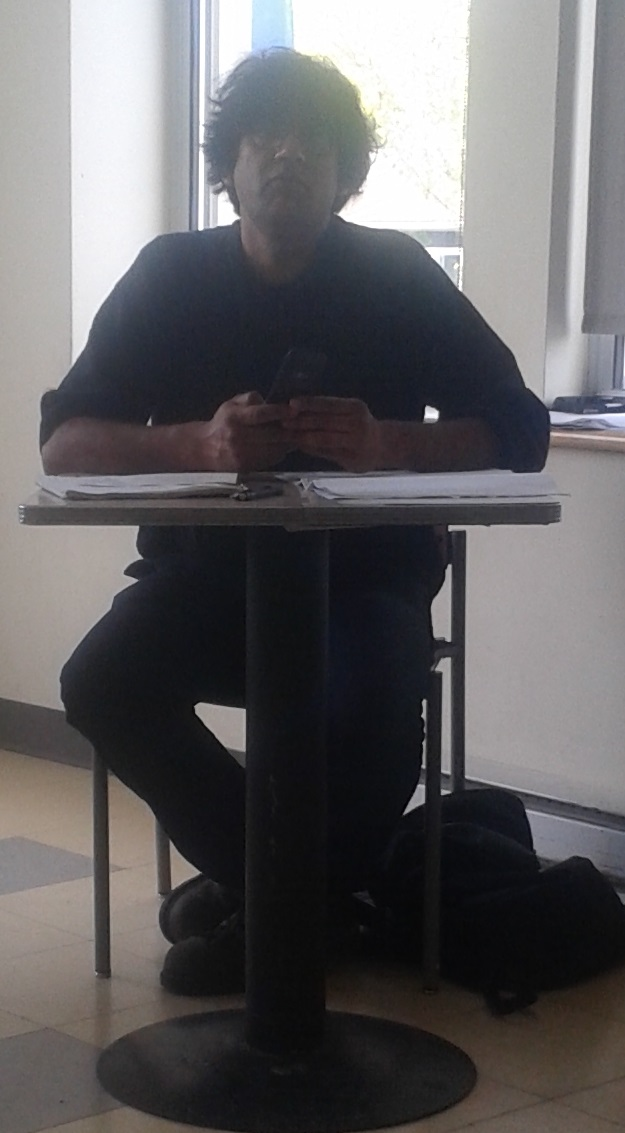
- Singh in 2018
- Born: Toronto, Ontario
- Education: University of Trinity College; University of Toronto
- Known for: Activist, anarchist

Jaggi Singh is a Canadian anti-globalization, social justice, and anarchist activist. Singh has worked with Montreal based groups such as Solidarity Across Borders and No one is illegal collective.

== 1997 APEC summit ==
Singh was active in the protests outside the 1997 APEC conference held in Vancouver. According to Canadian Member of Parliament, Svend Robinson, the day before the summit started: "Jaggi Singh, one of the organizers of the APEC alert ... [was] arrested, wrestled to the ground on the UBC campus by three plainclothes police officers, handcuffed, thrown in the back of an unmarked car with tinted glass, driven off and locked up during the APEC summit." Singh was charged with assault after allegedly yelling into the ear of a campus security guard with a megaphone and spent the duration of the conference in jail. In February 1999, the assault charge was dropped by Crown prosecutors before going to trial.

Singh was one of 51 people to file a complaint against the conduct of the Royal Canadian Mounted Police (RCMP) at the APEC summit that sparked a formal investigation by the Commission for Public Complaints Against the RCMP. In March 2000, he was one of three people to formally withdraw from the inquiry, alleging that Prime Minister Jean Chrétien's rejection of an invitation to testify before the Commission was proof that the process was flawed.

In one of the findings condemning RCMP behavior issued in the final report by the Commission, it was noted that: "Mr. Jaggi Singh was arrested on a warrant based on a spurious charge; the manner of his arrest was inappropriate in the circumstances; the timing of the arrest was calculated to prevent him from attending protests on November 25; the bail conditions sought were overly restrictive."

== G-20 & the Quebec City Summit of the Americas ==
Singh continued to attend Canadian rallies and protests, and continued to face arrests. In October 2000, he was arrested at a G-20 protest in Montreal, and charged with "participation in a riot", illegal assembly, and mischief. Police claimed that Singh’s speech against the International Monetary Fund incited the crowd, and that he announced the availability of medical help while riot police were charging at the crowd. In April 2003, he was acquitted of the riot charges.

Singh gained notoriety as the longest-detained demonstrator arrested by police at the Quebec City Summit of the Americas. Witnesses reported that, "he was grabbed from behind by police masquerading as protesters" and "dragged away in a beige van". Singh was held for a total of 17 days, and charged with breaking conditions from previous arrests and with weapons charges - for a catapult that launched teddy bears that was actually constructed and operated by an unrelated group from Edmonton, which released a satirical statement denying Singh's involvement with the catapult. He was released on $3,000 bail with conditions that prohibited him from leading or organizing any demonstrations or using a megaphone.

In a telephone interview conducted while he was in the Orsainville jail near Quebec, Singh explained his view that legal action against him and other political activists was designed to intimidate them into silence, and split them off from mainstream public opinion:

"Everybody is an idealist. Everybody has this idea that things should be better and that's really a non-ideological thing. The fear is that those idealists will become radicals and start questioning the roots of the system, start questioning the power structure. People in power don't like that. You have to turn these idealists into realists, because once they're realists, they can accept the compromises that opportunists make; those being the politicians.

And how do you turn an idealist into a realist instead of a radical? Well, a baton blow to the head is one way. Getting wafts of tear gas is another. Yet another is making the radicals seem crazy and criminal. Give the distinct impression through the media that you will be jailed. You will be treated differently and it's not worth the trouble. As long as idealists stay that way, or even better become realists or opportunists, that's great."

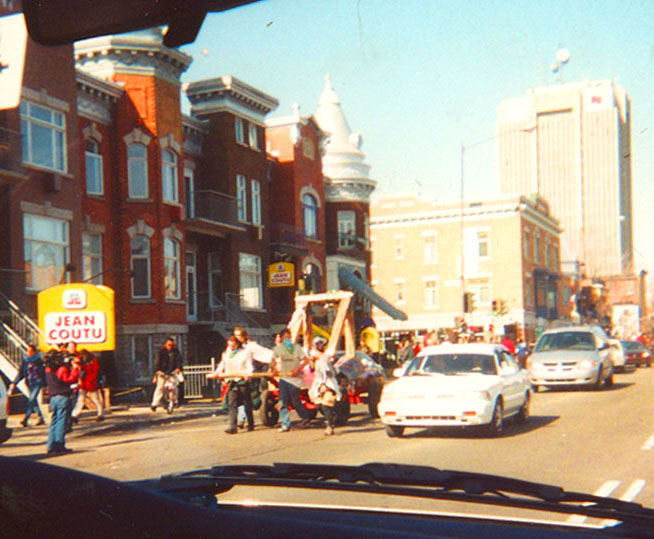
Protesters carrying a catapult at the Quebec City Summit of the Americas

During the lengthy pre-trial process, the weapons charge was dropped, and Singh’s request in November 2003 for a stay of proceedings based on "unreasonable delay and abuse of process," was accepted two months before the case would have gone to trial in January 2004. In his ruling, Judge Beaulieu of the Quebec Superior Court agreed with Singh’s position that: "... the bail conditions imposed on May 2001 have restrained his right to freedom, opinion, expression and the right of freedom of association as protected by article 2 of the Canadian Charter of Rights and Freedoms."

== Pro-Palestinian activism ==
Singh was also known for his pro-Palestinian activism and for organizing protests in and around Montreal.

On September 9, 2002, he participated in a protest against a speech by Israeli Prime Minister Benjamin Netanyahu which was to be presented by the pro-Israel Hillel club at Concordia University, with support from the Asper Foundation. The talk was canceled when confrontations between protestors, police and security agents became violent, resulting in widespread coverage in the media, including an article in The Globe and Mail written by Singh himself.

In January 2003, Singh was deported by Israeli authorities after having gone to the West Bank on an invitation from the International Solidarity Movement. He had initially been denied entrance to the country upon his arrival in December 2002, but fought the decision in court. Though he won the right to stay for three weeks, he was barred from visiting the West Bank. Singh refused to abide by the order and made public his reasons for doing so, writing: "It's not for an occupying power to decide who can or can't enter Palestine... I've decided then to ignore the Israeli security services and listen to the Palestinian activists. It was an easy choice to make." On January 8, 2003, Singh was nabbed by undercover police officers in Jerusalem. He was held at the Russian Compound and then the Maasiyahu Prison, before being deported back to Canada.

On January 20, 2003, Singh was to speak at a demonstration in support of students facing disciplinary charges for the September 9 protest against Benjamin Netanyahu. He was arrested on university campus by police and charged with illegal assembly, obstruction, mischief, assault, conspiracy and breaking prior conditions, for the September 9 protest.

Singh mounted his own defense and filed an abuse of process motion after the prosecution failed to disclose more than 30 unedited videos taken by surveillance cameras the day of the protest. He put it to the court that the videos showed inconsistencies with the evidence given by security guards and supported his version of events. In his ruling, Montreal Municipal Court Judge Pierre Fontaine wrote that the Concordia University Administration had exhibited "gross negligence" that amounted to a "flagrant violation" of Singh's right to a fair trial. The dismissal of the charges at that time meant that Singh enjoyed his first totally clean judicial record in years.

The Crown successfully appealed Judge Fontaine's decision and the charges were reinstated. In his judgement rendered on August 23, 2006, Superior Court of Quebec Judge James Brunton wrote: "the trial judge erred when he held that officials of Concordia University were grossly negligent in not volunteering the production of the videocassettes before receiving a subpoena duces tecum during the motion hearing. My reading of the transcripts leads me to the exact opposite conclusion. Officials of Concordia were exemplary in their co-operation with the prosecution and the Court. They were exemplary in their dealings with the Respondent during the hearing of the motion."

On April 19, 2006, Singh was attending a pro-Palestinian poetry-reading/music fundraising event, organized by Sumoud at the El Salon cafe, when he was arrested by Montreal police. Reports conflict as to what happened exactly. Police say they were responding to an allegation of assault reported by a "taxi driver" outside the cafe. They say they attempted to question Singh about the alleged assault and pursued him inside the cafe to do so, but that many of the 70 people in attendance attempted to obstruct them. Singh says the man who police say was a taxi driver was wearing a suit and driving an unmarked SUV. He says that the man pushed him after Singh asked him what he was doing parked on the side of the road wearing an earpiece. Police ended up charging Singh and one other person with obstruction, and three others were given municipal fines.

== Media portrayal in the United States ==
In 2004, the New York Daily News drew reference to Singh in an article about protesters against the Republican National Convention. The article incorrectly spoke of Singh receiving firearms training from Kazi Toure and that the teddy-bears launched of the Quebec Summit of the Americas had been soaked in gasoline. At the same time, the New York Post published a photo of someone they alleged to be Singh shooting off a handgun.

Singh claimed that he did not throw himself into the spotlight due to an awareness of how the media likes to develop cults of personality: "I didn't choose to be covered in the way I have been. I've said no to interviews far more often than I've said yes." In 2001, when the CBC's The Fifth Estate aired a documentary profile of Singh, it was difficult to get his cooperation. Anna Maria Tremonti, the show's host, noted that "Often, people clamour to get in front of a microphone. But Jaggi didn't clamour."

Singh does acknowledge that not all his dealings with the media have been bad: "There are some journalists who are willing to take time on a story. That doesn't mean days, it just means making a couple of calls and getting all the background information so the story is not exploitative."

He was interviewed and included in a PBS documentary # Commanding Heights: about the global political economy.

== Other activism ==
=== Civil liberties & Montreal Police tactics ===
Singh provided an "activist arrest and trial calendar" to the United Nations International Covenant on Civil and Political Rights in support of a complaint filed by La Ligue des droits et libertés, outlining heavy-handed Montreal police tactics that had resulted in 2,000 arrests between 1999 and 2004. In November 2005, the UN body's report singled out Montreal police for the disproportionate use of mass arrests, stating: "The State party should ensure that the right of persons to peacefully participate in social protests is respected, and ensure that only those committing criminal offences during demonstrations are arrested ... The Committee also invites the State party to conduct an inquiry into the practices of the Montreal police forces during demonstrations, and wishes to receive more detail about the practical implementation of article 63 of the Criminal Code relating to unlawful assembly." Singh cited the results of the report as a vindication for Montreal activists: "The report validates what protesters have been saying about these protests, that these mass arrests are essentially a tactic by Montreal police to prevent by fear the involvement of young people who take to the streets in protest."

=== Migrant rights advocacy ===
In talks at Concordia University and McGill University of Montreal, Singh has outlined the links between global apartheid and the work of groups like No One Is Illegal towards protecting the rights of refugee claimants in Canada and migrants around the world. He has said that, "You can't define human beings as illegal, as exploitable [or] as non-status." He has also criticized the high bar for refugee status in Canada saying that, "You have to prove that there is a gun to your head or there will be a gun to your head," in order to be allowed to stay.

Singh also took part in a protest of Immigration Minister Monte Solberg's speech at the annual meeting of Citizens for Public Justice in 2006, demanding a moratorium on all deportations of refugees. He was one of about a dozen protestors whose presence was cited as a disruption of the event, and which resulted in Solberg cancelling his speech and leaving the hall.

=== Protesting Canadian involvement in the War in Afghanistan ===
On November 24, 2006, Singh was arrested yet again and charged with violating earlier bail conditions for taking part in a 15-person protest against Canadian involvement in the war on Afghanistan at a press conference convened by Canadian Prime Minister Stephen Harper at the Montreal General Hospital.

The arresting officer’s report stated that the RCMP asked Singh to leave based on his reputation as a political dissident and that he was arrested for refusing to leave after being asked to by hospital security.

At the bail hearing, the prosecution argued for denial of bail on the basis that Singh’s history of arrests made it likely that he would re-offend. In his defense, Singh stated that, "I was targeted not for what I did, but for my reputation," and further pointed out that he had won five of the six cases previously brought against him.

Singh submitted that, "Standing up and asking a question is not illegal. Standing up and challenging the Prime Minister’s policies is not illegal."

Municipal Court Judge Pascal Pillarella ruled that Singh had not actually violated the conditions of his earlier bail and should not have to spend months in jail awaiting trial. Singh was released on $2000 bail, and his trial for charges including obstruction and assault was scheduled for May 2007.

=== International Women's Day 2007 ===
On March 8, 2007, Singh attended a demonstration for International Women’s Day in Montreal where he was again arrested by police. He was held in jail for five days. At the bail hearing, police contended that Singh violated a bail condition prohibiting him from attending illegal or non-peaceful demonstrations. Several witnesses, including a Cégep professor and a medical resident at the Montreal Children’s Hospital, testified that the women’s day march had been peaceful. He was released on $1000 bail. The judge commented that the "hefty bond" might work to deter Singh’s activism.

A judge ruled that the protest was declared 'unpeaceful' by police only in order to arrest Singh. The Quebec Court of Appeals upheld a lower Superior Court decision that ordered two Montreal police officers to pay Singh $15,000, and $1,000 in damages.

=== G-20 Toronto 2010 ===
In June 2010, Singh participated in the protests during the G-20 Summit in Toronto. According to immigrant rights group No one is illegal, Singh turned himself into Toronto police following the issuance of an arrest warrant. He was granted bail on July 12, after $10,000 was paid by two sureties, one of which was the Québec provincial deputy Amir Khadir, from the Québec Solidaire Party. In addition to this bail, $75,000 more, guaranteed this time by Amir Khadir and two other people whose identities were not revealed, will be charged if Singh breaks his release conditions, which are the following: house arrest at the home of one of the guarantors; handing in his passport to the authorities; he must not use a cellular phone; he must not have any contact with the 16 other activists charged with conspiracy in connection with the G20 protests.
