= PICUM =

PICUM (the Platform for International Cooperation on Undocumented Migrants) is a non-governmental organization located in Brussels that aims to promote social justice and respect for the human rights of undocumented migrants within Europe. It provides a direct link between the grassroots level, where undocumented migrants' experience is most visible, and the European level, where policies relating to them are discussed and implemented.

PICUM also seeks to dialogue with organizations and networks with similar concerns in other parts of the world. PICUM currently represents an independent network of 160 member organisations working with undocumented migrants in 32 countries, primarily in Europe as well as in other global regions.

== History ==
The initiative to establish PICUM was taken in the late 1990s by grassroots organisations from Belgium, the Netherlands, and Germany, that provided support to undocumented people.

As national asylum policies became more and more Europeanised, these organisations found that there was a real vacuum regarding the humanitarian concerns of undocumented people at the European policy level. They decided to set up a platform to advocate for the rights of undocumented people at the EU level and ensure that the EU's migration policy is in line with Member States' obligations under regional and international human rights standards.

PICUM's office opened in November 2000 in Brussels.

== Activities ==
PICUM ’s activities are focused in four main areas:

- Monitoring and reporting: improving the understanding of issues related to the protection of the human rights of undocumented migrants;
- Capacity-building: developing the capacities of NGOs and other involved actors to advance the human rights of undocumented migrants;
- Advocacy: influencing policy makers to include undocumented migrants in social and integration policies on the national and European levels;
- Awareness-raising: promoting and disseminating the values and practices underlying the protection of the human rights of undocumented migrants

=== Areas of work ===
PICUM’s main areas of work include:

- Access to justice
- Children and youth
- Detention and returns
- Healthcare
- Housing
- Labour
- Women

=== 'Words Matter' campaign ===
PICUM has also been advocating to change the narrative around migration and undocumented migrants, by raising awareness about the impact of terminology and language on the lives of undocumented people. With its "Words Matter" campaign, PICUM intends to move away from the term "illegal migrant" and promote the use of the terms "undocumented" or "irregular" as the organization believes using the word "illegal" implies criminality, is applied in a discriminatory way, and contributes to dehumanize this population.
