= Autonomous School Zurich =

Coordinates: 47.384742°N 8.534069°E

- Autonome Schule Zürich
- Abbreviation: ASZ
- Formation: 2009
- Founder: Association "Education for All" (Bildung für Alle)
- Type: Grassroots project
- Legal status: Non-profit
- Purpose: Education and cultural activities for all, including undocumented migrants
- Location: Zurich, Switzerland
- Region served: Canton of Zurich
- Methods: Voluntary teaching, cultural events, community meals
- Volunteers: 100+
- Website: www.bildung-fuer-alle.ch

Autonomous School Zurich (ASZ, Autonome Schule Zürich in German) is a grassroot project in Switzerland. This school is run by immigrants as well as Swiss locals. Since 2009 the association "Bildung für Alle" provides education for all under the shelter of the Autonomous School Zurich. On offer are diverse educational and cultural activities for everyone both for undocumented refugees, the socially excluded and all other interested people.

== Autonomous school as educational and cultural hotspot ==
Autonomous School is a unique meeting point. People from all over the world play an active role. Among the courses on offer are German, Spanish, Arabic, Mathematics, English, Yoga and Computing courses like Java programming and Gimp. The school organizes dances like capoeira. There is a wide range of cultural activities (concerts, bar, cinema, etc.) and the tri-weekly community dinner aimed at integrating rejected asylum seekers. There are theatre and drama performed by members of the school in conjunction with other actors from other institutions.

The project is dedicated to further the emancipation process of the sans-papier (undocumented migrant) groups and demand legal status. ASZ's funding is dependent on donations.

Other similar autonomous school projects are run in Biel/Bienne, Bern, St. Gallen, Winterthur and Frauenfeld (all in Switzerland) and Butare (Rwanda).

== History ==
The Association "Education for All" occupied a church in December 2008 to push home the need for German courses for the sans-papiers. A squatted house at Manessestrasse with a lot of space dedicated to workshops called itself "Autonomous School Zürich" and hosted "Education for All" from then on. After the eviction of the location Bad Allenmoos, the two became a joint project. Started in 2009, the ASZ grew continuously and today hosts (March 2017) up to seven courses simultaneously, with over 500 weekly participants, 15 active working-groups, and over 100 volunteer activists moderating courses and organizing the school.

Since 2010, a group of ASZ-activists has been working on a platform called Openki that helps organize the courses, reduces barriers to participation and interconnects a variety of like-minded organizations.

Since 2010, ASZ has published a yearly print newspaper called "Papierlosezeitung". Since 2013, it has been distributed by the newspaper WOZ.

== Locations ==
ASZ is located at Sihlquai 125. Before that its facility was always precarious: ASZ moved at least 11 times in Canton Zurich:

1. Manessestrasse
2. Infoladen/Kasama
3. Kalki
4. GZ Wollishofen
5. Bad Allenmoos
6. Gessenerallee/Stall6
7. Badenerstrasse
8. Hubertus
9. Rote Fabrik
10. PANAMA (Güterbahnhof)
11. Badenerstrasse
12. Bachmattstrasse
13. Sihlquai 125
