= Illegal immigration =

Entry into a country without any legal right

Illegal immigration is the migration of people into a country in violation of that country's immigration laws, including unauthorized entry or continued residence after the expiration of a valid visa. Illegal immigration tends to be financially upward, with migrants moving from poorer to richer countries. Unauthorized residence can carry risks of detention, deportation, or other administrative sanctions, depending on national laws.

Some migrants, including asylum seekers, are legally protected from penalties under international law. Under Article 31 of the 1951 Refugee Convention and its 1967 Protocol, people who enter a country without authorization to seek asylum cannot be penalized solely for irregular entry if they present themselves promptly, and are lawfully allowed to remain until their cases are fully processed. Asylum seekers denied asylum may face impediment to expulsion if the home country refuses to receive the person or if new asylum evidence emerges after the decision. In some cases, these people are considered illegal aliens. In others, they may receive a temporary residence permit, for example regarding the principle of non-refoulement in the International Refugee Convention. The European Court of Human Rights, referring to the European Convention on Human Rights, has shown in a number of indicative judgments that there are enforcement barriers to expulsion to certain countries, for example, due to the risk of torture.

== Terminology ==
In Europe, the Platform for International Cooperation on Undocumented Migrants (PICUM) launched its international "Words Matter" campaign in 2014 to promote the use of the terms undocumented or irregular migrants instead of illegal. Depending on jurisdiction, culture, or context, alternatives to illegal aliens or illegal immigrants can include irregular migrants, undocumented immigrants, undocumented persons, and unauthorized immigrants, and sans-papiers (paritcularly when lacking a permit authorizing residency). In some contexts, the term illegal immigrants is shortened, often pejoratively, to illegals. Irregular migration is a related term that is sometimes used, e.g. by the International Organization for Migration; however, because of the word migration, this term describes a somewhat wider concept, including illegal emigration.

=== News media ===
Some news associations have in their style guide discontinued or discouraged the term illegal immigrant, except in quotations. These organizations presently include the Associated Press (US), Press Association (UK), European Journalism Observatory, European Journalism Centre, Association of European Journalists, Australian Press Council, and Media, Entertainment and Arts Alliance (AU). Most commonly they use the alternative term undocumented immigrant. Related terms that describe actions are not similarly discouraged. For example, the Associated Press continues to use the term illegal immigration, whereby illegal describes the action rather than the person.

On the other hand, The New York Times described undocumented immigrant as a "term preferred by many immigrants and their advocates, but it has a flavor of euphemism and should be used with caution outside the quotation". Newsweek questions the use of the phrase undocumented immigrants as a method of euphemistic framing, namely, "a psychological technique that can influence the perception of social phenomena". Newsweek also suggests that persons who enter a country unlawfully cannot be entirely "undocumented", as they "just lack the certain specific documents for legal residency and employment", while "[m]any have driver's licences, debit cards, library cards, and school identifications which are useful documents in specific contexts but not nearly so much for immigration". For example, in the US, youths brought into the country illegally are granted access to public K-12 education and benefits regardless of citizenship status; therefore the youths are not entirely undocumented, since they are documented for educational purposes.

=== US government ===
Title 8 of the US Code is the portion of United States law that contains legislation on citizenship, nationality, and immigration. Defining the legal term alien as "any person, not a citizen or national of the United States", The terminology used in Title 8 includes illegal alien (33 times), unauthorized alien (21 times), undocumented alien (18 times), illegal immigrant (6 times), undocumented person (2 times), and others. An analysis by PolitiFact concluded that the term illegal alien "occurs scarcely, often undefined or part of an introductory title or limited to apply to certain individuals convicted of felonies".

In the United States, while overstaying a visa is a civil violation handled by the immigration court, entering (including re-entering) the US without approval from an immigration officer is a crime; specifically a misdemeanor on the first offense. Illegal reentry after deportation is a felony offense. This is the distinction between the larger group referred to as unauthorized immigrants and the smaller subgroup referred to as criminal immigrants.

Democratic Senator and Senate Majority Leader Chuck Schumer has spoken out against the term undocumented, stating that "Illegal immigration is wrong – plain and simple" and that proponents of the term were "not serious" about combatting illegal immigration. During President Joe Biden's term, government websites used the term "non-citizen" instead of "alien". This change was reversed in January 2025 after President Donald Trump returned to office.

=== Canadian government ===
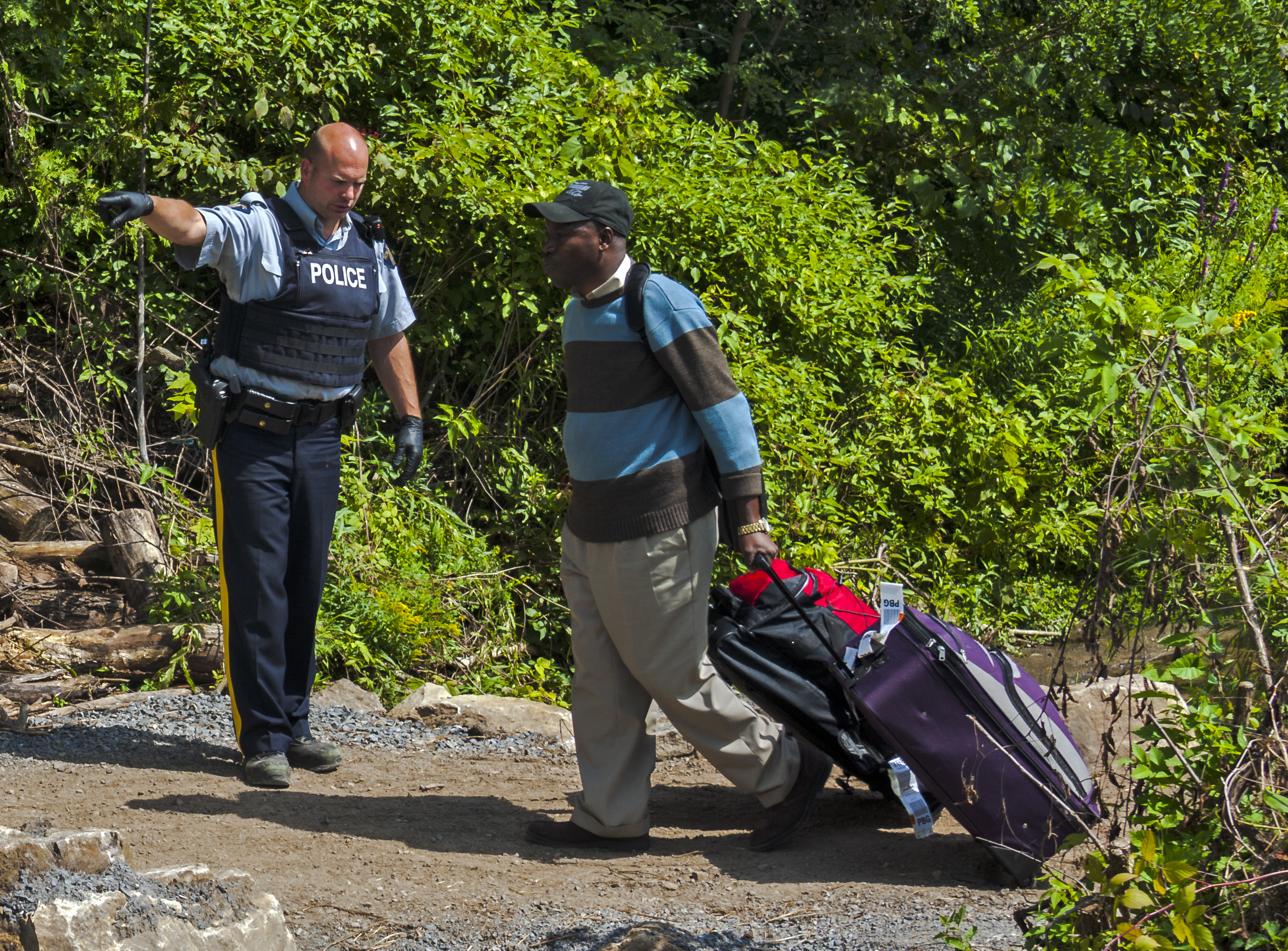
An asylum seeker that has illegally crossed from the United States to Canada is being detained.

In Canada, as in the US, illegal immigrant is a commonly used term; however, there is confusion and deep dissent among many about what the term means under the law and what circumstances, and what it implies socially. Irregular is a term used by government authorities to refer to migrants who enter Canada outside of official border crossings ("points of entry"). Entrance into Canada outside of a POE is considered unlawful but not a criminal offence, or a civil offence under the Immigration and Refugee Protection Act, SC 2001, c. 27.

The government of Canada, as well as the Immigration and Refugee Board, use the term irregular to refer to these crossings. The Liberal Party of Canada and the New Democratic Party typically use the term irregular, while the Conservative Party of Canada typically uses the term illegal. The use of the term undocumented is increasingly prevalent among individual MPs and MLAs in Canada, and was also used in a NDP policy document, as well as by Ontario NDP leader Andrea Horwath in a 2018 platform document. Conservative MP Dave Epp referred to "undocumented workers" in a 2020 interview with the CBC wherein he called for an end to the use of contract migrant labour by Canadian agriculture businesses, in part because many such workers are undocumented and therefore vulnerable to exploitation and unsafe working conditions.

== Reasons for illegal immigration ==
=== Poverty ===
Some examples do show that increases in poverty, especially when associated with immediate crises, can increase the likelihood of illegal migration. The 1994 economic crisis in Mexico, after the start of the North American Free Trade Agreement (NAFTA), was associated with widespread poverty and a lower valuation for the peso relative to the dollar. It also marked the start of a massive swell in Mexican immigration, in which net illegal migration to the US increased every year from the mid-1990s until the mid-2000s. There are also examples where natural disasters and population growth can amplify poverty-driven migration flows.

=== Gender violence ===
Many leave their country fleeing gender-based violence, such as honor crime or forced marriage, especially from conflicts area. Women in illegal situations are especially at risk of sexual exploitation or rape.

=== Family reunification ===
Some illegal immigrants seek to live with relatives who already live in a country that they are not allowed to enter, such as a spouse or other family members. Having a family who has immigrated or being from a community with many immigrants is a much better predictor of one's choice to immigrate than poverty. Family reunification visas may be applied for by legal residents or naturalized citizens to bring their family members into a destination state legally, but these visas may be limited in number and subject to yearly quotas. This may result in family members entering illegally to reunify. From studying Mexican migration patterns, Douglas Massey finds that the likelihood that a Mexican national will emigrate illegally to the US increases dramatically if they have one or more family members already residing in the United States, legally or illegally.

=== Asylum ===
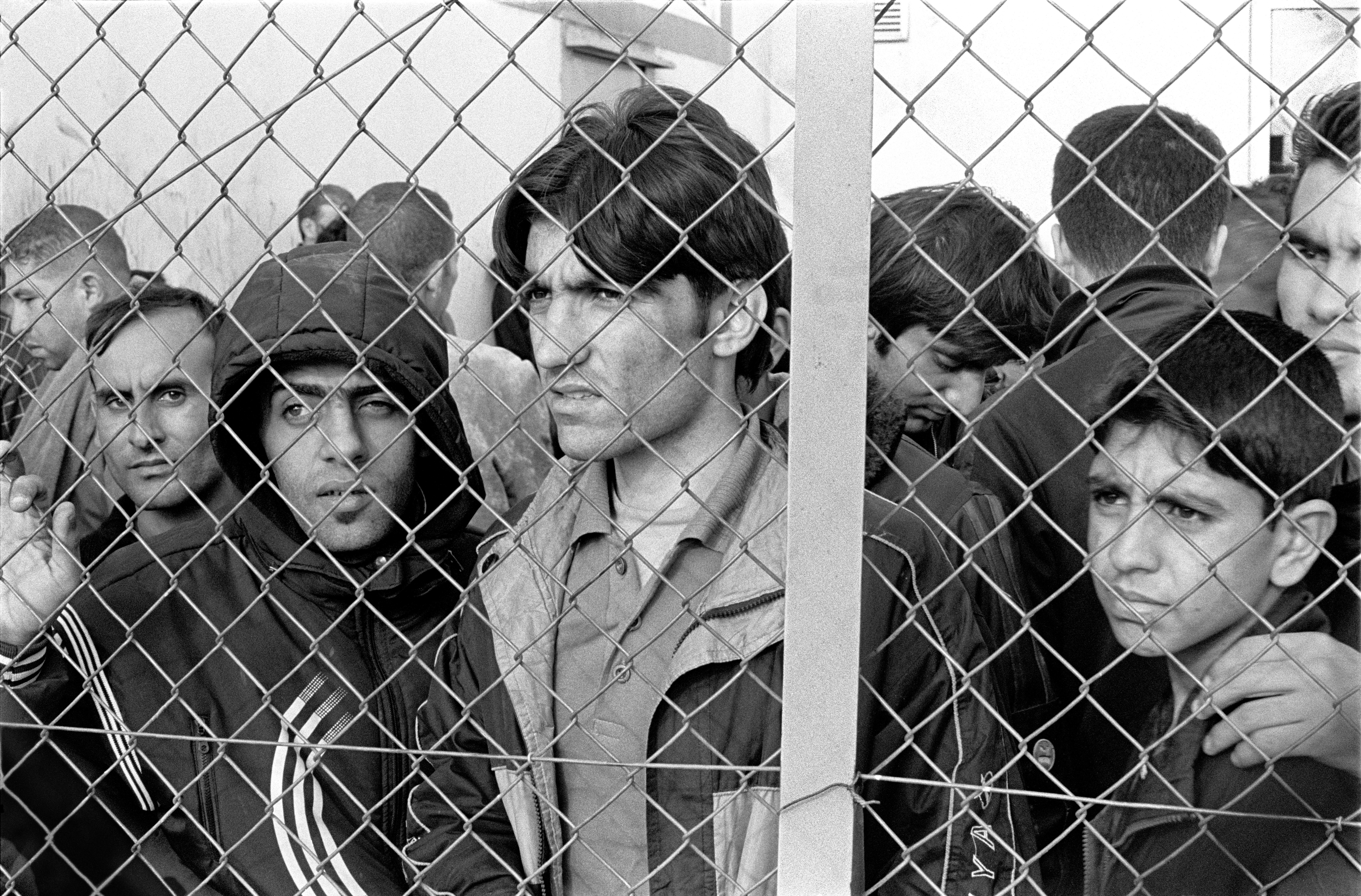
Arrested refugees/immigrants in Fylakio detention centre, Evros, northern Greece

Unauthorised arrival into another country may be prompted by the need to escape civil war or repression in the country of origin. The Universal Declaration of Human Rights upheld by the United Nations guarantees the right of asylum, and as such, asylum seekers are typically treated differently from illegal immigrants. In practice, however, many asylum seekers are subjected to exceedingly long waiting periods, isolated and unsafe detention facilities, and a high probability of being denied. This has led some authors to suggest that the ideal of asylum has eroded in recent years in the Global North. According to the 1951 Refugee Convention refugees should be exempted from immigration laws and should expect protection from the country they entered.

=== Deprivation of citizenship ===
In a 2012 news story, the CSM reported, "The estimated 750,000 Rohingya, one of the most miserable and oppressed minorities in the world, are deeply resentful of their almost complete absence of civil rights in Myanmar. In 1982, the military junta stripped the Rohingya of their Myanmar citizenship, classing them as illegal immigrants and rendering them stateless." In some countries, people born on national territory (henceforth not "immigrants") do not automatically obtain the nationality of their birthplace, and may have no legal title of residency.

=== Persecution ===
With a pattern of persecution of Christians in Iran, Iranian converts to Christianity from Islam face the death penalty. Peyman Malaz, chief operating officer of the PARS Equality Center, noted that "Those who arrive at the [Mexico–United States] border are often the most persecuted and desperate, such as Iranian Christians". Matthew Soerens, US director of Church Mobilization for World Relief, noted that in 2024, "30,000 of the 100,000 refugees resettled in the US were Christians fleeing persecution." If deported back to Iran, converts to Christianity from Islam face the death penalty given the pattern of persecution of Christians there.

=== Education ===
Families want to have better lives for their children and to succeed. The article "Learning to be Illegal" discusses the safety the children have in K-12 schooling. The children are guaranteed education in a safe environment.

== Effects of illegal immigration ==
Aside from illegal immigration status, illegal immigration is related to other effects.

=== Illegal employment ===
The employment of aliens, which is illegal under US law, has been found to be enabled by low employer sanctions and rare law enforcement in particular for subcontractors and gig economy. The search for employment is central to illegal international migration.

=== Exploitation of labour ===
Illegal employment makes it easier for corporations to take advantage of wage labour. If an employer does not maintain proper safety standards, refuses to pay, or creates overall precarious working conditions, looking for remedies or redress would also mean the risk of having to disclose illegal immigration status. Employers sometimes pay less than the legal minimum wage or have unsafe working conditions, relying on the reluctance of illegal workers to report the violations to the authorities. Another consequence on labor is the lack of regulations and fairness programs leading to an increased barrier to employment for women or handicapped persons. Unfair and unjust, the exploitation of illegal immigrants' labor can go unpunished.

According to data from the US Census Bureau, illegal immigrants in the United States often work in dangerous industries such as agriculture and construction. A recent study suggests that the complex web of consequences resulting from illegal immigrant status limits illegal workers' ability to stay safe at work. In addition to physical danger at work, the choice to immigrate for work often entails work-induced lifestyle factors which impact the physical, mental and social health of immigrants and their families.

==== Slavery ====
Research at San Diego State University estimates that there are 2.4 million victims of human trafficking among illegal Mexican immigrants in the United States. Some workers are smuggled into the United States and Canada by human traffickers. People have been kidnapped or tricked into slavery to work as laborers, after entering the country, for example in factories. Those trafficked in this manner often face additional barriers to escaping slavery, since their status as illegal immigrants makes it difficult for them to gain access to help or services. For example, Burmese women trafficked into Thailand and forced to work in factories or as prostitutes may not speak the language and may be vulnerable to abuse by police due to their illegal immigrant status.

==== Sexual exploitation ====
Since the fall of the Iron Curtain, Western Europe is being confronted with a serious problem related to the sexual exploitation of illegal immigrants (especially from Eastern Europe), for prostitution. In the United States, human trafficking victims often pass through the porous border with Mexico. To curb the spread of sex slavery and other predation on unauthorized immigrants, then California Attorney General Kamala Harris and Mexico Attorney General Marisela Morales Ibáñez signed an accord in 2012 to expand prosecutions of criminals typically members of transnational gangs who engage in the trafficking of human beings between the two countries.

=== Economy and labor market ===
Research on the economic effects of illegal immigration is scant, but existing studies suggest that the effects can be positive for the native population, and for public coffers. One 2015 study states that "increasing deportation rates and tightening border control weakens low-skilled labor markets, increasing unemployment of native low-skilled workers. Legalization, instead, decreases the unemployment rate of low-skilled natives and increases income per native." This is because the presence of illegal immigrants reduces the labor costs of employers, providing them more opportunities to create more jobs. A 2013 study by the liberal think tank Center for American Progress found that granting citizenship to people who immigrated illegally would boost the US economy: doing so would raise the incomes of illegal immigrants by a quarter (increasing US GDP by approximately $1.4 trillion over a 10-years); a 2016 study found that "legalization would increase the economic contribution of the unauthorized population by about 20%, to 3.6% of private-sector GDP"; and a 2019 working paper by the University of Cyprus found that "all types of immigrants generate a larger surplus to US firms than natives do".

According to economist George Borjas, immigrants may have caused the decline of real wages of US workers without a high school degree by 9% between 1980 and 2000 due to increased competition. Other economists, such as Gordon Hanson, criticized these findings. Douglas Massey argues that developed countries need unskilled immigrant labor to fill undesirable jobs, which citizens do not seek regardless of wages. Massey argues that this may refute claims that illegal immigrants are "lowering wages" or stealing jobs from native-born workers and that it instead shows that illegal immigrants "take jobs that no one else wants". A paper by Spanish economists found that, upon granting work permits to the illegal immigrant population in Spain, the fiscal revenues increased by around €4,189 per newly legalized immigrant. The paper found that the wages of the immigrants increased after receiving work permits. At the same time, some low-skilled natives had worse labor market outcomes and high-skilled natives had improved labor market outcomes.

Since the decline of working-class blue-collar jobs in manufacturing and industry, younger native-born generations have acquired higher education. In the US, only 12% of the labor force has less than a high school education, but 70% of illegal workers from Mexico lack a high school degree. Support for this claim can be seen in a Pew Hispanic Center poll of over 3,000 illegal immigrants from Mexico in the US, which found that 79% would voluntarily join a temporary worker program that allowed them to work legally for several years but then required them to leave. From this, it is assumed that the willingness to take undesirable jobs is what gives undocumented immigrants their employment. Evidence for this may be seen in the average wages of illegal day laborers in California, which was between $10 and $12 per hour according to a 2005 study, higher than many entry-level white-collar or service jobs.

Research indicates that the advantage to firms employing illegal immigrants increases as more firms in the industry do so, further increases with the breadth of a firm's market, and also with the labor intensity of the firm's production process; however, the advantage decreases with the skill level of the firm's workers, meaning that illegal immigrants do not provide as much competitive advantage when a high-skilled workforce is required.

=== Lack of access to services ===
Illegal immigrants usually have no or very limited access to public health systems, proper housing, education and banks. For instance, the current international human rights framework stipulates in various documents that the right to health and access to healthcare is fundamental and independent of a person's legal status. However, on a domestic level, many States in Europe have established the right to health as a welfare right, making it subject to citizenship or other administrative requirements. Whether it's due to the danger behind disclosing their status or because of the inherently unfair social infrastructures, these barriers are present in all types of services, from social security to health.

=== Incentivising dangerous migration routes ===
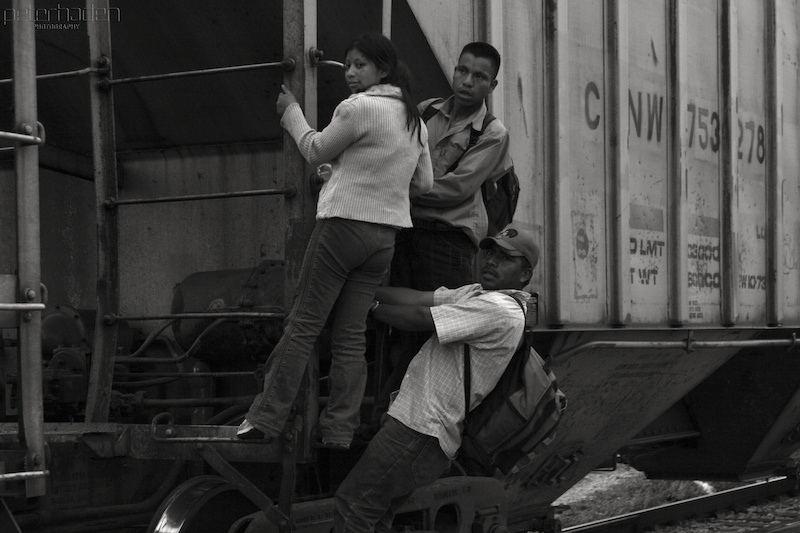
Migrant family freighthopping in southern Mexico from Central America

Each year, there several hundred migrant deaths along the Mexico–United States border are reported, as immigrants cross the border illegally. Death by exposure occurs in the deserts of Southwestern United States during the hot summer season. In 2016, there were approximately 8,000 migrant deaths, with about 63% of deaths occurring within the Mediterranean. In some regions, people that are still en route to their destination country are also sometimes kidnapped, for example for ransom. In some instances, they are also tortured, raped, and killed if the requested ransom does not arrive. One case in point is the Eritrean migrants that are en route to Israel. A large number of them are captured in North Sinai (Egypt) and Eastern Sudan and held in the buildings in North Sinai.

== Methods ==
=== Illegal border crossing ===
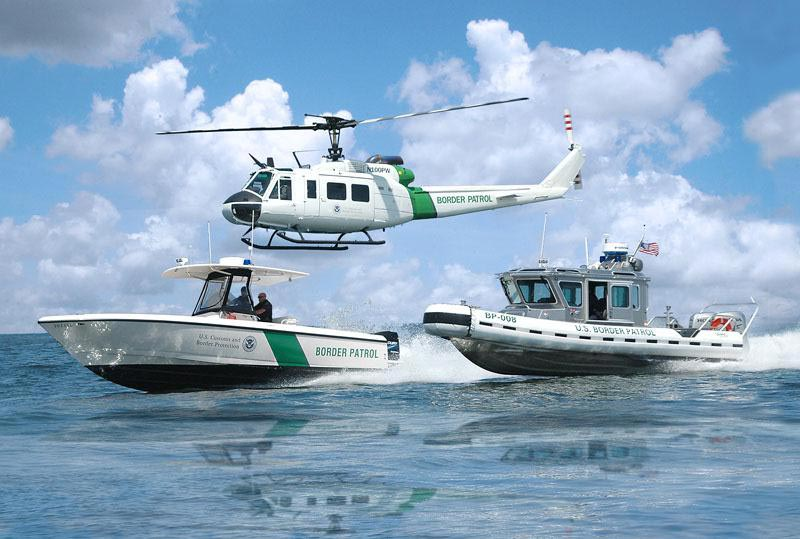
Border patrol at sea by the US Customs and Border Protection

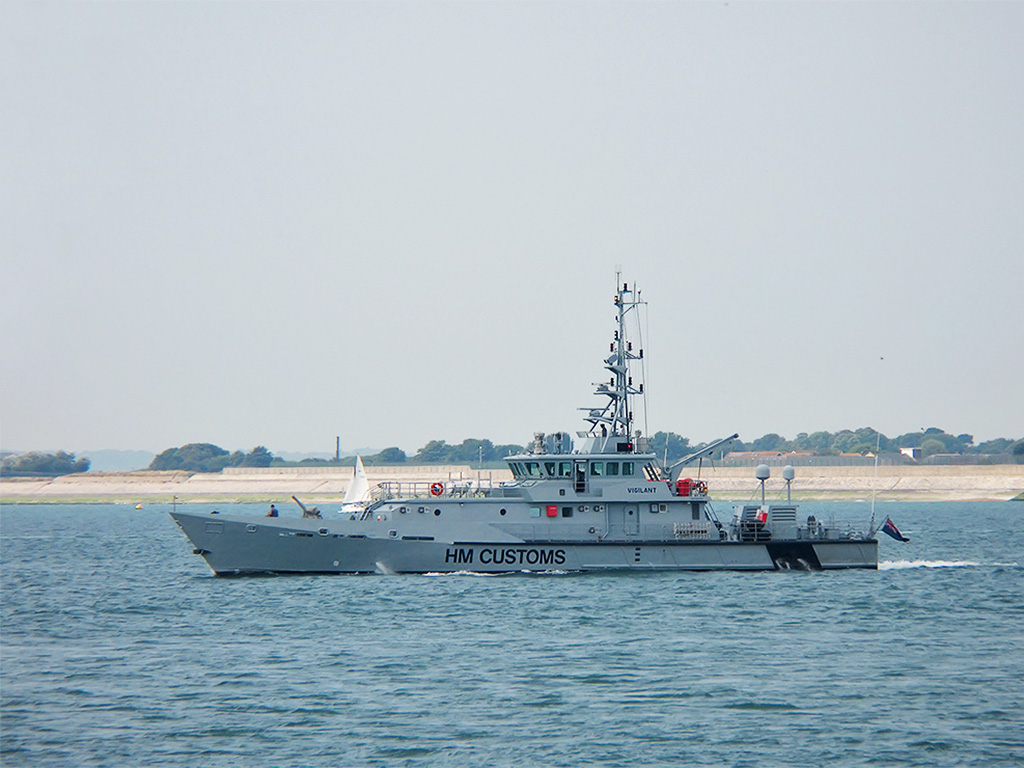
HMC Vigilant, one of several customs cutters of the UK Border Force, and capable of speeds up to 26 knots, departing Portsmouth Naval Base

Immigrants from countries that do not have automatic visa agreements, or who would not otherwise qualify for a visa, often cross the borders illegally in some areas such as the Mexico–United States border, the Mona Channel between the Dominican Republic and Puerto Rico, the Strait of Gibraltar, Fuerteventura, and the Strait of Otranto. Because these methods are illegal, they are often dangerous. Would-be immigrants have been known to suffocate in shipping containers, boxcars, and trucks, sink in shipwrecks caused by unseaworthy vessels, die of dehydration, or exposure during long walks without water. An official estimate puts the number of people who died in illegal crossings across the US–Mexican border between 1998 and 2004 at 1,954. Human smuggling is the practice of intermediaries aiding illegal immigrants in crossing over international borders for financial gain, often in large groups. Human smuggling differs from but is sometimes associated with human trafficking. A human smuggler will facilitate illegal entry into a country for a fee, but on arrival at their destination, the smuggled person is usually free. Trafficking involves a process of using physical force, fraud, or deception to obtain and transport people. Types of notorious human smugglers include Snakehead gangs present in mainland China (especially in Fujian) that smuggle laborers into Pacific Rim states (making Chinatowns frequent centers of illegal immigration) and "coyotes", who smuggle illegal immigrants to the Southwestern United States and have been known to abuse or even kill their passengers.

=== Overstaying visa ===
Many illegal immigrants are migrants who originally arrive in a country lawfully but overstay their authorized residence (overstaying a visa). For example, most of the estimated 200,000 illegal immigrants in Canada (perhaps as high as 500,000) are refugee claimants whose refugee applications were rejected but who have not yet been expelled from the country. Another example is formed by children of foreigners born in countries observing jus soli ('right of territory'), such as was the case in France until 1994 and in Ireland until 2005. In these countries, it was possible to obtain French or Irish nationality (respectively) solely by being born in France before 1994 or in Ireland before 2005 (respectively). At present, a French born child of foreign parents does not automatically obtain French nationality until residency duration conditions are met. Since 1 January 2005, a child born in Ireland does not automatically acquire Irish nationality unless certain conditions are met.

=== Sham marriages ===
Some people enter into sham marriages, whereby marriage is contracted into for purely immigration advantage by a couple who are not in a genuine relationship. Common reasons for sham marriages are to gain immigration (i.e., immigration fraud), residency, work, or citizenship rights for one or both of the spouses or other benefits. In the United Kingdom, those who arrange, participate in, or officiate over a sham marriage may be charged with several offenses, including assisting unlawful immigration and conspiracy to facilitate a breach of immigration law. The United States has a penalty of a $250,000 fine and five-year prison sentence for such arrangements. The US Immigration and Customs Enforcement (ICE) and the Justice Department say that they do not have accurate numbers on the rate of attempted marriage fraud. In the 2009 fiscal year, 506 (0.2%) of the 241,154 petitions filed were denied for suspected fraud; 7% were denied on other grounds.

== Legal protections and exceptions ==
Not all unauthorized immigration are subject to penalties, and many countries provide legal protections or give temporary status for certain categories of irregular residents.

=== Asylum seekers ===
Individuals entering a country without authorization with the purpose to seek asylum are protected by international law, notably Article 31 of the 1951 Refugee Convention and its 1967 Protocol. These laws stipulate that asylum seekers cannot be penalized for unauthorized entry if they present themselves promptly and are permitted to reside lawfully until at least their cases are fully processed. Per European Court of Human Rights under the European Convention on Human Rights, they cannot be illegally returned to countries where they face persecution, torture, or inhuman treatment, under the principle of non-refoulement. However, some individuals may attempt to misuse this pathway through fraudulent claims.

=== Family-based protections ===
Many countries, such as the US, limit or defer the removal of unauthorized residents who are close family members of citizens or long-term residents to protect family unity or prevent undue hardship. This may include parents, spouses, or children of citizens, and can allow exception from penalties and temporary legal residence or deferred removal.

=== Temporary or humanitarian status ===
Legal exceptions from deportation and penalties can be made for Temporary Protected Status, deferred action, or similar forms of humanitarian relief for unauthorized immigrants that arrived from countries affected by conflict, natural disaster, or other emergencies. Programs often permit such irregular residents to remain lawfully for a defined period and may include work authorization. In the US, Temporary Protected Status allows individuals who were previously unauthorized to obtain legal, temporary status but the pathway in itself does not lead to permanent residence (Green Card). However TPS holders who qualify for asylum, may still apply for asylum to attain permanent residence status.

=== Pathways to regularization ===
In many jurisdictions, temporary or protected residence that began with unauthorized entry can, under specific, lawful criteria, provide a pathway to permanent residency and, eventually, citizenship. This pathway is generally not automatic and illustrates that certain unauthorized residence does not necessarily equate to criminality or deportation, at least until the individual's status is fully resolved under the applicable legal process.

== By country or region ==
=== Africa ===
==== Angola ====
In 2007 around 44,000 Congolese were forced to leave Angola. Since 2004, more than 400,000 illegal immigrants, almost all from the Democratic Republic of the Congo, have been expelled from Angola.

==== South Africa ====
No accurate estimates of the number of illegal migrants living in South Africa exist. Estimates that have been published vary widely. A 1996 Human Sciences Research Council study estimated that there were between 2.5 million and 4.1 million illegal migrants in the country. In their 2008–09 annual report, the South African Police Service stated, "According to various estimates, the number of undocumented immigrants in South Africa may vary between three and six million people." Other estimates have put the figure as high as 10 million. As of April 2015, Statistics South Africa's official estimate is between 500,000 and one million undocumented migrants. A large number of Zimbabweans have fled to South Africa as a result of instability in Zimbabwe, with many living as illegal migrants in South Africa. Sociologist Alice Bloch notes that migrants in South Africa have been the victims of xenophobia and violence, regardless of their immigration status.

=== South to East Asia ===
==== Bangladesh ====
In 2018, there were 1.1 million illegal Rohingya Muslims in Bangladesh. There are about 1.2 million Indians living in Bangladesh illegally as of 2014. By contrast, there are at least 20 million Bangladeshi illegal immigrants (20–40 times more) living in India, making India the country with the largest number of illegal immigrants in the world. There is a significant number of Burmese illegal immigrants in Bangladesh. As of 2012, the Bangladesh government estimated about 500,000 illegal Burmese immigrants living across Bangladesh.

==== Bhutan ====
Immigration in Bhutan by Nepalese settlers (Lhotshampa) began slowly towards the end of the 19th century. The government passed the Bhutanese Citizenship Act 1985 to clarify and try to enforce the Bhutanese Citizenship Act 1958 to control the flood of illegal immigration. Those individuals who could not provide proof of residency prior to 1958 were adjudged to be undocumented immigrants. In 1991 and 1992, Bhutan expelled roughly 139,110 ethnic Nepalis, most of whom have been living in seven refugee camps in eastern Nepal ever since. The United States has offered to resettle 60,000 of the 107,000 Bhutanese refugees of Nepalese origin now living in U.N. refugee camps in Nepal. The Bhutanese government, even today, has not been able to sort out the problem of giving citizenship to those people who are married to Bhutanese, although they have been in the country for 40 years.

==== India ====
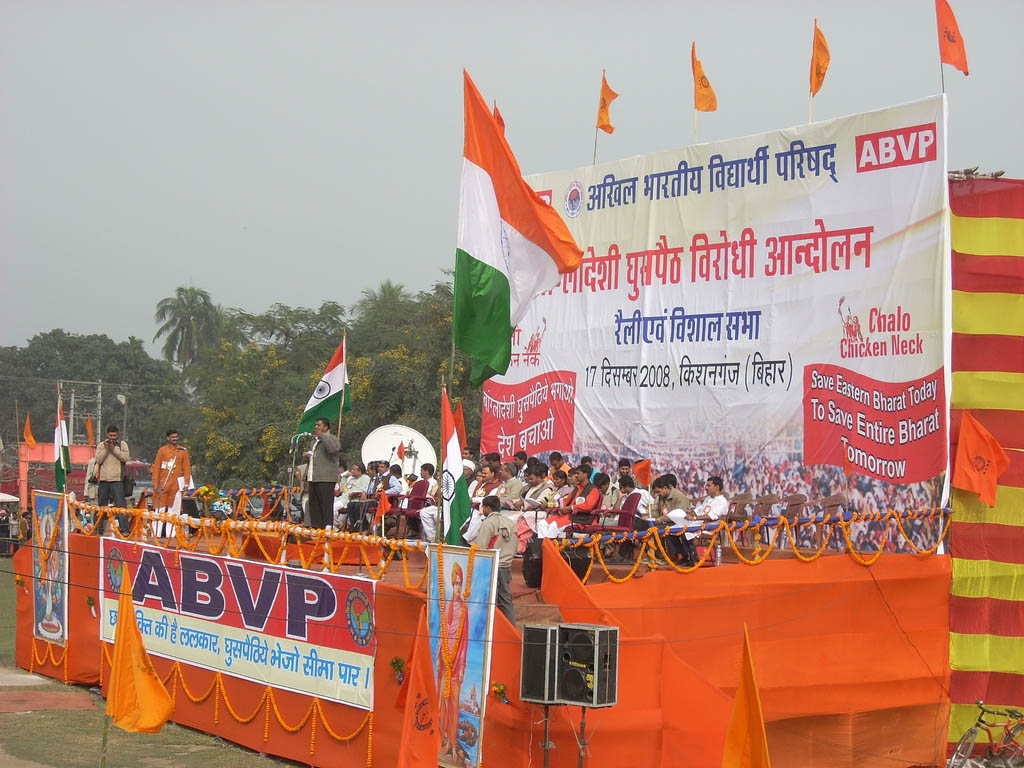
ABVP against Bangladeshi undocumented immigrants

It is estimated that several tens of millions of illegal immigrants live in India. Precise figures are not available, but the numbers run in tens of millions, at least 10 million are from Bangladesh, others being from Pakistan, Afghanistan, and others. According to the Government of India, there are at least 20 million illegal immigrants from Bangladesh alone. This makes India the country with the largest number of illegal immigrants in the world. During the Bangladesh Liberation War, at least 10 million Bangladeshis crossed into India illegally to seek refuge from widespread rape and genocide. According to Indian Home Ministry, at least 1.4 million Bangladeshi crossed over into India in the last decade alone. Samir Guha Roy of the Indian Statistical Institute states that internal migration is sometimes falsely thought to be immigrants. An analysis of the numbers by Roy revealed that on average around 91,000 Bangladeshi nationals might have crossed over to India every year during the years 1981–1991, thus, close to a million in a decade alone. How many of them were identified and pushed back is not known. It is possible that some of these illegal immigrants returned on their own.

According to a pro-Indian scholar, the trip to India from Bangladesh is one of the cheapest in the world, with a trip costing around Rs. 2000 (around $30 US), which includes the fee for the "Tour Operator". As Bangladeshis are culturally similar to the Bengali people in India, they are able to pass off as Indian citizens and settle down in any part of India to establish a future, for a very small price. This false identity can be bolstered with false documentation available for as little as Rs. 200 ($3 US) can even make them part of the vote bank.

India is constructing barriers on its eastern borders to combat the surge of migrants. The Indo-Bangladeshi barrier is 4,000 km (2,500 mi) long. Presently, India is constructing a fence along the border to restrict illegal traffic from Bangladesh. This obstruction will virtually isolate Bangladesh from India. The barrier's plan is based on the designs of the Israeli West Bank barrier and will be 3.6 m (11.8 ft) high. The stated aim of the fence is to stop infiltration of terrorists, prevent smuggling, and end illegal immigration from Bangladesh.

==== Malaysia ====
There are an estimated 800,000 illegal immigrants in Malaysia. In January 2009, Malaysia banned the hiring of foreign workers in factories, stores and restaurants to protect its citizens from mass unemployment amid the late 2000s recession. An ethnic Indian Malaysian was recently sentenced to whipping and 10 months in prison for hiring six illegal immigrants at his restaurant. "I think that after this, Malaysian employers will be afraid to take in foreign workers (without work permits). They will think twice", said immigration department prosecutor Azlan Abdul Latiff. "This is the first case where an employer is being sentenced to caning", he said. Illegal immigrants also face caning before being deported.

==== Pakistan ====
As of 2005, 2.1% of the population of Pakistan had foreign origins, however the number of immigrants population in Pakistan recently grew sharply. Immigrants from South Asia make up a growing proportion of immigrants in Pakistan. The five largest immigrant groups in Pakistan are in turn Afghans, Bangladeshis, Tajiks, Uzbeks, Turkmens, Iranians, Indians, Sri Lankan, Burmese, and Britons, including a sizeable number of those of Pakistani origin. Other significant expatriate communities in the country are Armenians, Australians, Turks, Chinese, Americans, Filipinos, Bosnians, and many others. In October 2023, the government of Pakistan announced a plan to deport foreign nationals who either lacked valid visas or had overstayed their visas by more than one year. The mass deportations primarily targeted Afghan nationals without legal documentation to remain in Pakistan. By November 2025, Pakistan had repatriated a total of 1.7 million Afghans.

==== Philippines ====
It was estimated by Teresita Ang-See, a prominent leader and activist of the Chinese Filipino community, that by 2007, as many as 100,000 illegal immigrants from mainland China are living in the Philippines, a tenth of the ethnic Chinese population. The latest influx has come in part because of Manila's move in 2005 to liberalise entry procedures for Chinese tourists and investors, a move that helped triple the number of Chinese visitors to 133,000 the prior year. Many of the new Chinese immigrants encounter hostility from many Filipinos, including Filipino-born Chinese, for being perceived as engaging in criminal activities and fraud, to being of unruly behaviour.

==== South Korea ====
According to the Republic of Korea Immigration Service, as of 31 December 2014, there were 208,778 illegal immigrants, which is 11.6% of 1,797,618 total foreign nationals who resided in South Korea. Most illegal immigrants in South Korea are Asian. The top 10 home countries of those illegal immigrants all came from other Asian countries with China at number 1 followed by Thailand, Vietnam, Philippines, Mongolia, Indonesia, Uzbekistan, Bangladesh, Sri Lanka, and Cambodia.

==== Other countries ====
- China: China is building a security barrier along its border with North Korea to prevent the refugees or defectors from North Korea. Moreover, many illegal immigrants from Mongolia have tried to make it to China. There might be as many as 100,000 Africans in Guangzhou, mostly illegal overstayers. To encourage people to report foreigners living illegally in China, for instance during the 2010 Asian Games in Guangzhou, the police gave a 100 yuan reward to whistle blowers whose information successfully led to deportation).
- Nepal: in 2008, Nepal's government led by the Communist Party of Nepal (Maoist Centre) initiated a major crackdown against Tibetan exiles with the aim to deport to China all Tibetans living illegally in the country. Tibetans started pouring into Nepal after a failed anti-Chinese 1959 Tibetan uprising.
- Thailand: Thailand has become a major destination of illegal immigration, especially from neighbouring countries. A law passed in 1979, a time when many Vietnamese and Cambodian people were entering Thailand as refugees, gave authorities nearly unlimited powers to detain illegal immigrants indefinitely, with few guidelines regarding the treatment of detainees. The law also requires most resident foreigners to notify the government every time they leave their permanent residence for more than 24 hours. This law had fallen into disuse but as of 2019 was revived due to a crackdown under the slogan "Good guys in, Bad guys out".

=== Americas ===
==== Brazil ====
Brazil has long been part of international migration routes. In 2009, the government estimated the number of illegal immigrants at about 200,000 people; a Catholic charity working with immigrants said there were 600,000 illegal immigrants (75,000 of whom were from Bolivia). That same year, the National Congress of Brazil approved an amnesty, opening a six-month window for all foreigners to seek legalization irrespective of their previous standing before the law. Brazil last legalized all immigrants in 1998; bilateral deals, one of which promoted the legalization of all reciprocal immigrants with Bolivia to date, signed in 2005, are also common. Illegal immigrants in Brazil enjoy the same legal privileges as native Brazilians regarding access to social services such as public education and the Brazilian public healthcare system. A Federal Police operation investigated Chinese immigrants who traveled through six countries before arriving in São Paulo to work under substandard conditions in the textile industry. An October 2009 piece from O Globo, quoting a UNDP study, estimates the number of illegal immigrants at 0.7 million, and points out to a recent wave of xenophobia among the general populace.

==== Canada ====
There is no credible information available on illegal immigration in Canada. Estimates range between 35,000 and 120,000 illegal immigrants in Canada. James Bissett, a former head of the Canadian Immigration Service, has suggested that the lack of any credible refugee screening process, combined with a high likelihood of ignoring any deportation orders, has resulted in tens of thousands of outstanding warrants for the arrest of rejected refugee claimants, with little attempt at enforcement. Refugee claimants in Canada do not have to attempt re-entry to learn the status of their claim. A 2008 report by the Auditor General Sheila Fraser stated that Canada has lost track of as many as 41,000 illegal immigrants. This number was predicted to increase drastically with the expiration of temporary employer work permits issued in 2007 and 2008, which were not renewed in many cases because of the shortage of work due to the recession.

==== Chile ====
In November 2025, Peruvian President José Jerí declared a state of emergency along the southern border with Chile to block an influx of undocumented migrants, primarily Venezuelans. Large numbers of Venezuelans attempted to leave Chile and enter Peru following threats of mass expulsion from Chilean President-elect José Antonio Kast.

==== Mexico ====
In the first six months of 2005, more than 120,000 people from Central America were deported, as compared to 2002, when for the entire year, only 130,000 were deported. People of Han Chinese origin pay about $5,500 to smugglers to be taken to Mexico from Hong Kong. It is estimated that 2.4% of rejections for work permits in Mexico correspond to Chinese citizens. In a 2010 news story, USA Today reported, "... Mexico's Arizona-style law requires local police to check IDs. And Mexican police freely engage in racial profiling and routinely harass Central American migrants, say immigration activists." Many women from Eastern Europe, Asia, and Central and South America take jobs at table dance establishments in large cities. The National Institute of Migration (INM) in Mexico raids strip clubs and deport foreigners who work without proper documentation. In 2004, the INM deported 188,000 people at a cost of US$10 million.

In September 2007, Mexican President Calderón harshly criticized the United States government for the crackdown on illegal immigrants, saying it has led to the persecution of immigrant workers without visas. "I have said that Mexico does not stop at its border, that wherever there is a Mexican, there is Mexico", he said. However, Mexico has also deported US citizens, deporting 2,000 cases in 2015 and 1,243 in 2014. Illegal immigration of Cubans through Cancún tripled from 2004 to 2006. In October 2008, Mexico tightened its immigration rules and agreed to deport Cubans who use the country as an entry point to the US. It also criticized US policy that generally allows Cubans who reach US territory to stay. Cuban Foreign Minister said the Cuban-Mexican agreement would lead to "the immense majority of Cubans being repatriated".

In 2024, Mexican authorities recorded more than 1.2 million cases of illegal migration. Most of these migrants came from Latin America and the Caribbean, primarily Venezuela, Guatemala, Honduras, Ecuador, Haiti, and Colombia. In response to the rising numbers and U.S. pressure, Mexico tightened migration controls and deployed 10,000 additional National Guard troops to its borders in February 2025. The number of undocumented migrants registered by Mexican authorities fell by 87% in 2025 compared with 2024.

==== Peru ====
In November 2025, Peruvian President José Jerí declared a state of emergency along the southern border with Chile to block an influx of undocumented migrants, primarily Venezuelans. Large numbers of Venezuelans attempted to leave Chile and enter Peru following threats of mass expulsion from Chilean President-elect José Antonio Kast.

==== United States ====
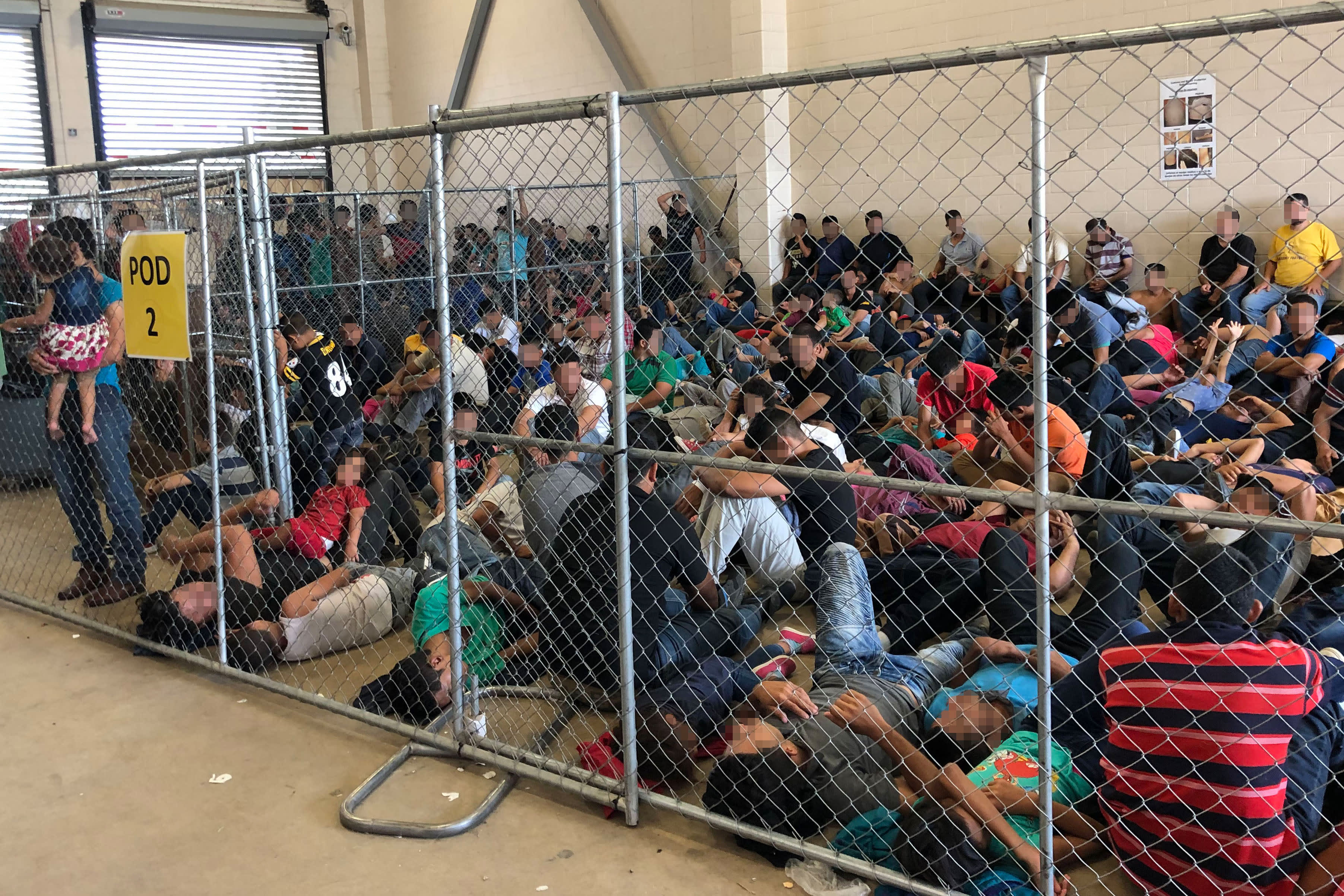
Detained illegal immigrants at the overcrowded United States Border Patrol's McAllen, Texas station, 2019

History of immigration enforcement actions, raw numbers as reported by the US Department of Homeland Security

As a percent of US population, recent figures for enforcement actions are similar to those in several past decades.

As a proportion of US population, nationwide border encounters have varied substantially over the decades.

Approximately 11 million illegal immigrants were estimated to be living in the United States in 2006. The Pew Hispanic Center estimated that this peaked at 12 million in March 2007 and declined to 11 million again in March 2009. The majority of the illegal immigrants are from Mexico. The issue of illegal immigration has long been controversial in the United States. In 2007, President George W. Bush called for Congress to endorse his guest worker proposal, stating that illegal immigrants took jobs that Americans would not take.

The Pew Hispanic Center notes that while the number of legal immigrants arriving has not varied substantially since the 1980s, the number of illegal immigrants has increased dramatically and, since the mid-1990s, has surpassed the number of legal immigrants. Penalties for employers of illegal immigrants, of $2,000–$10,000 and up to six months' imprisonment, go largely unenforced. Political groups such as Americans for Legal Immigration have formed to demand the enforcement of immigration laws and secure borders. ALIPAC has also called for "safe departure" border checkpoints, free of criminal checks. In a 2011 news story, the Los Angeles Times reported,

... illegal immigrants in 2010 were parents of 5.5 million children, 4.5 million of whom were born in the U.S. and are citizens. Because illegal immigrants are younger and more likely to be married, they represented a disproportionate share of births—8% of the babies born in the U.S. between March 2009 and March 2010 were to at least one illegal immigrant parent.

Pro-sanctuary states are in blue, states which have banned sanctuary cities are in red, and states in gray have no official policy.

Immigration from Mexico to the United States slowed in the early 2010s. This has been attributed to the slowing of the US economy, the buildup in security along the border and increased violence on the Mexican side of the Mexico–United States border. In 2016, the Library of Congress announced it would substitute "noncitizens" and "unauthorized immigration" for "illegal aliens" as a bibliographic retrieval term, saying the once common phrase had become offensive, and was not precise. However, the change was suspended and the heading "illegal aliens" remains in use. In 2018, Attorney General Jeff Sessions instructed the US attorneys' offices not to use the term "undocumented immigrants", but to instead refer to people as "illegal aliens".

Sanctuary cities are US jurisdictions (cities, counties, or states) that limit cooperation with federal immigration authorities, specifically by restricting local law enforcement from assisting in enforcing federal immigration law. Local law enforcement in these jurisdictions often restricts honoring Immigration and Customs Enforcement (ICE) detainer requests and avoids questioning residents about their legal status. On his first day in office, Joe Biden halted the construction of the Mexico–United States border wall, ending the national emergency declared by the Trump administration on 1 February 2019. Early during Biden's tenure, a surge in migrants at the US border stirred controversy. According to an August 2025 Pew Research Center report, the unauthorized immigrant population grew by 3.5 million between 2021 and 2023, reaching a record 14 million.

U.S. southwest border encounters decreased beginning in 2025.

In response to pressure from the United States, Mexico increased its border enforcement in 2025. Combined with tighter U.S. border restrictions, migrant encounters at the U.S.–Mexico border fell to 237,538 in fiscal year 2025, the lowest level since 1970. Between February and July 2025, total encounters dropped by 93.3% compared with the same period in 2024.

==== Other countries ====
- Venezuela: an estimated 200,000 Colombians fled the Colombian conflict and sought safety in Venezuela. Most of them lacked identity documents, which hampered their access to services, as well as to the labor market. The Venezuelan government has no specific policies on refugees. A much greater number of Venezuelans entered Colombia trying to escape from the political, economic and humanitarian crisis in the 21st century, especially during the last five to 10 years.
- Chile: Chile has recently become a new pole of attraction for illegal immigrants, mostly from neighboring Peru and Bolivia but also Ecuador, Colombia, Dominican Republic, Paraguay, Cuba, Venezuela and Haiti. According to the 2002 national census, Chile's foreign-born foreign population has increased by 75% since 1992.
- Dominican Republic: the Dominican Republic is a nation that shares the island of Hispaniola with Haiti. An estimated 1,000,000 Haitians live and work in the Dominican Republic, which has a total population of about ten million. The percentage of Haitians that have illegally immigrated to the Dominican Republic is not accurately known, and "many Dominicans have come to resent the influx of lower-paid workers from across the border and have sought to make their country less hospitable to noncitizens."

=== Eurasia and Oceania ===
==== Australia ====
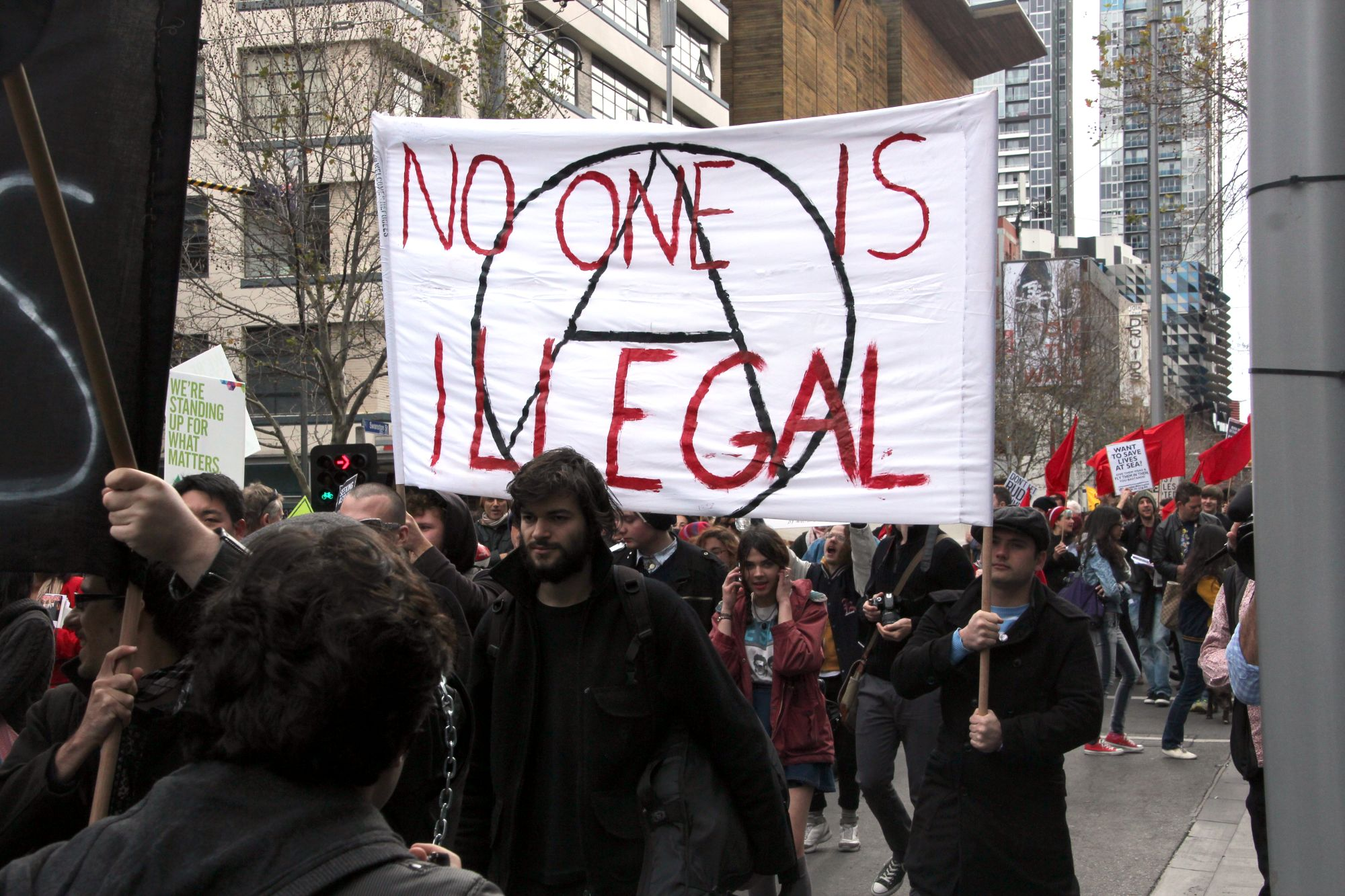
Anarchist protest in Australia with banner reading "no one is illegal"

On 1 June 2013, the Migration Amendment (Reform of Employer Sanctions) Act 2013 commenced. This new law puts the onus on businesses to ensure that their employees maintain the necessary work entitlements in Australia. The new legislation also enables the Australian Department of Immigration and Citizenship to levy infringement notices against the business (AUD $15,300) and individual (AUD $3,060) employers on a strict liability basis—meaning that there is no requirement to prove fault, negligence or intention.

==== Russia ====
Russia experiences a constant flow of immigration. On average, 200,000 legal immigrants enter the country every year; about half are ethnic Russians from other republics of the former Soviet Union. There are an estimated 10–12 million foreigners working in the country without legal permission to be there. There has been a significant influx of ethnic Georgians, Armenians, Azerbaijanis, Tajiks, and Uzbeks into large Russian cities in recent years, which has been viewed very unfavourably by many citizens and contributed to nationalist sentiments.

Many immigrant ethnic groups have much higher birth rates than native Russians, further shifting the balance. Some Chinese flee the overpopulation and birth control regulations of their home country and settle in the Far East and southern Siberia. Russia's main Pacific port and naval base of Vladivostok, once closed to foreigners, today is bristling with Chinese markets, restaurants and trade houses. Illegal border crossing is considered a crime, and captured illegal border crossers have been sentenced to prison terms. For example, Rossiyskaya Gazeta reported in October 2008 the case of a North Korean who was detained after illegally crossing the Amur River from China. Considered by Russian authorities an "economic migrant", he was sentenced to 6 months in prison and was to be deported to the country of his nationality after serving his sentence, although he may now risk an even heavier penalty there. That was just one of the 26 cases year-to-date of illegal entrants, of various nationalities, receiving criminal punishment in Amur Oblast.

==== Turkey ====
Turkey receives many economic migrants from nearby countries such as Azerbaijan, Georgia, Armenia, but also from North Caucasus, Central Asia, West Asia, Afghanistan and Pakistan. The Iraq War is thought to have increased the flow of illegal immigration into Turkey, and the global parties directly involved in the conflict have been accused of extending a less-helping hand than Turkey itself to resolve the precarious situation of immigrants stranded in the passage.

=== Europe ===
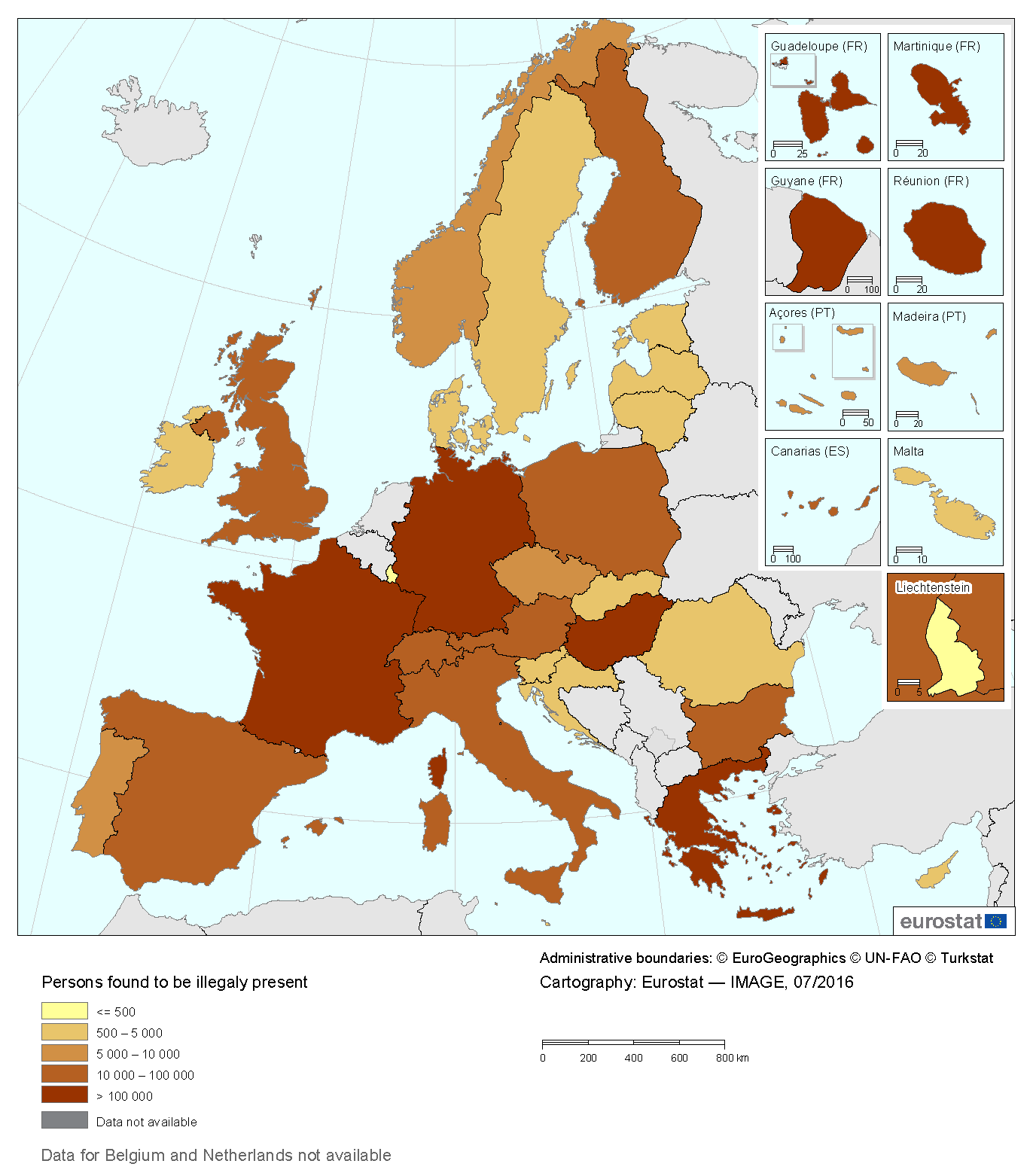
Eurostat: Non-EU citizens found to be illegally present in the EU-28 and EFTA, 2015

The Schengen Area is a multilateral agreement between 27 states in which they in most cases abolish the border control among themselves. These states include most of the EU countries, as well as the EEC countries Norway, Switzerland and Iceland. Any person who is physically inside any of the Schengen states will usually be able to travel to any other Schengen state without hindrance from the law enforcement, even if they have no legal right to enter another Schengen Area member state. A person who wishes to immigrate illegally to a Schengen Area member state may therefore find it more practical to enter it through another member state. According to a BBC report from 2012, over 80% of illegal immigrants entering the European Union pass through Greece.

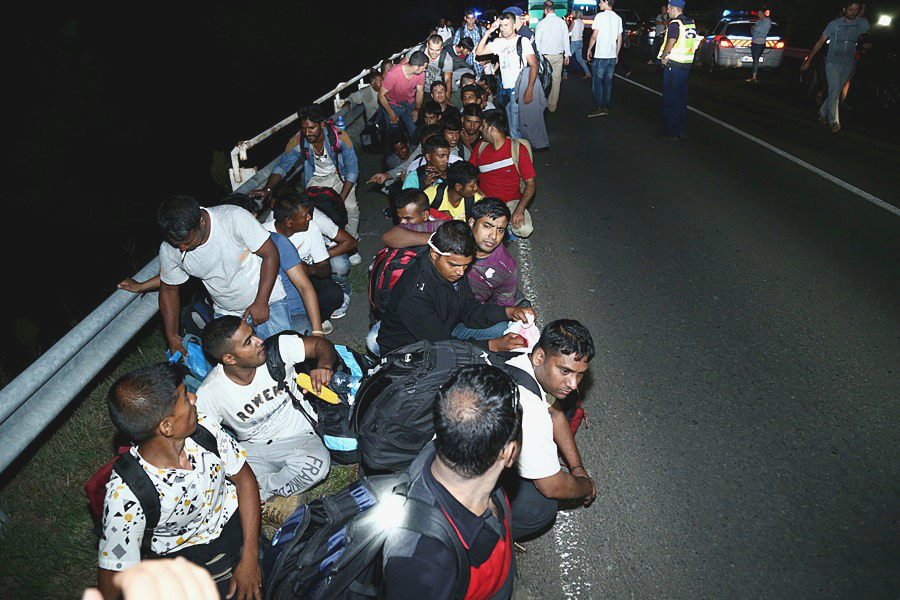
Migrants along the Balkan route crossing from Serbia into Hungary, 24 August 2015

EU countries that are not members of the Schengen Agreement are still committed to allow lawful entry by citizens of EU countries; however, they may exercise border control at their discretion. Citizens within the EU is an economic and political partnership between 28 European countries that together cover much of the European continent. A citizen of an EU member state has the right to seek employment within any other member state. The Schengen Agreement does not regulate treatment of persons who enter the Schengen Area illegally. This is therefore left to the individual states, and other applicable international treaties and European case law. Illegal immigration to Schengen and to Europe in general was increasing sharply since approximately early 2014.

==== France ====
Children born to noncitizens in France are not immigrants themselves, but they are considered foreigners under French law, until they reach the age of 18, at which time they automatically become citizens. French citizenship is based in the idea of political unity and is a citizenship that may be more accessible than other EU countries, such as Germany and the UK; however, many French citizens feel that those who gain French citizenship should conform to the cultural aspects of French life. There were between 890,000 and 1.2 million illegal immigrants in France. French law prohibits anyone from assisting or trying to assist "the entry of a foreigner in France" (except for a non-EU national, entering in metropolitan France illegally from the territory of a Schengen country), which enabled them to harass activists helping refugees

==== Hungary ====
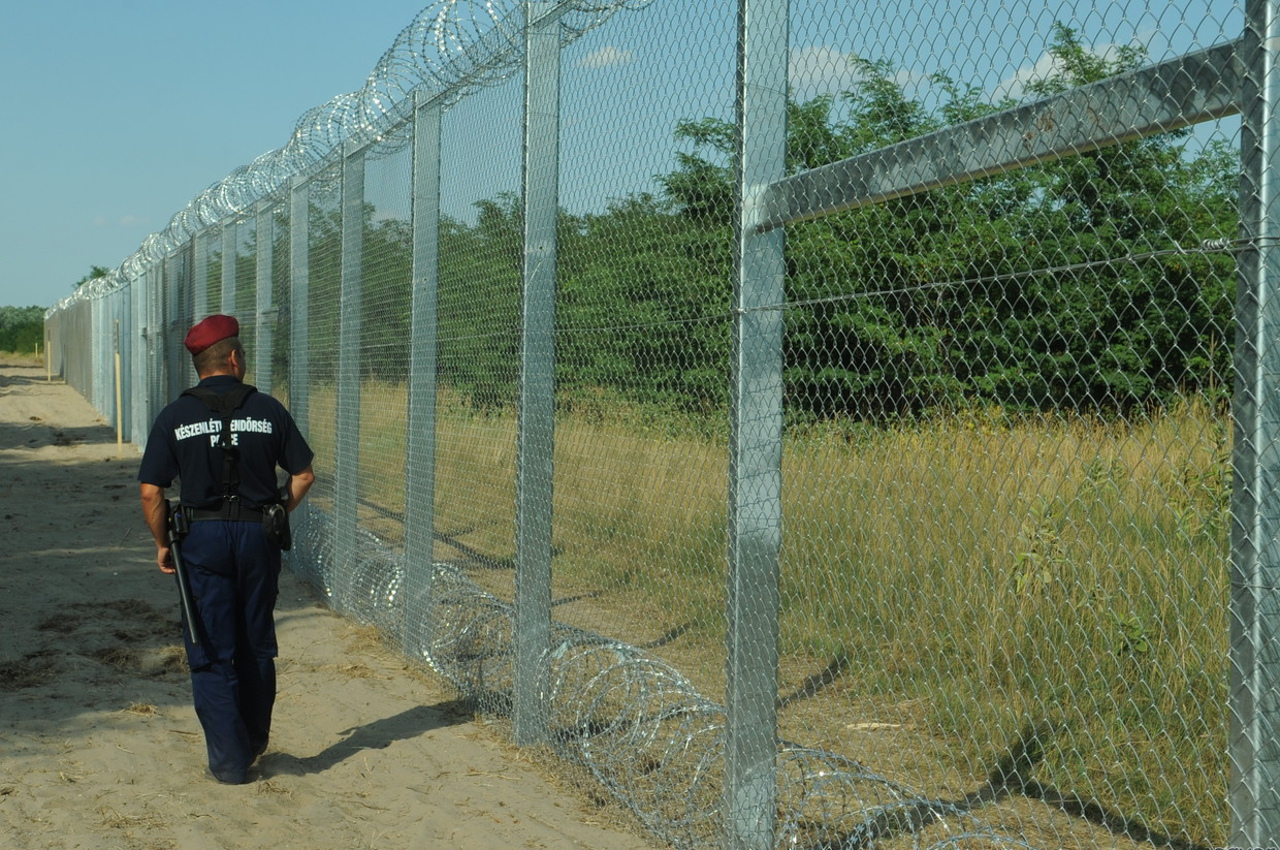
The Hungarian–Serbian border fence

In 2014, Hungary registered 43,000 asylum seekers and 80,000 up to July 2015. In the summer of 2015, Hungary started building a 4m high fence along its 175 km border to neighbouring Serbia to keep out the tens of thousands illegal immigrants from the Middle East and migrants trying to reach the European Union. The border was sealed on 15 September 2015 and the fence was the following day attacked by refugees and defended by riot police. With the Hungary-Serbia border closed, migrants then started heading to Croatia, but as Croatia led the migrants to the Hungary-Croatia border, Hungary then started the construction of a second fence along its border with Croatia on 18 September 2015.

==== Spain ====
On 9 October 2024, Spanish Prime Minister Pedro Sánchez urged the European Parliament to accelerate the implementation of the New Pact on Migration and Asylum to address the ongoing migration crisis in the Canary Islands. The region experienced a record influx of 46,843 migrants, primarily from Senegal, Mali and Morocco, representing an increase from 39,910 arrivals in 2023. Sánchez proposed legislation to establish a mandatory distribution system for migrants across Spanish regions to ease the pressure on the Canary Islands. Sánchez has supported policies aimed at encouraging immigration as a strategy to counteract Spain's demographic decline and aging population.

In January 2026, Sánchez authorized a decree aimed at regularizing approximately 500,000 undocumented immigrants residing in Spain. In July 2026, almost 1.2 million of Spain's undocumented migrants applied for legal status. The largest groups of applicants came from Colombia (25.9%), Morocco (13.3%), Venezuela (11.8%), Peru (8.8%), and Honduras (4.9%). On 14 November 2026, a single-day record of 1,580 migrants arrived in Spain's Canary Islands aboard 15 boats, mostly landing on the island of El Hierro. Most of the arrivals departed from West African countries, including Senegal, The Gambia, and Guinea.

==== United Kingdom ====
Many try to cross the English Channel from Calais to seek asylum or refugee status in the United Kingdom. Truck drivers can be fined up to €2,500 if illegal immigrants are found on board. The Home Office has its agents working alongside French police and immigration agents, to prevent unauthorized people from entering the zone. An area of Calais known as "Camp de la Lande" had a police raid in September 2009 to control illegal immigration. The French also try to stop illegal immigrants from entering France from the southern part of the country.

In 1986, an Iranian man was sent back to Paris, from London, as he was unable to present any ID to British immigration officers. He stayed at the airport for nearly twenty years and his story loosely inspired a film, The Terminal. As of 2009 there were between 550,000 and 950,000 illegal immigrants in the United Kingdom. The United Kingdom is a difficult country to reach as it is mostly located on one island and part of another, but traffickers in Calais, France, have tried to smuggle illegal immigrants into the UK. Many illegal immigrants come from Africa and Asia. As of 2008 there were also many from Eastern Europe and Latin America having overstayed their visas.

A 2012 study carried out by the University of Oxford's Centre on Migration, Policy and Society (COMPAS) has estimated that there were 120,000 illegal migrant children in the UK, of whom 65,000 were born in the UK to parents without legal status. According to the study these children are at risk of destitution, exploitation and social exclusion because of contradictory and frequently changing rules and regulations which jeopardize their access to healthcare, education, protection by the police and other public services.

The Home Office estimated that 4,000 to 10,000 applications a year to stay in the UK are made on the basis of a sham marriage. Many illegal immigrants or asylum seekers have tried to enter the UK from France, by hiding inside trucks or trains. On 11 August 2020, the Government of the United Kingdom and France worked together on a single channel to finalize a new plan for blocking illegal migrant route. Many of the migrants who aimed to emigrate to the United Kingdom came from Afghanistan, Iraq, Iran, Syria and countries in Africa, fleeing poverty, persecution or war. In 2025, a total of 41,472 migrants arrived in the UK via small boat crossings in the English Channel.

==== Other countries ====
- Bulgaria: in 2013, 11,000 persons attempted to enter Bulgaria via its border with Turkey. Their aim is not believed by Bulgarian border officials to remain in Bulgaria, but to go to other European countries. In November 2013, Bulgaria started building a razor wire fence on its Turkey border, which was completed in 2015.
- Germany: the number of irregular immigrants caught in Germany was 42,478 in 2018 and 40,610 in 2019 according to the Federal Police. The numbers rose sharply with the Russian invasion of Ukraine from 57,637 entries in 2021 to 91,986 in 2022.
- Italy: in November 2023, Italian Prime Minister Giorgia Meloni and her Albanian counterpart Edi Rama signed an agreement to relocate migrants to Albania, a deal criticized by International Rescue Committee and Doctors Without Borders. Italy plans to construct two detention centres in Albania which would initially house 3,000 individuals upon opening in late 2024, but could process up to 36,000 people annually once fully operational. Meloni has previously threatened immediate deportation of migrants, which is not allowed within the EU, and Albania's position outside the EU is viewed as significant in light of this. In response the European Commission requested further details on the arrangement for scrutiny.
- Norway: the number of illegal immigrants in Norway was estimated to roughly 20 thousand in 2009, and to between 18 and 56 thousand in 2017. Estimates by organizations working with illegal migrants are much lower, between 5 thousand and 10 thousand in 2011.
- Romania: following the February 2022 Russian invasion of Ukraine and subsequent travel restrictions under the 2022 Ukrainian mobilization, more than 30,000 Ukrainian men have evaded conscription by illegally crossing into Romania to avoid front-line service, with Romanian authorities granting them temporary protection status under European Union measures.
- Switzerland: it is estimated that at least 100,000 individuals reside in Switzerland without being registered with the authorities and thus are considered illegal immigrants by the state. Many are also workers, employed as nannies, labourers on farms or construction sites, as well as waiters or kitchen or other ancillary staff in the restaurant and hotel industry.

=== Middle East ===
==== Iran ====
Since late April 2007, the Iranian government has forcibly deported back Afghans living and working in Iran to Afghanistan at a rate between 250,000 and 300,000 per year. The forceful evictions of the refugees, who lived in Iran and Pakistan for nearly three decades, are part of the two countries' larger plans to repatriate all Afghan refugees within a few years. Iran said that it would send 1,000,000 by March 2008, and Pakistan announced that all 2,400,000 Afghan refugees, most living in camps, must return home by 2009. Aimal Khan, a political analyst at the Sustainable Development Policy Institute in Islamabad said it would be "disastrous" for Afghanistan.

Iran plans to remove two million undocumented Afghan migrants by March 2025, with authorities reporting a rise in arrests and voluntary returns. The government is under pressure to manage immigration enforcement while addressing the needs of its undocumented population. In May 2025, Iran launched a large-scale deportation campaign targeting approximately 4 million Afghan nationals residing within the country.

==== Israel ====
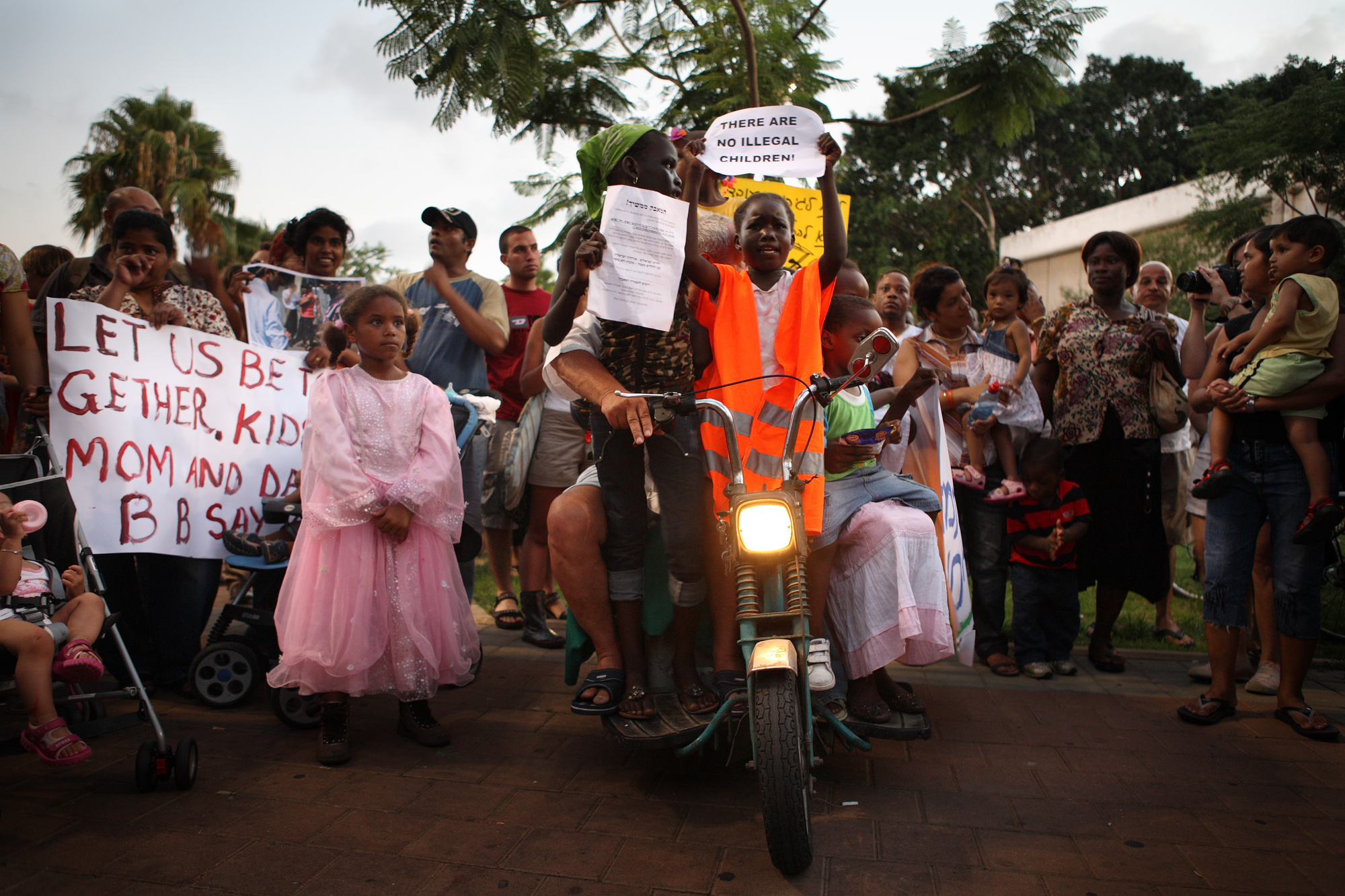
Demonstration against the expulsion of undocumented immigrants and their families from Israel, Tel Aviv, 2009

Tens of thousands of migrants, mostly from Sudan and Eritrea, had crossed the Israeli border between 2009 and 2012. Prime Minister Benjamin Netanyahu said that, "This phenomenon is very grave and threatens the social fabric of society, our national security and our national identity." In May 2012, Israel introduced a law which would allow illegal immigrants to be detained for up to three years, a measure that the Interior Ministry intended to stem the flow of Africans entering Israel across the desert border with Egypt. As a result, completing a barrier along the border with Egypt, illegal immigration from Africa decreased by over 99%.

Israel faces substantial (estimated at 40,000 in 2009) illegal immigration of Arab workers from the Palestinian Authority territories, a migration that includes both workers seeking employment, and homosexuals escaping the social opprobrium of Arab society. Thousands of foreign workers who entered the country on temporary visas have overstayed and live illegally in Israel. There is a debate within Israel as to whether the Israel-born children of foreign workers should be allowed to remain in the country.

==== Libya ====
Before the Libyan civil war, Libya was home to a large population of illegal immigrants from Sub-Saharan Africa, numbering as much as 2,000,000. The mass expulsion plan to summarily deport all illegally residing foreigners was announced by then-current Libyan leader Colonel Muammar al-Gaddafi in January 2008, "No resident without a legal visa will be excluded."

==== Saudi Arabia ====
In 2004, Saudi Arabia began construction of a Saudi–Yemen barrier between its territory and Yemen to prevent the unauthorized movement of people and goods into and out of the Kingdom. Anthony H. Cordesman labeled it a "separation barrier". In February 2004, The Guardian reported that Yemeni opposition newspapers likened the barrier to the Israeli West Bank barrier, while The Independent wrote, "Saudi Arabia, one of the most vocal critics in the Arab world of Israel's 'security fence' in the West Bank, is quietly emulating the Israeli example by erecting a barrier along its porous border with Yemen." Saudi officials rejected the comparison saying it was built to prevent infiltration and smuggling.

==== Syria ====
Since the US-led invasion of Iraq in March 2003, there are more refugees from Iraq. The United Nations estimates that nearly 2,200,000 Iraqis have fled the country since 2003, with nearly 100,000 fleeing to Syria and Jordan each month. Most ventured to Jordan and Syria, creating demographic shifts that have worried both governments. Refugees are mired in poverty as they are generally barred from working in their host countries. Syrian authorities worried that the new influx of refugees would limit the country's resources. Sources such as oil, heat, water and electricity were said to be becoming scarcer as demand were rising. On 1 October 2007, news agencies reported that Syria reimposed restrictions on Iraqi refugees, as stated by a spokesperson for the United Nations High Commissioner for Refugees. Under Syria's new rules, only Iraqi merchants, businessmen and university professors with visas acquired from Syrian embassies may enter Syria.

== List ==
Rank	Country	Estimated irregular migrant population	Year	Notes
1	United States	14,000,000	2023	Pew Research Center.
2	South Africa	2–5 million	2026	Associated Press.
3	Peru	1,300,000	2025	Reuters; National Superintendency of Migration.
4	Spain	1.0–1.2 million	2026	Reuters.
5	Germany	1.0–1.2 million	2017	Pew Research Center.
6	United Kingdom	800,000–1.2 million	2017	Pew Research Center.
7	Italy	500,000–700,000	2017	Pew Research Center.
8	Malaysia	518,000	2023	International Labour Organization.
9	Canada	Up to 500,000	2024	Government of Canada.
10	Colombia	500,000	2023	United Nations High Commissioner for Refugees.
11	France	300,000–400,000	2017	Pew Research Center.
12	Chile	336,984	2023	United Nations High Commissioner for Refugees.
13	Greece	300,000	2017	Pew Research Center.
14	Mexico	182,000	2022	International Organization for Migration.
15	Netherlands	100,000	2017	Pew Research Center.

== See also ==
- Asylum shopping
- Border control
- Criminalization of migration
- Deportation
- Environmental migration
- Free migration
- Immigration and crime
- Immigration and Customs Enforcement
- International Convention on the Protection of the Rights of All Migrant Workers and Members of Their Families
- Nationality law
- People smuggling
- Squatting
- Stowaway
- Undocumented youth in the United States
- Mexico–United States border crisis
- 2015 European migrant crisis
- Venezuelan refugee crisis
- Belarus–European Union border crisis
- African immigration to Israel
