= Criminalization of migration =

Criminalization of migration is the increasing trend of dealing with immigration using criminal law, as opposed to regulating it with administrative procedures. Alongside an imposition of criminal penalties for actions relating to migration, there is also increased incarceration of people crossing borders without authorization. In an Oxford University Press book, Professor Cathryn Costello argues that criminalization of migration does not meet the classic liberal principles of criminalization and there are compelling arguments against it. According to economist Walter Block, illegal immigration is a victimless crime from a libertarian perspective.
