= List of passports =

A passport is a booklet issued by countries to their citizens, permitting the person to travel to other countries. In some cases countries issue travel documents similar to passports to their residents. International organizations also issue travel documents, usually called laissez-passer, to their staff. This article shows images of the various passports currently issued.

Colors of ordinary passport covers across the world

== Contemporary ordinary passports ==
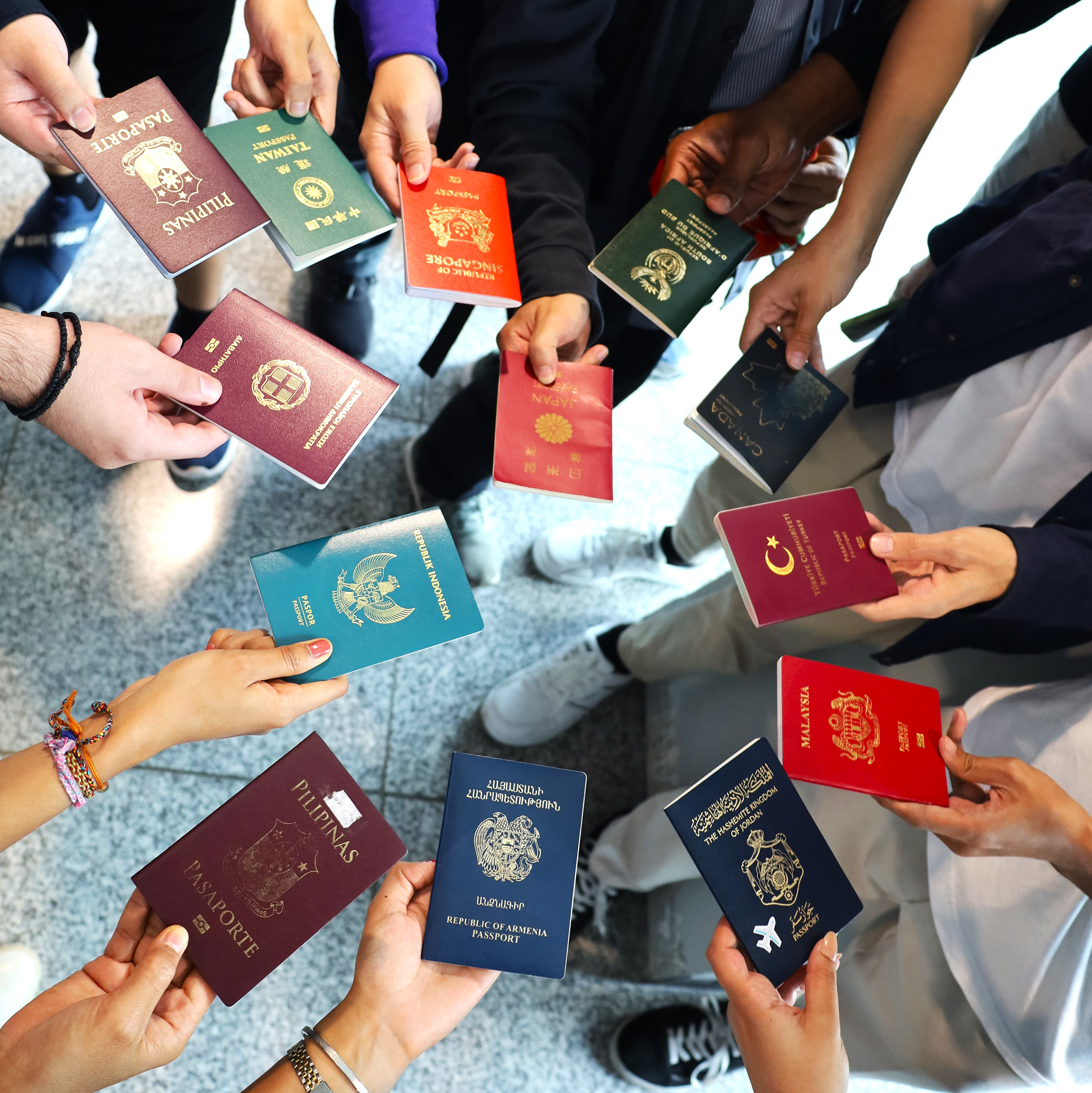
A group of people display their passports at an international conference.

=== Special cases ===
Passports where the captioned country is shown in italics are issued either by territories with extremely limited recognition of their passports or by states that are neither member states of the United Nations nor United Nations General Assembly non-member observer states.

However, even though Taiwan maintains official diplomatic relations with only 12 countries, its "Republic of China (Taiwan) Passport" is still accepted as a valid travel document in most countries of the world. Although its passport enjoys (for nationals with rights of abode in Taiwan) visa-free (or visa on arrival access) status in 137 countries, ranking the ordinary Taiwanese passport 29th in the world (tied with Uruguay) according to the Visa Restrictions Index, some countries, such as Argentina, Brazil, the People's Republic of China (PRC), Jamaica and Mauritius, pursuant to their positions on Taiwan's political status, refuse to visé or stamp Taiwan passports, and instead issue visas on a separate travel document or a separate piece of paper to Taiwanese travellers to avoid conveying any kind of recognition to Taiwan as a polity distinct from the People's Republic of China (PRC).

=== Africa ===

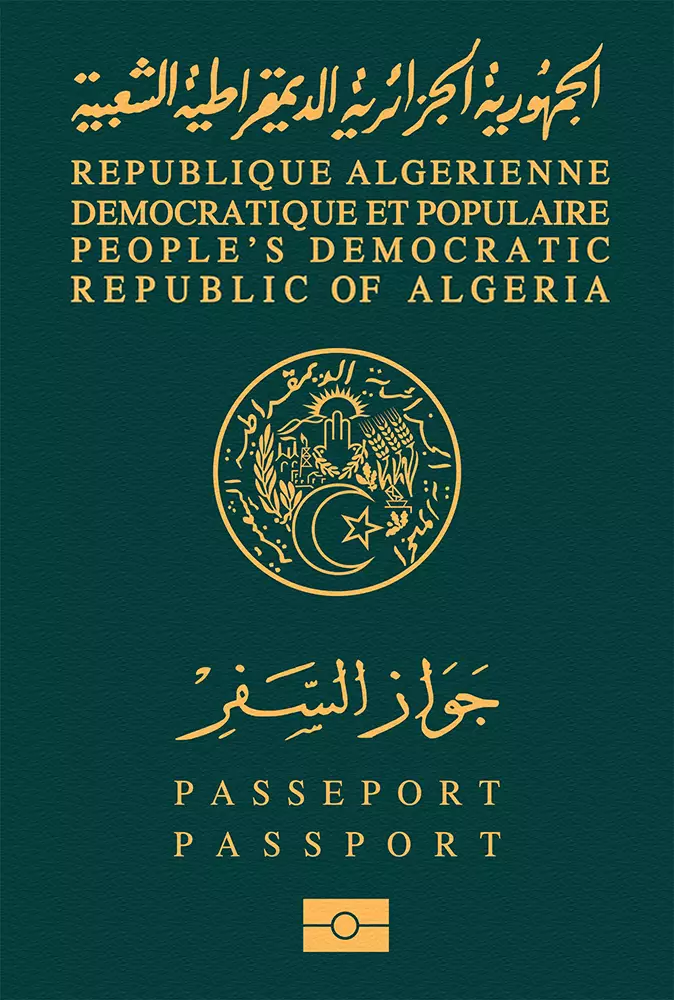
Algeria

Angola

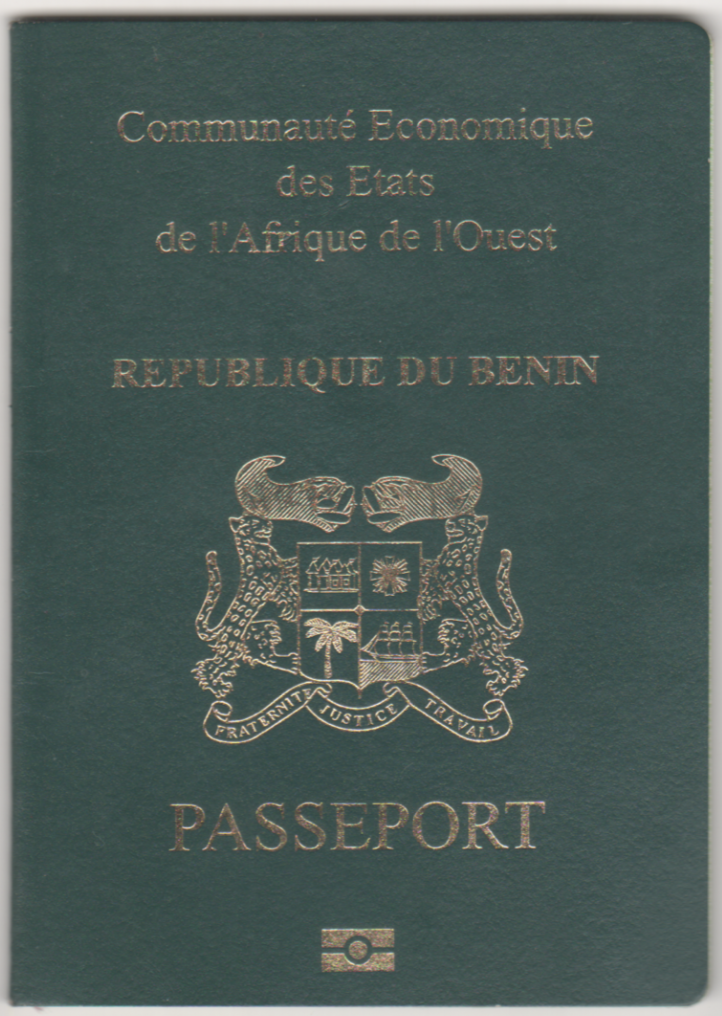
Benin

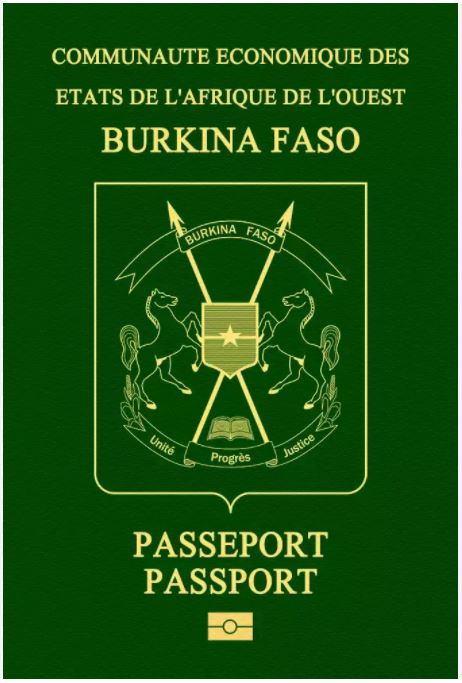
Burkina Faso

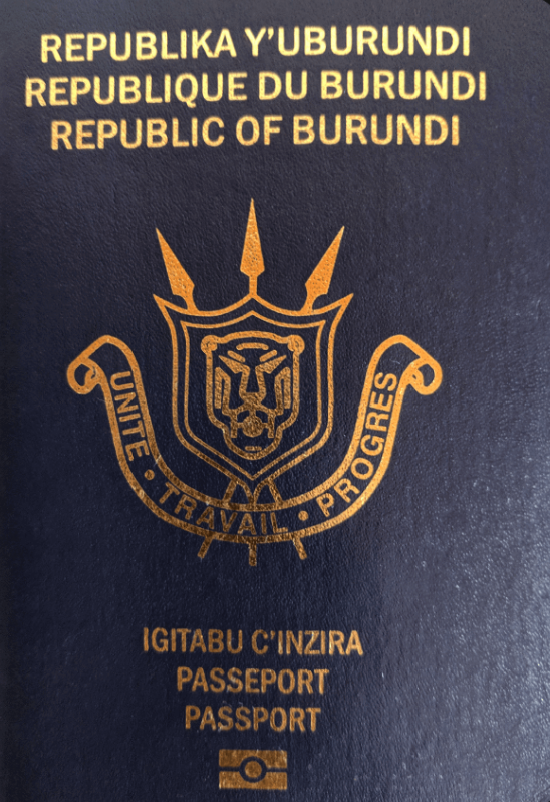
Burundi

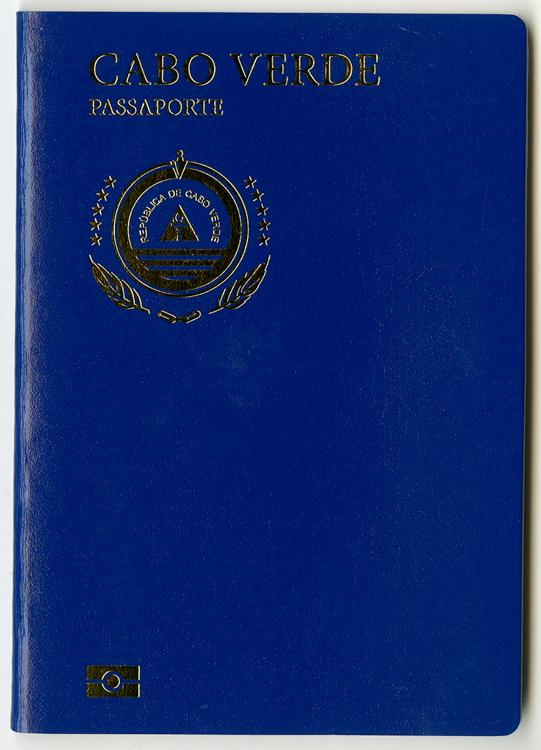
(Cape Verde) Cabo Verde

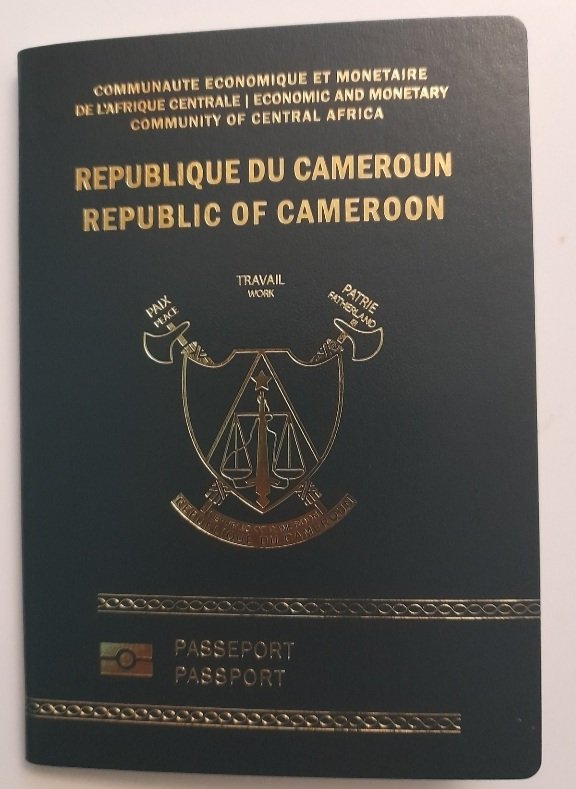
Cameroon

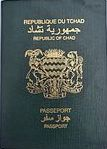
Chad

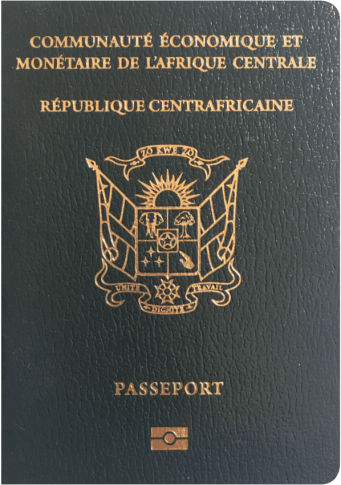
Central African Republic

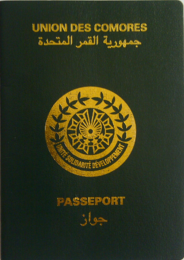
Comoros

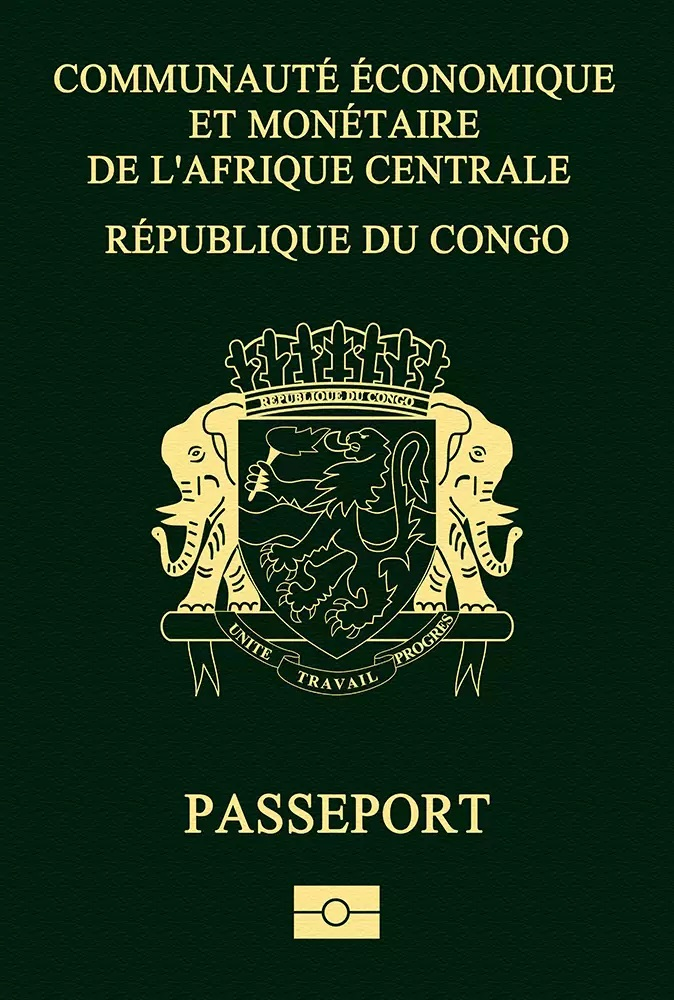
(Republic of the Congo) Congo

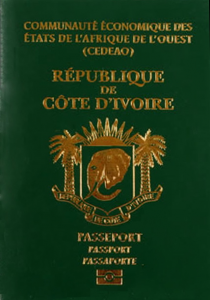
(Ivory Coast) Côte d'Ivoire

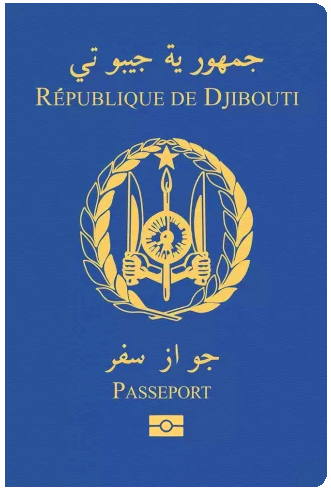
Djibouti

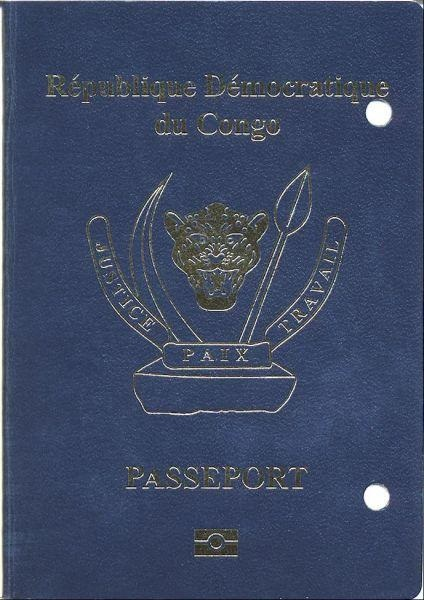
(Democratic Republic of the Congo) DR Congo

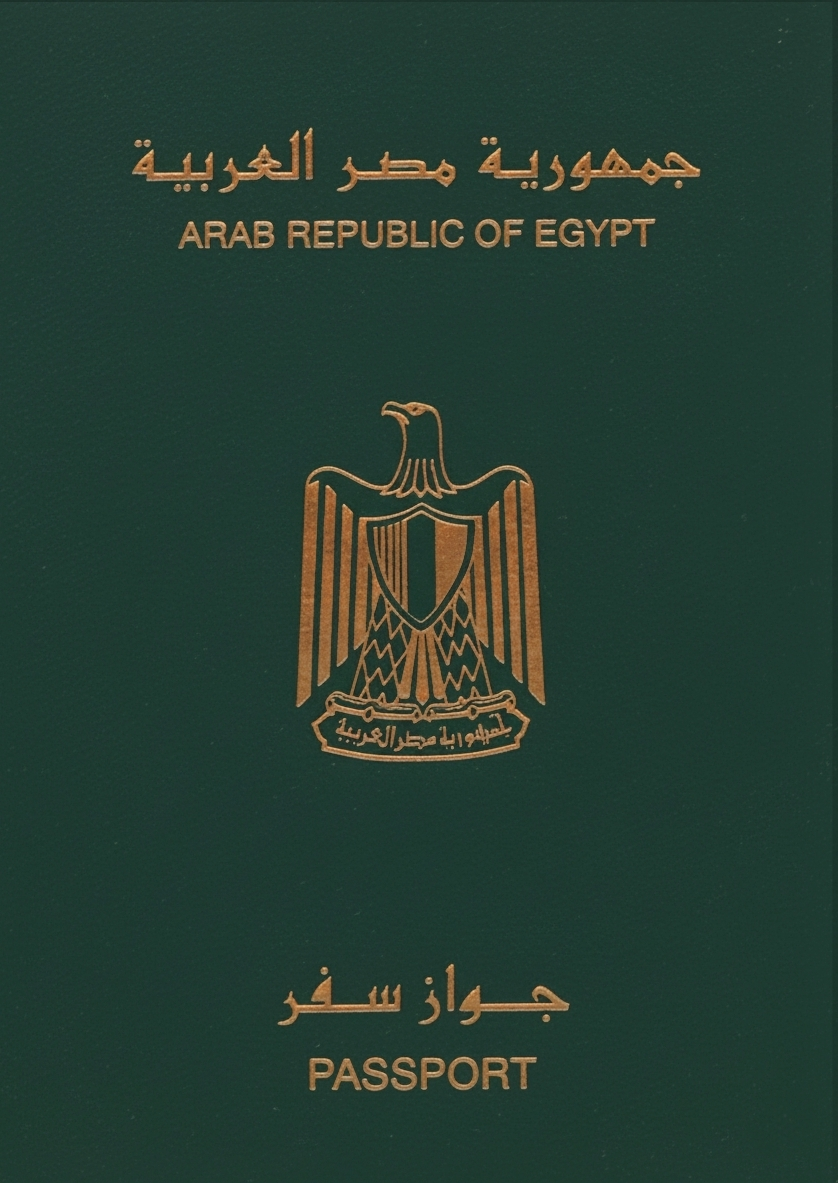
Egypt

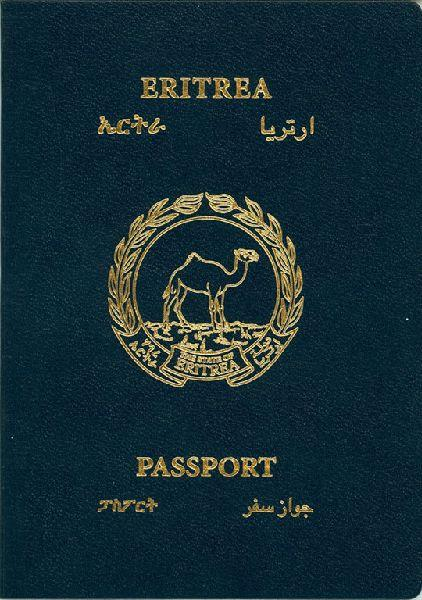
Eritrea

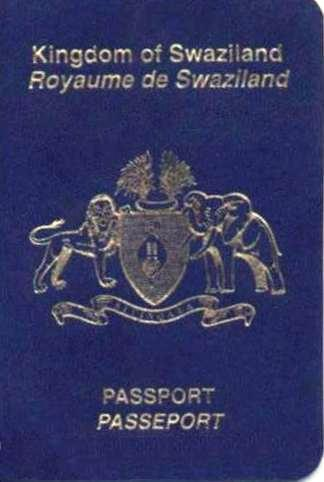
Eswatini

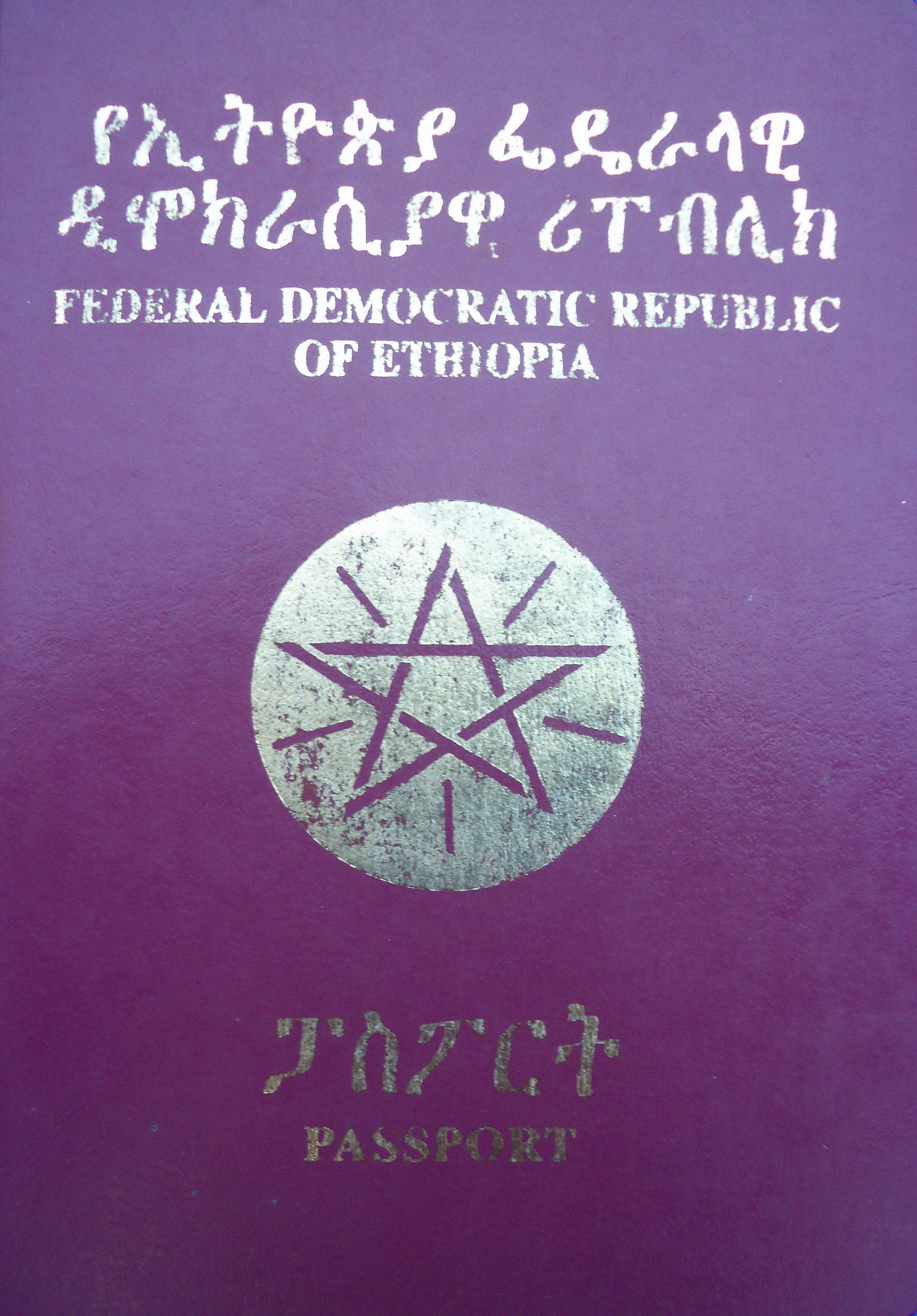
Ethiopia

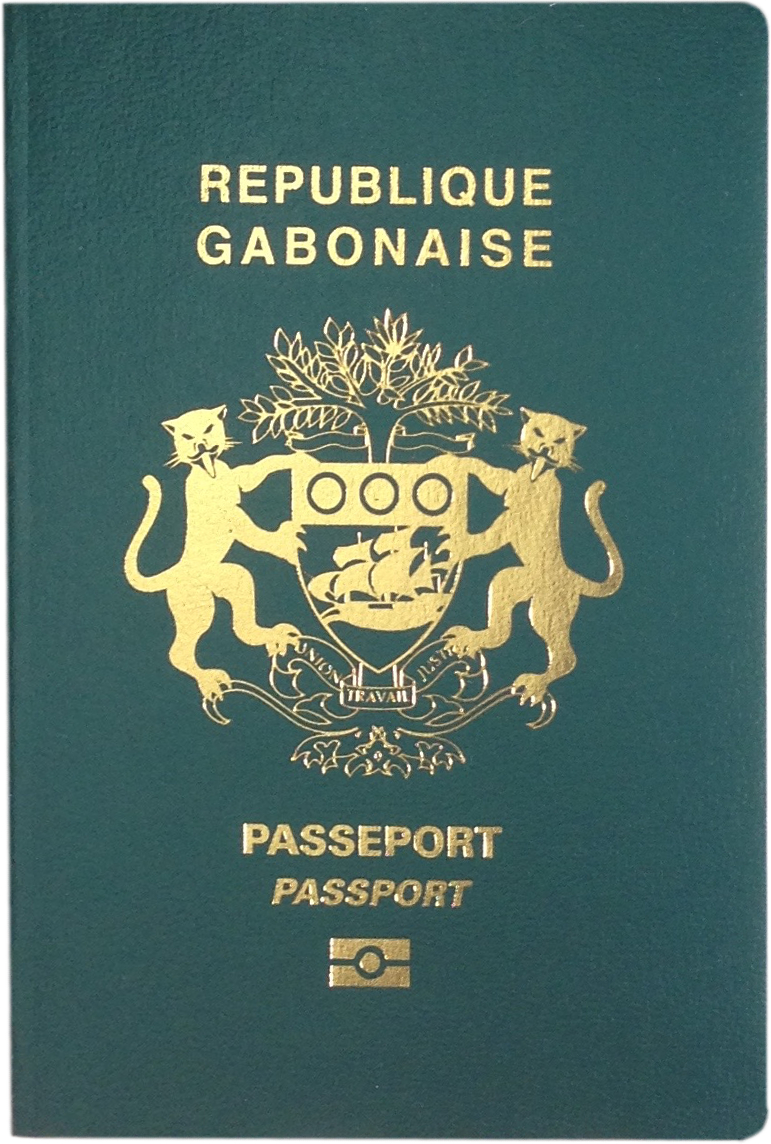
Gabon

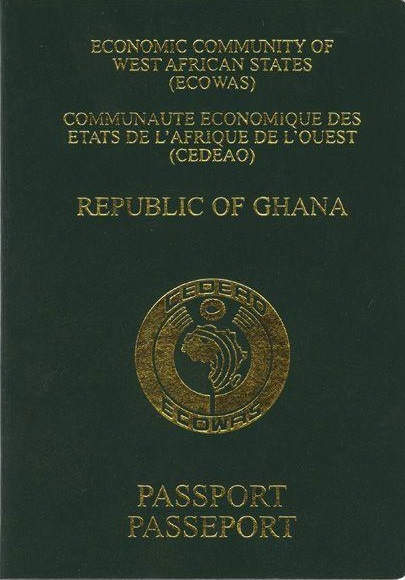
Ghana

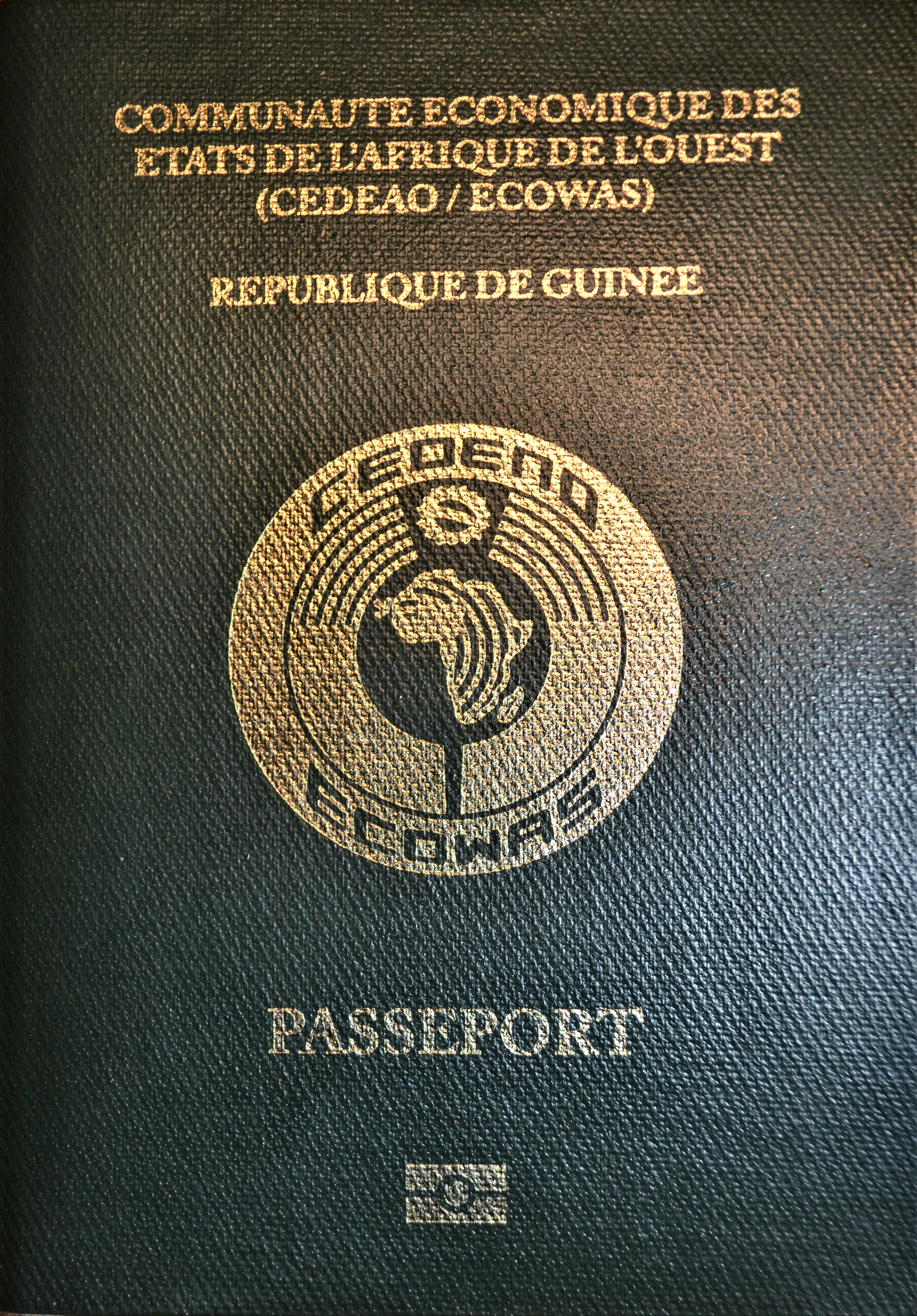
Guinea

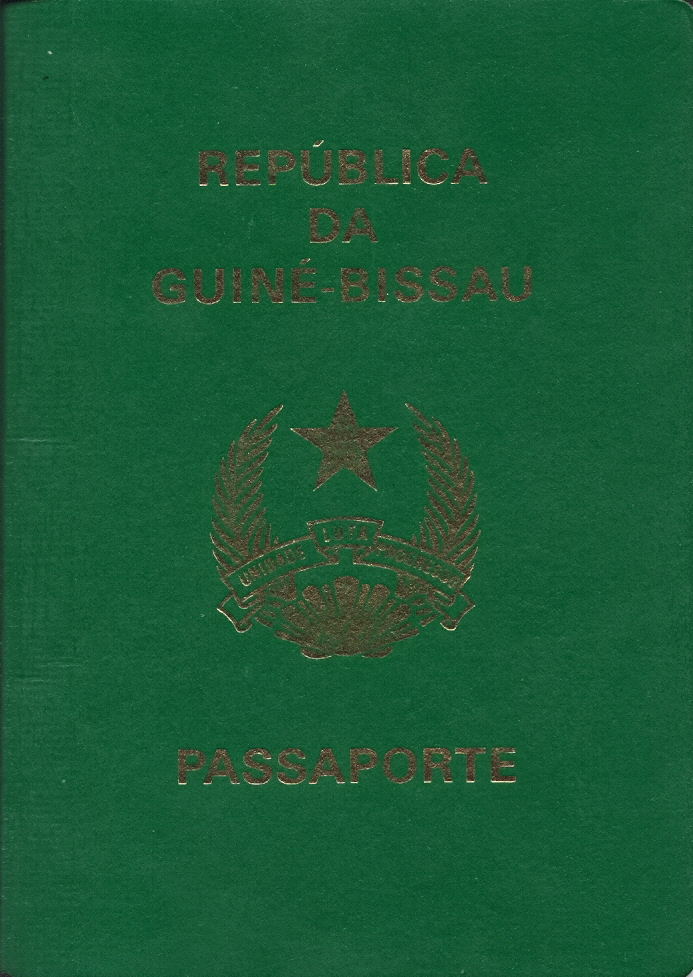
Guinea-Bissau

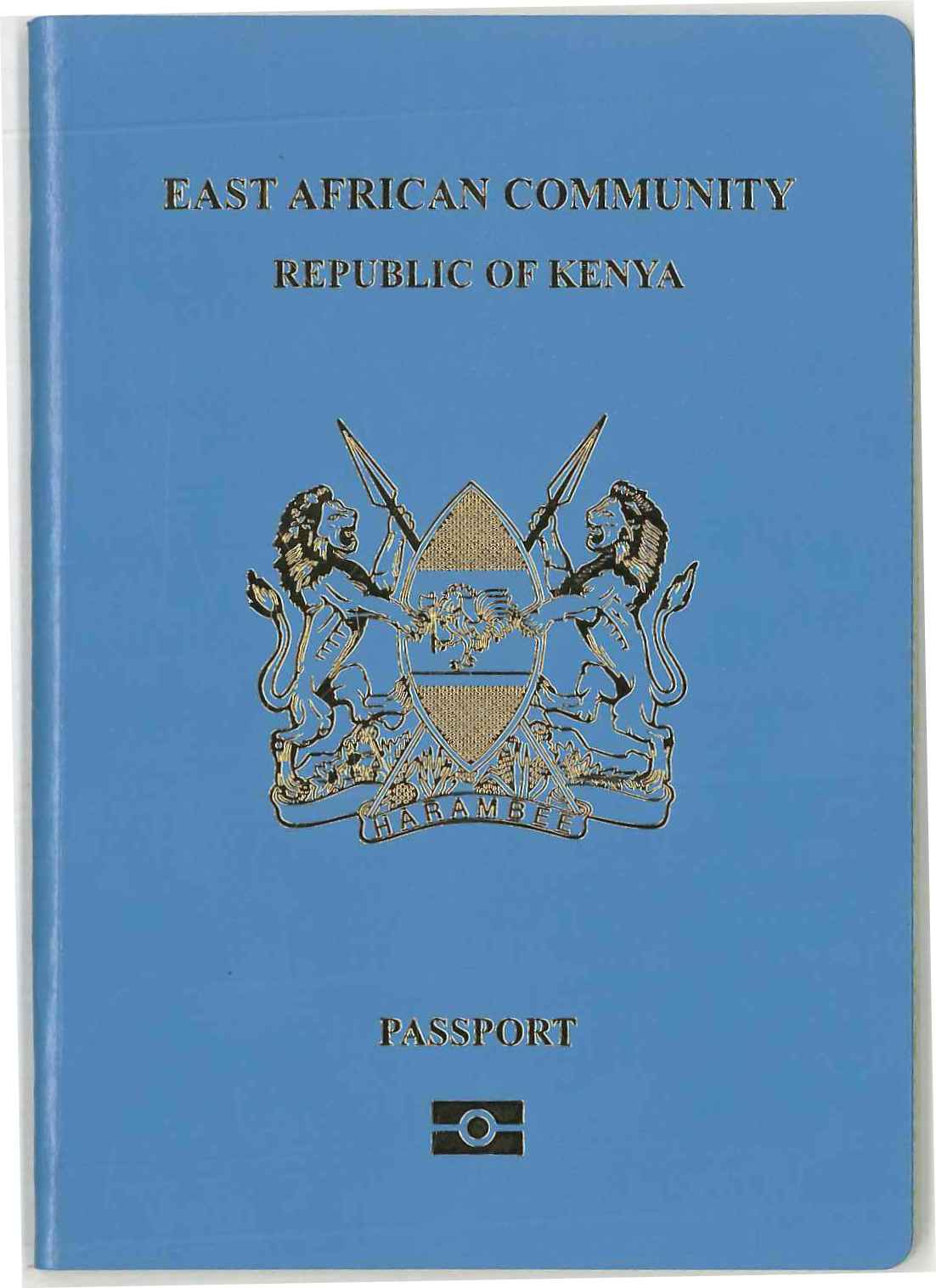
Kenya

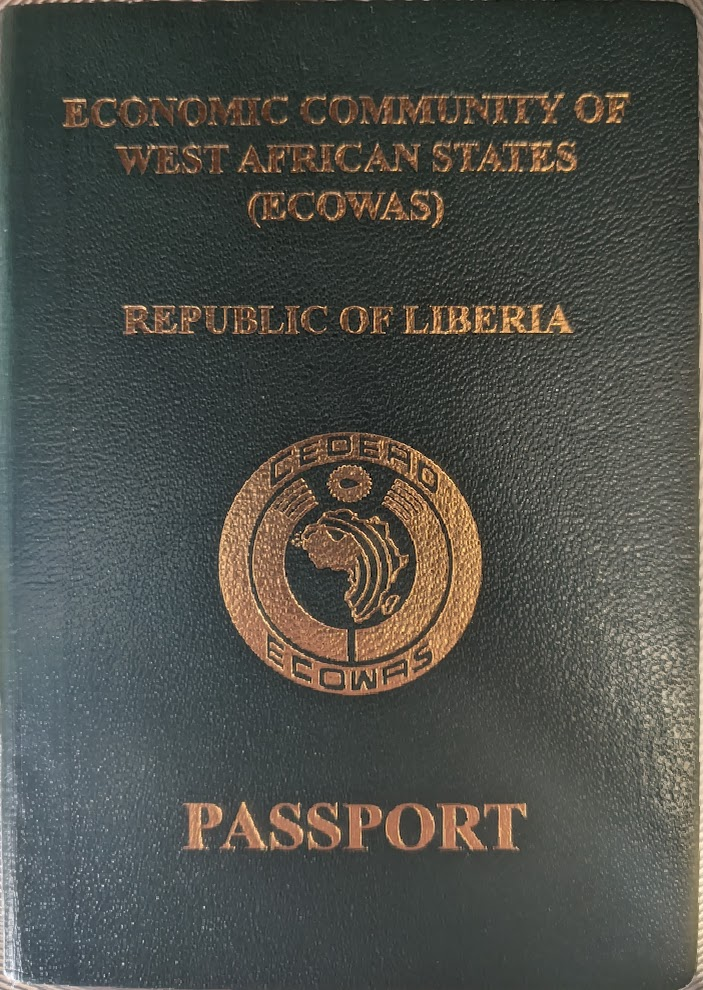
Liberia

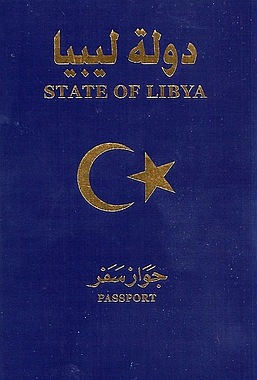
Libya

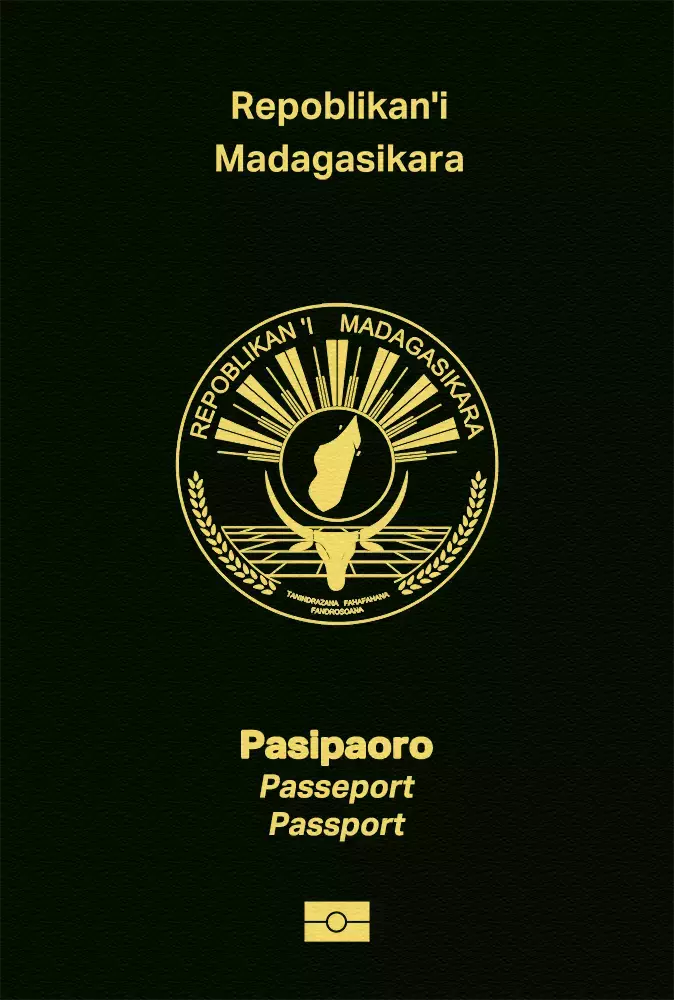
Madagascar

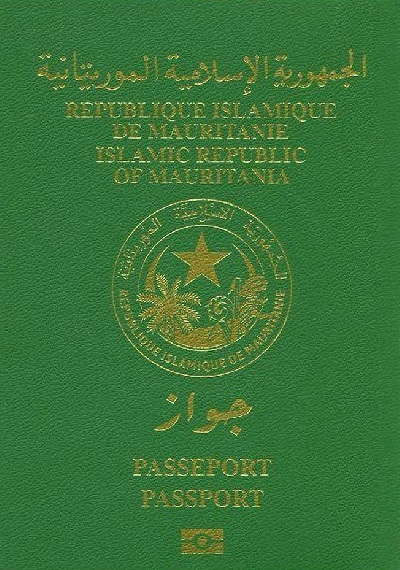
Mauritania

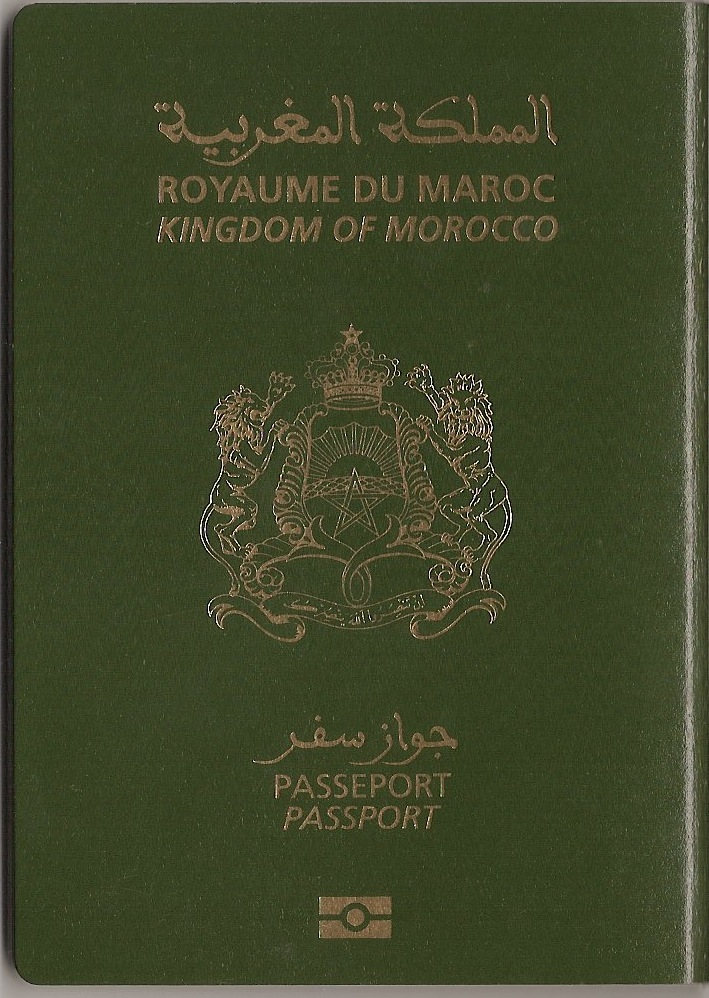
Morocco

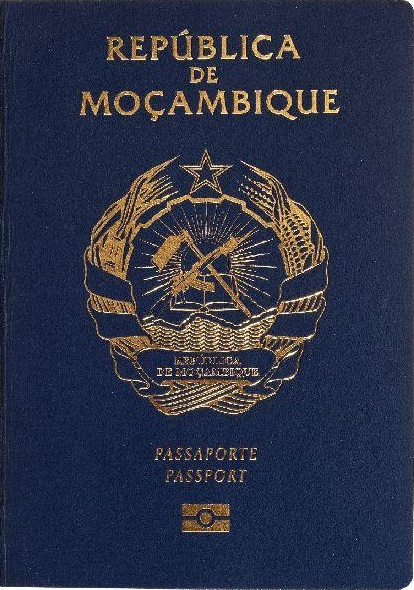
Mozambique

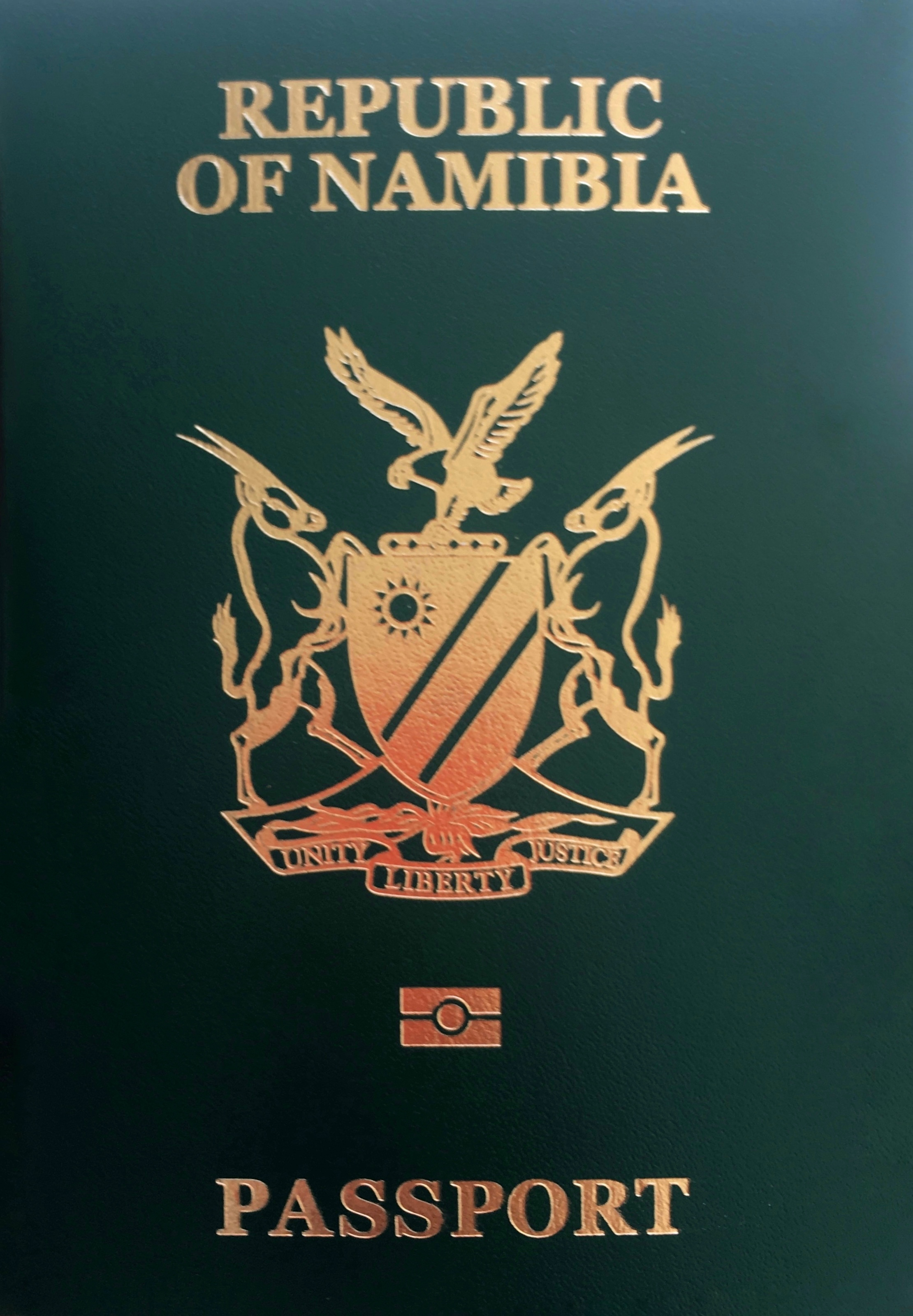
Namibia

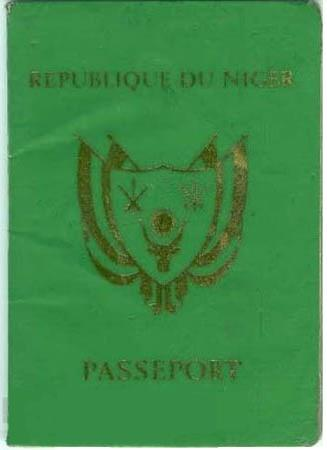
Niger

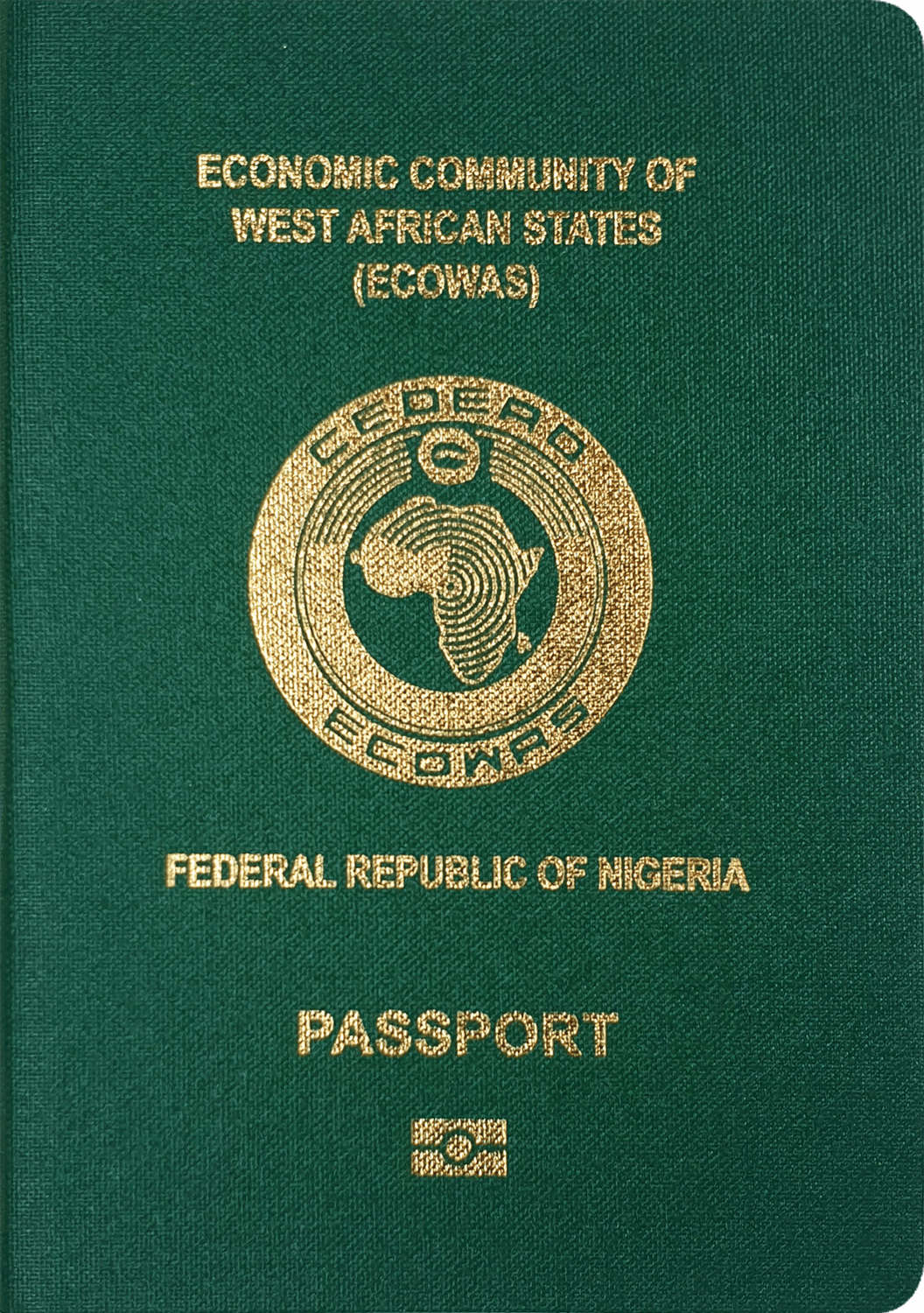
Nigeria

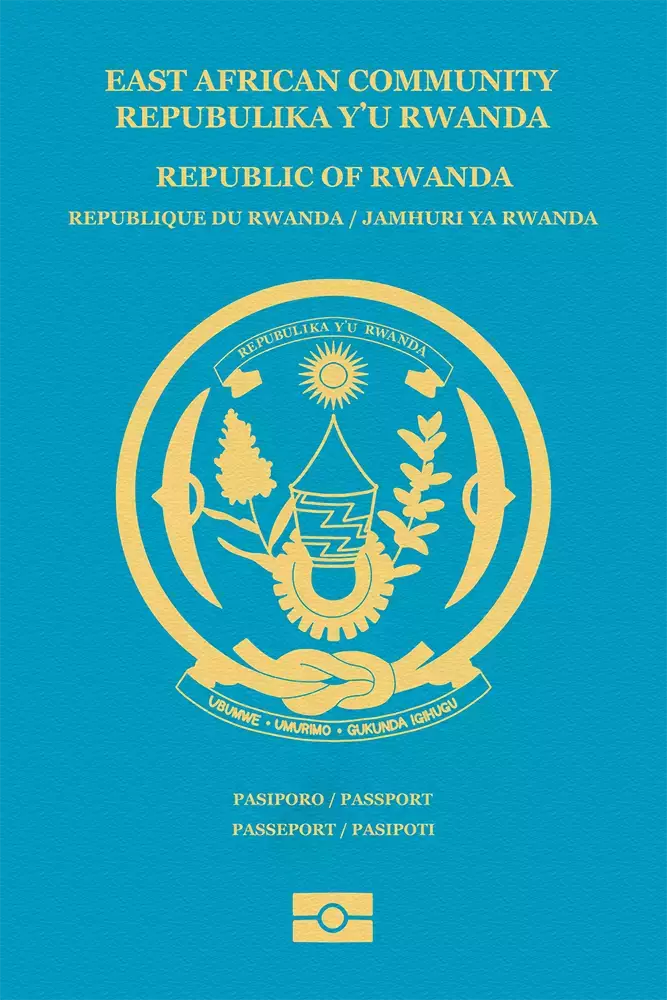
Rwanda

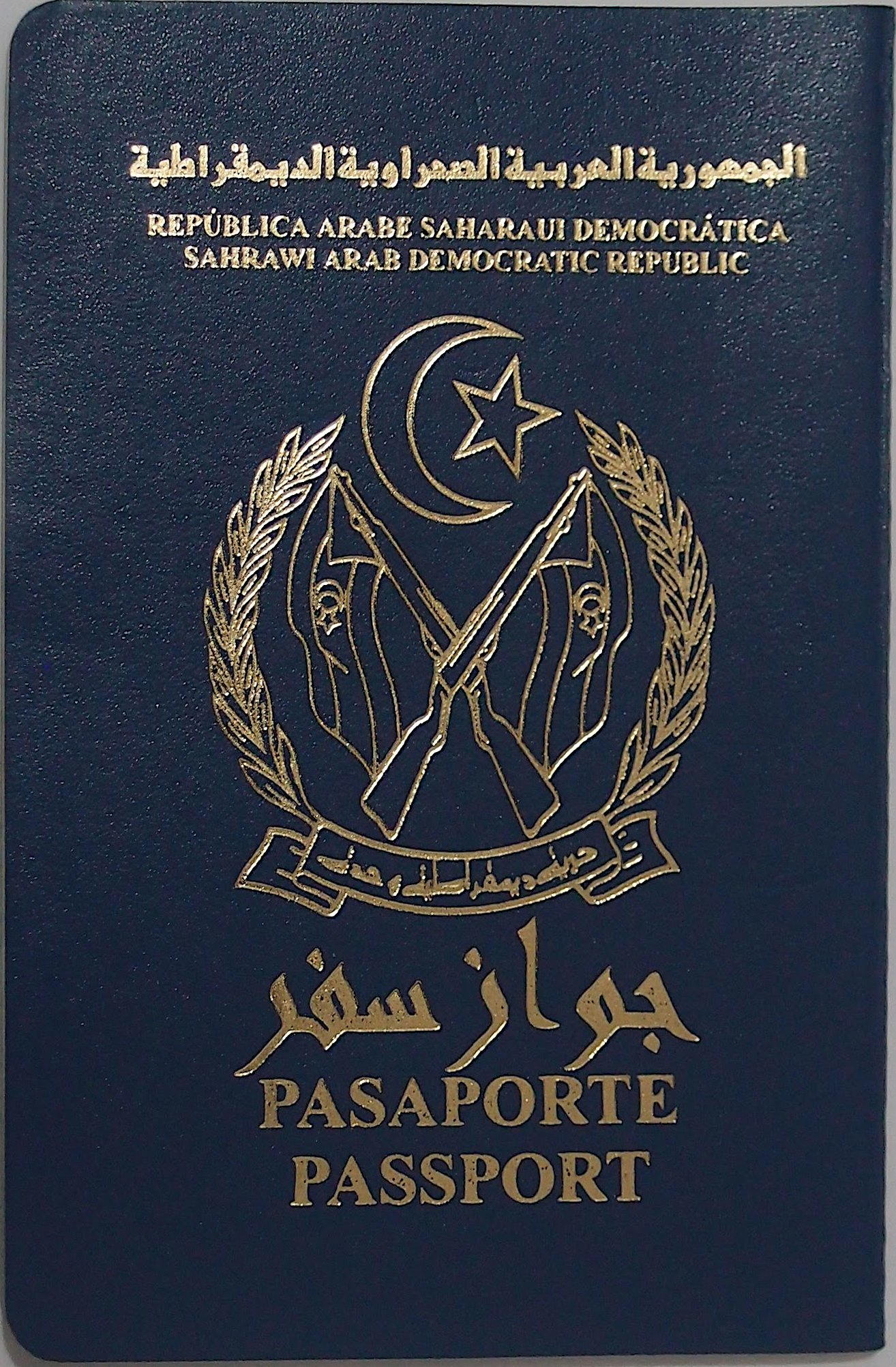
(Sahrawi Arab Democratic Republic) Sahrawi Republic

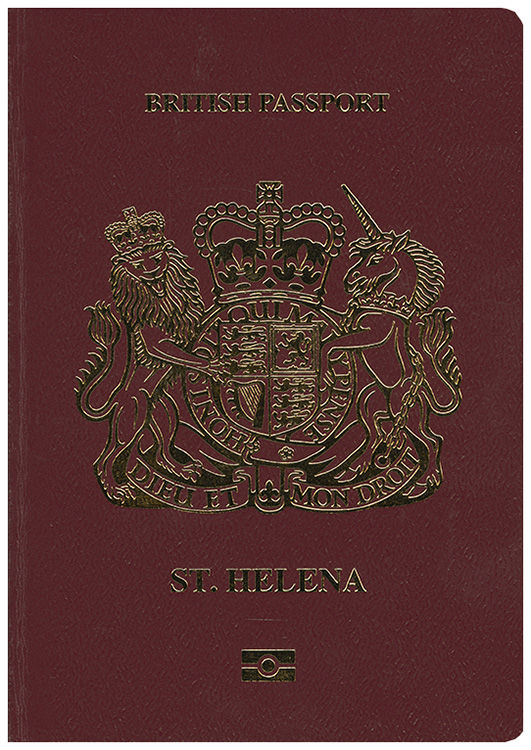
(United Kingdom) Saint Helena

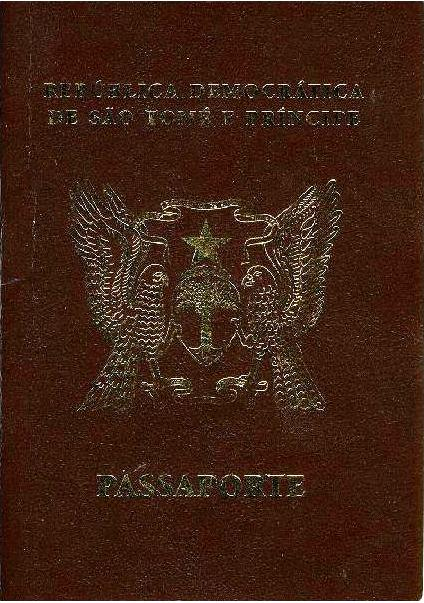
São Tomé and Príncipe

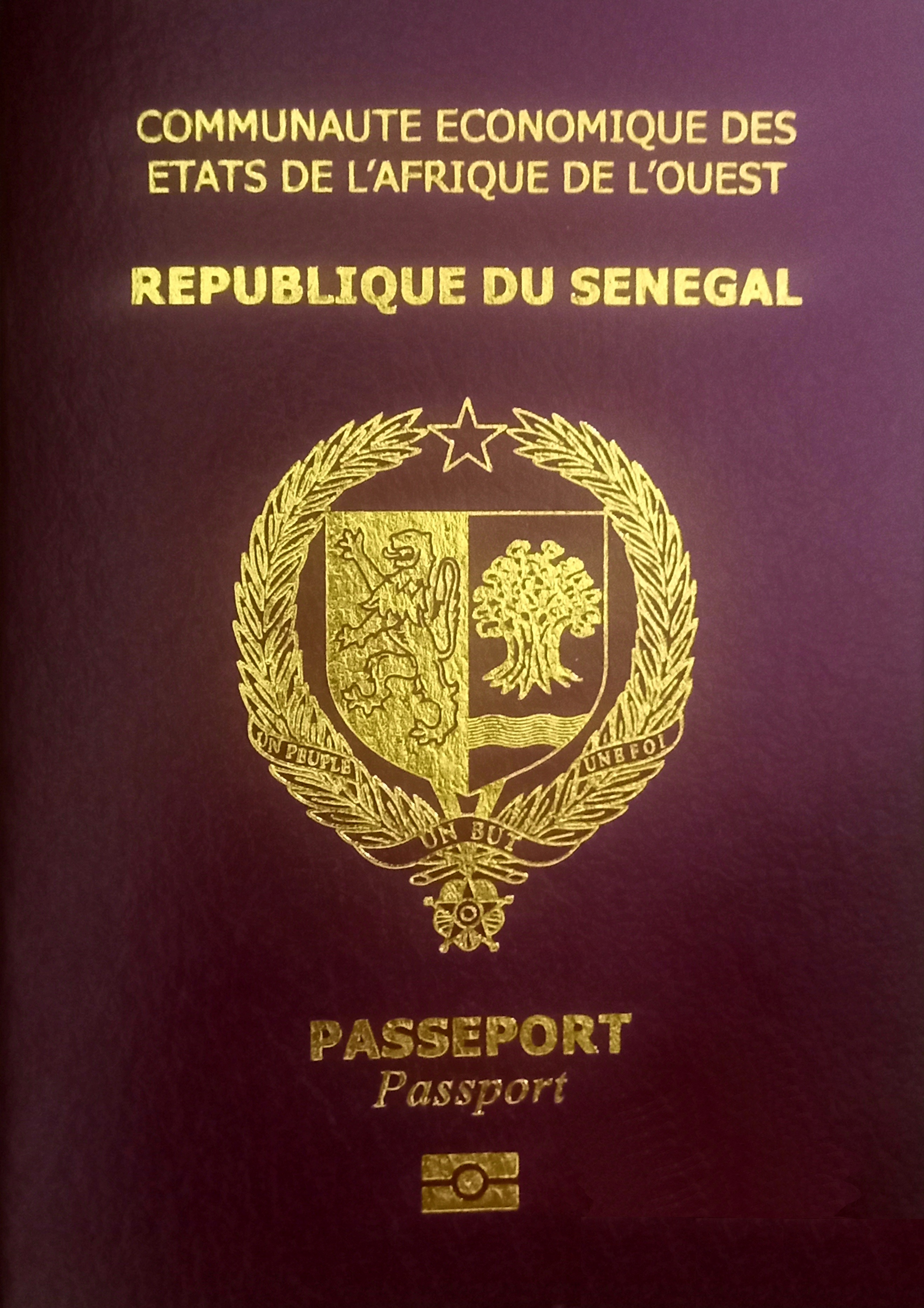
Senegal

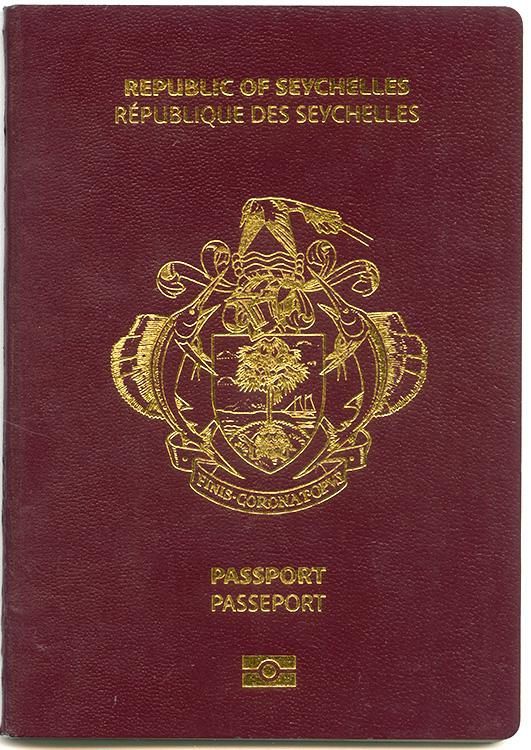
Seychelles

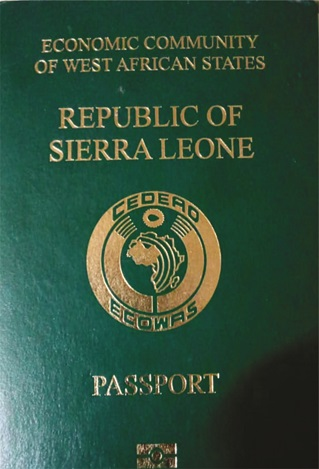
Sierra Leone

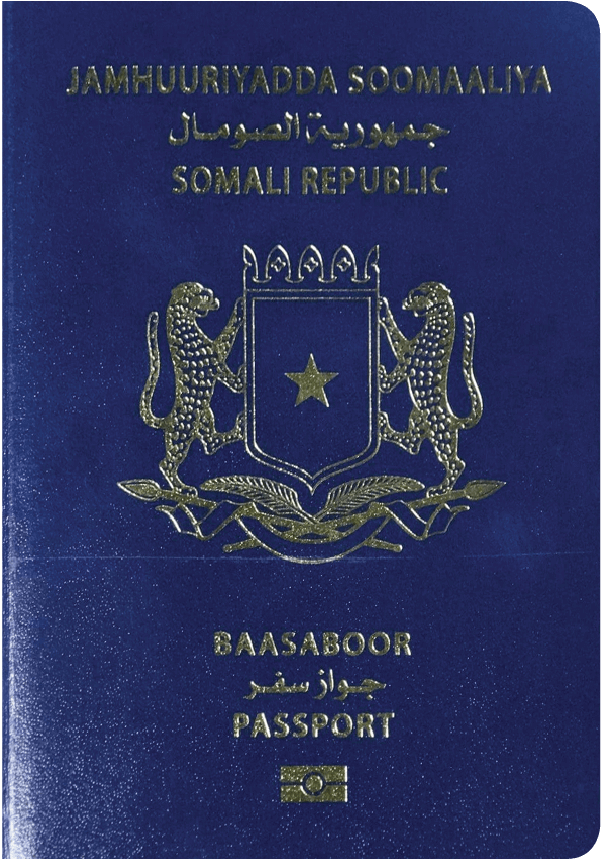
Somalia

Somaliland

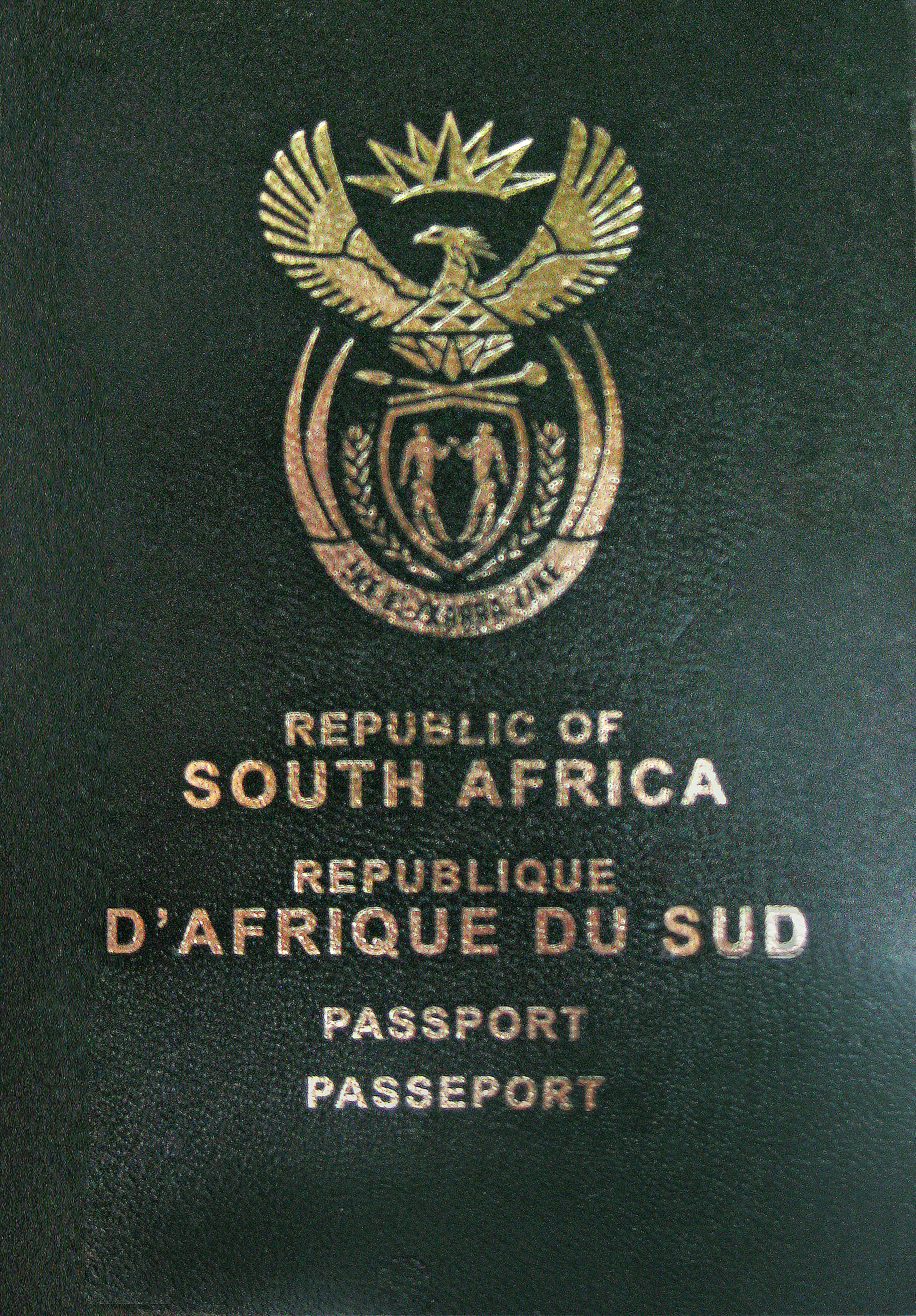
South Africa

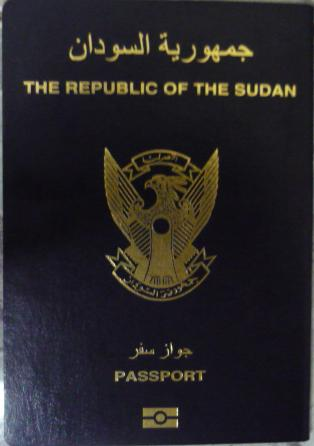
Sudan

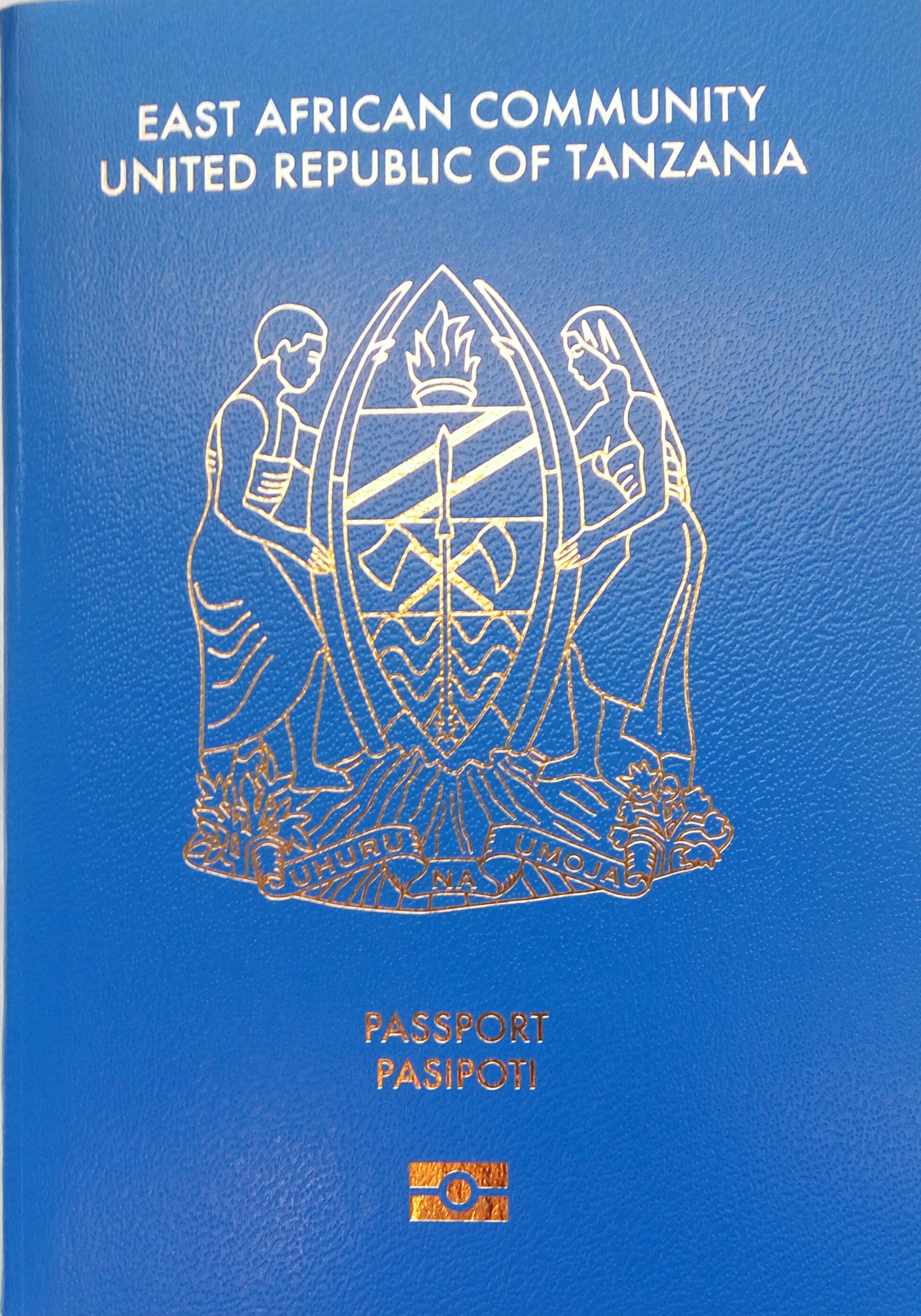
Tanzania

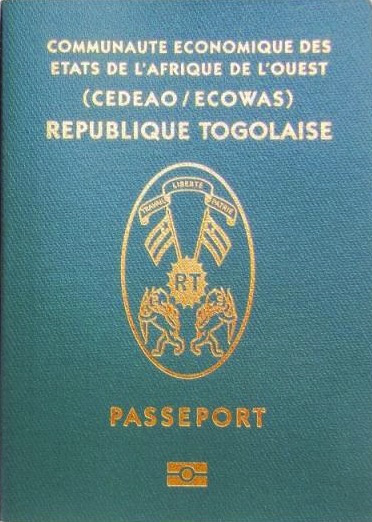
Togo

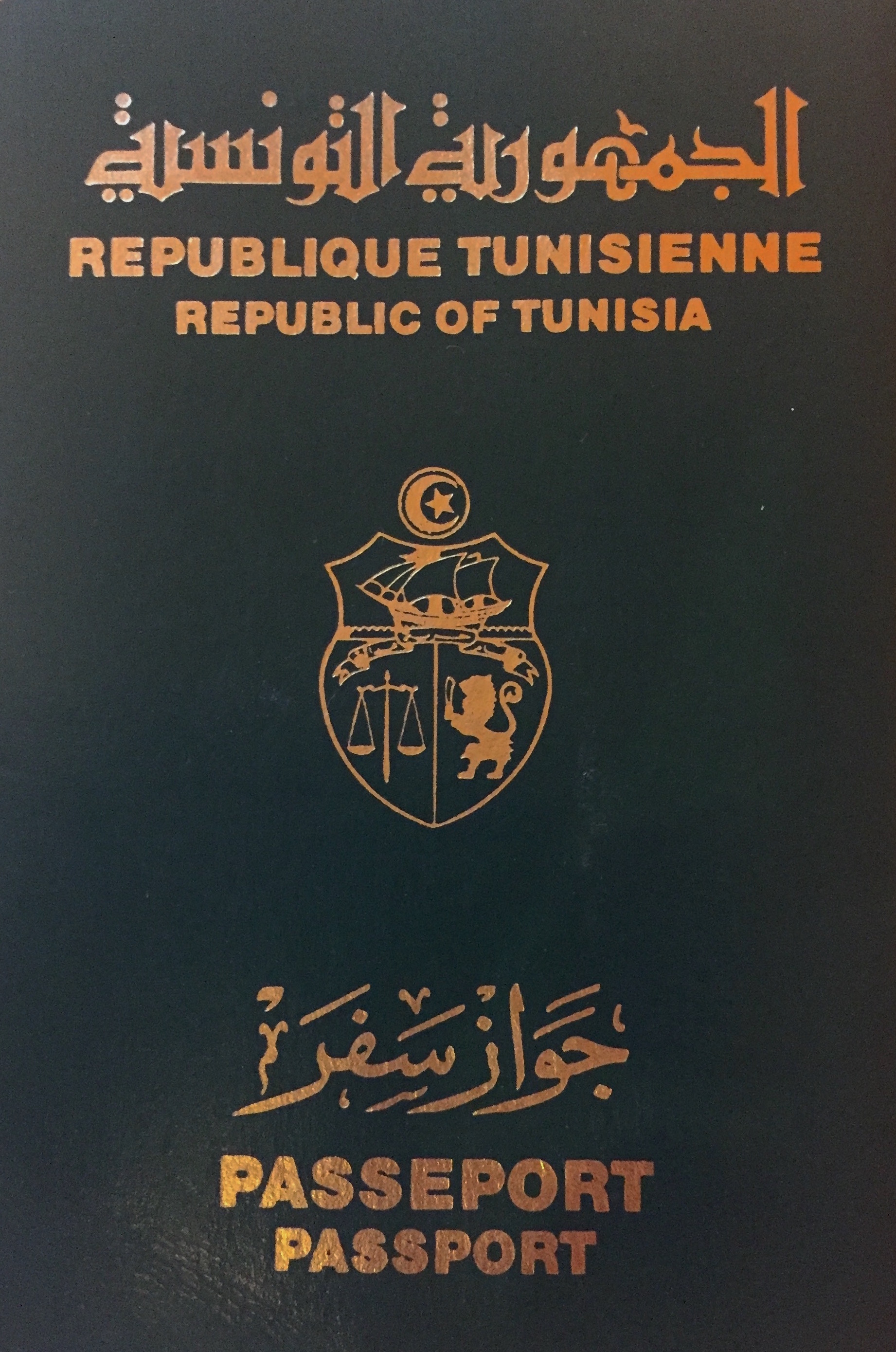
Tunisia

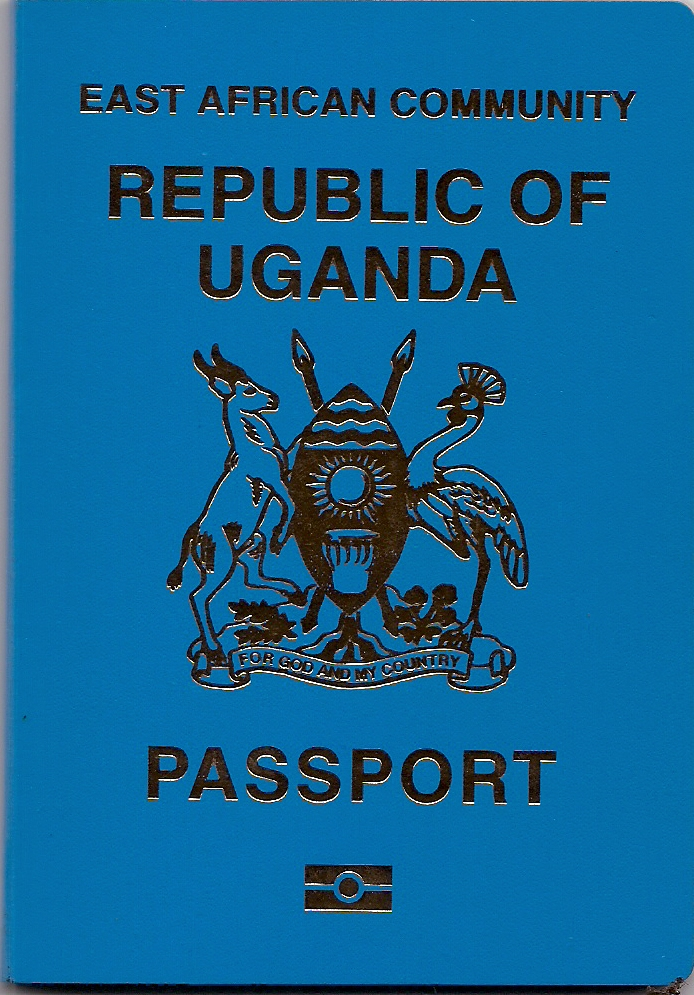
Uganda

=== North and Central America ===

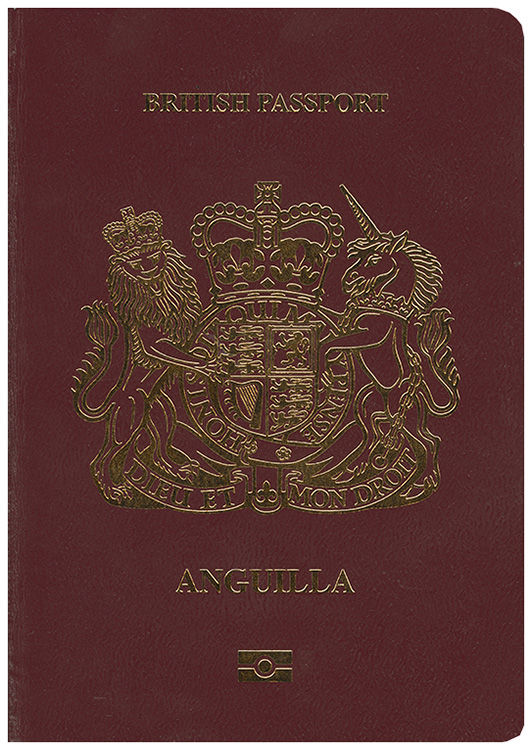
(United Kingdom) Anguilla

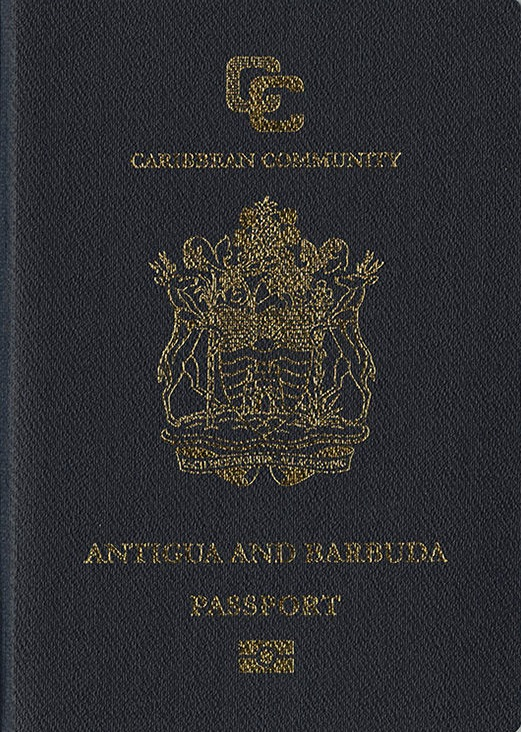
(Caribbean Community) Antigua and Barbuda

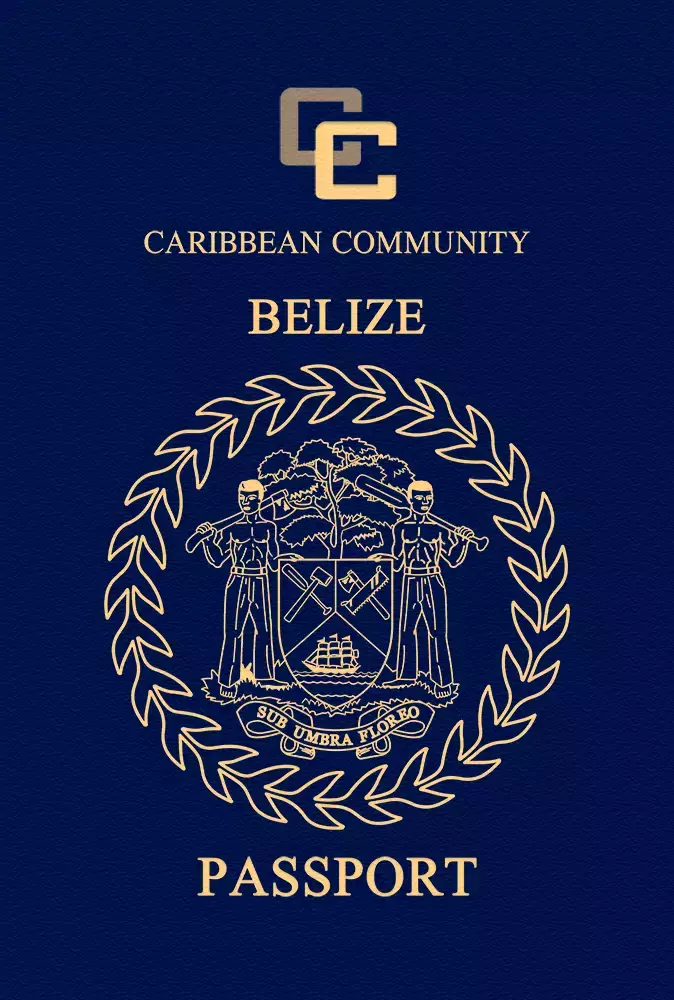
(Caribbean Community) Belize

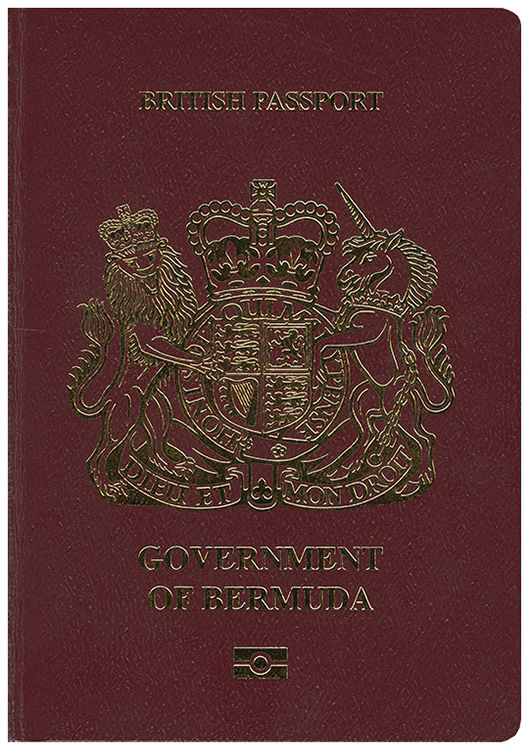
(United Kingdom) Bermuda

Canada

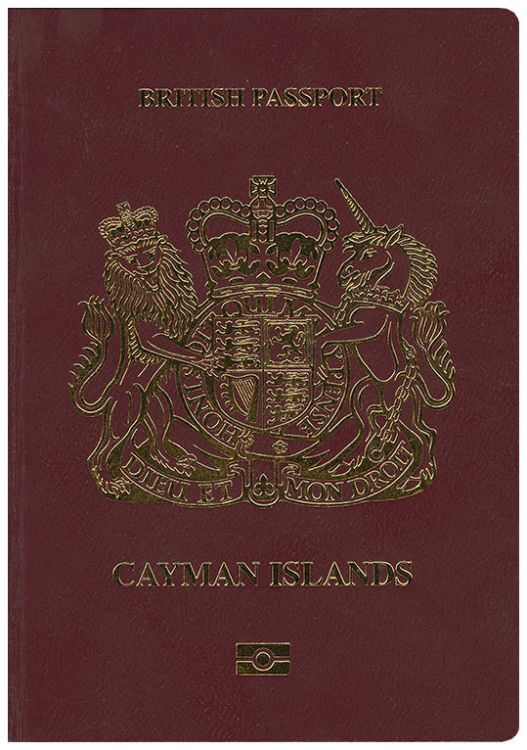
(United Kingdom) Cayman Islands

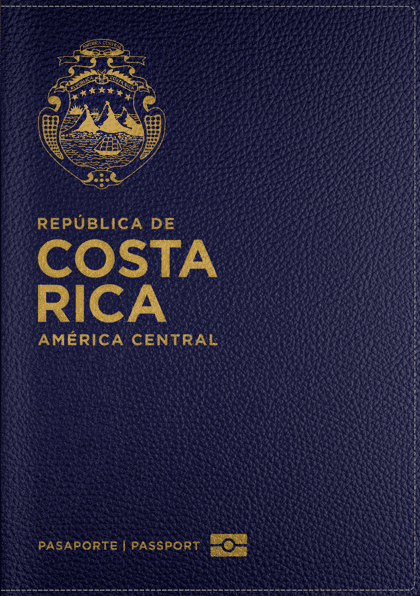
Costa Rica

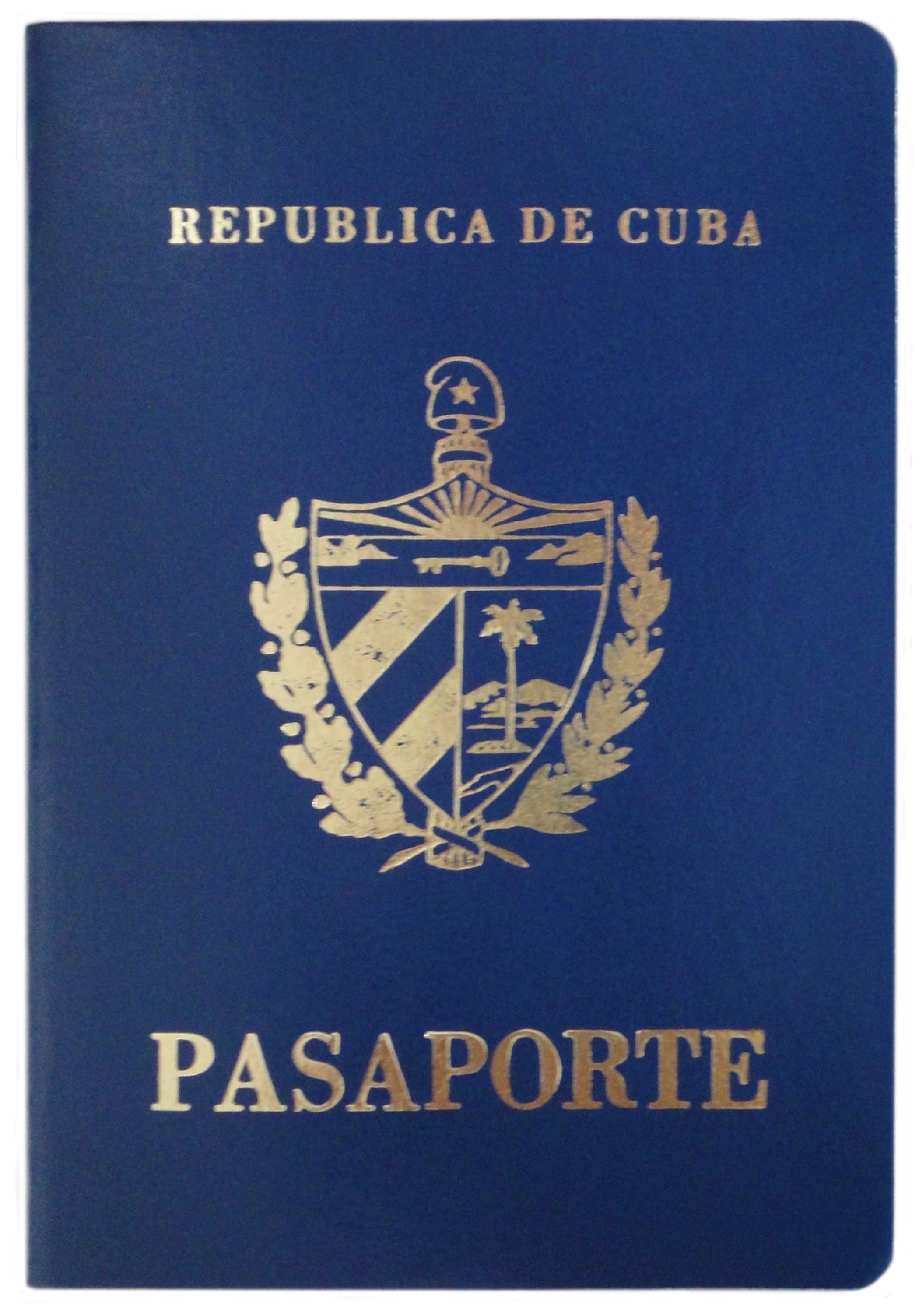
Cuba

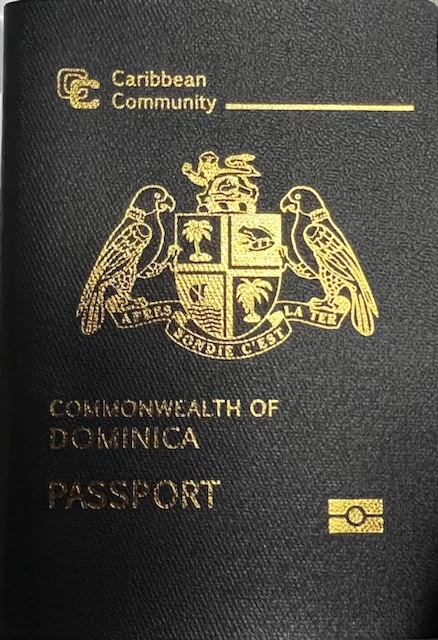
(Caribbean Community) Dominica

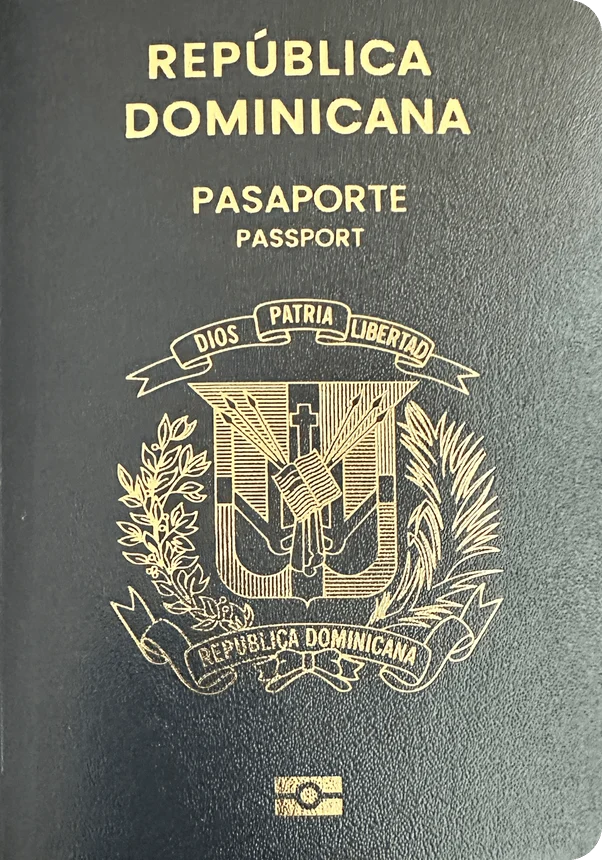
Dominican Republic

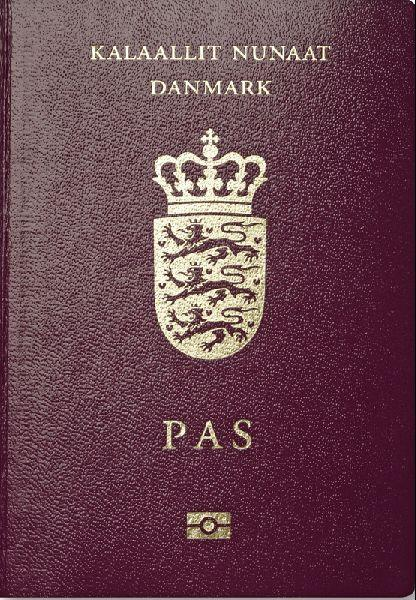
(Danish Realm) Greenland

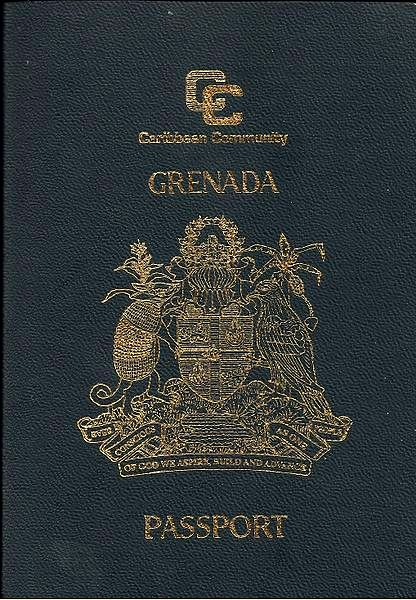
(Caribbean Community) Grenada

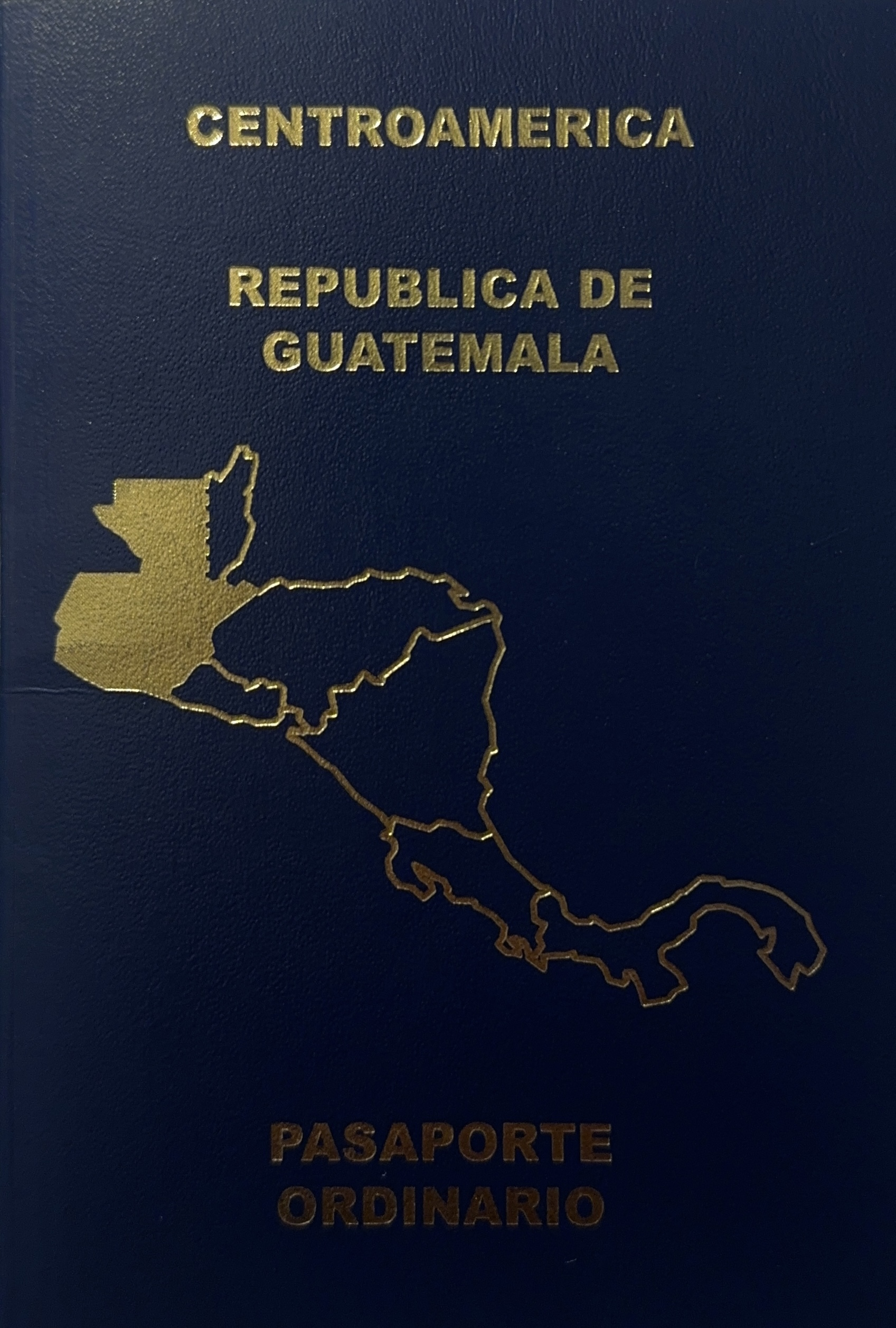
(Central American Integration System) Guatemala

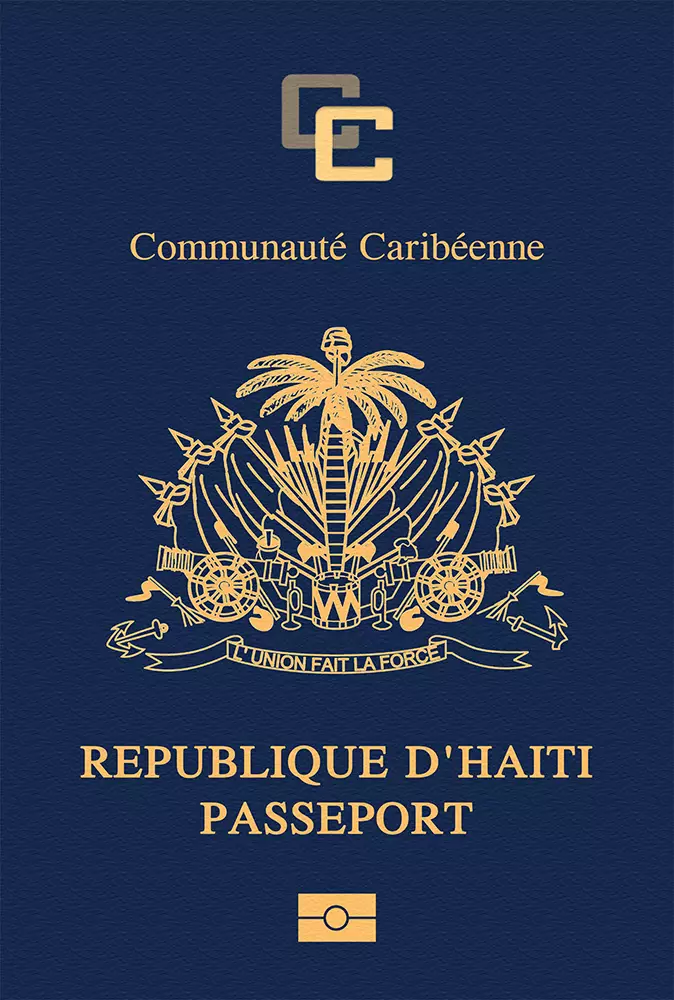
(Caribbean Community) Haiti

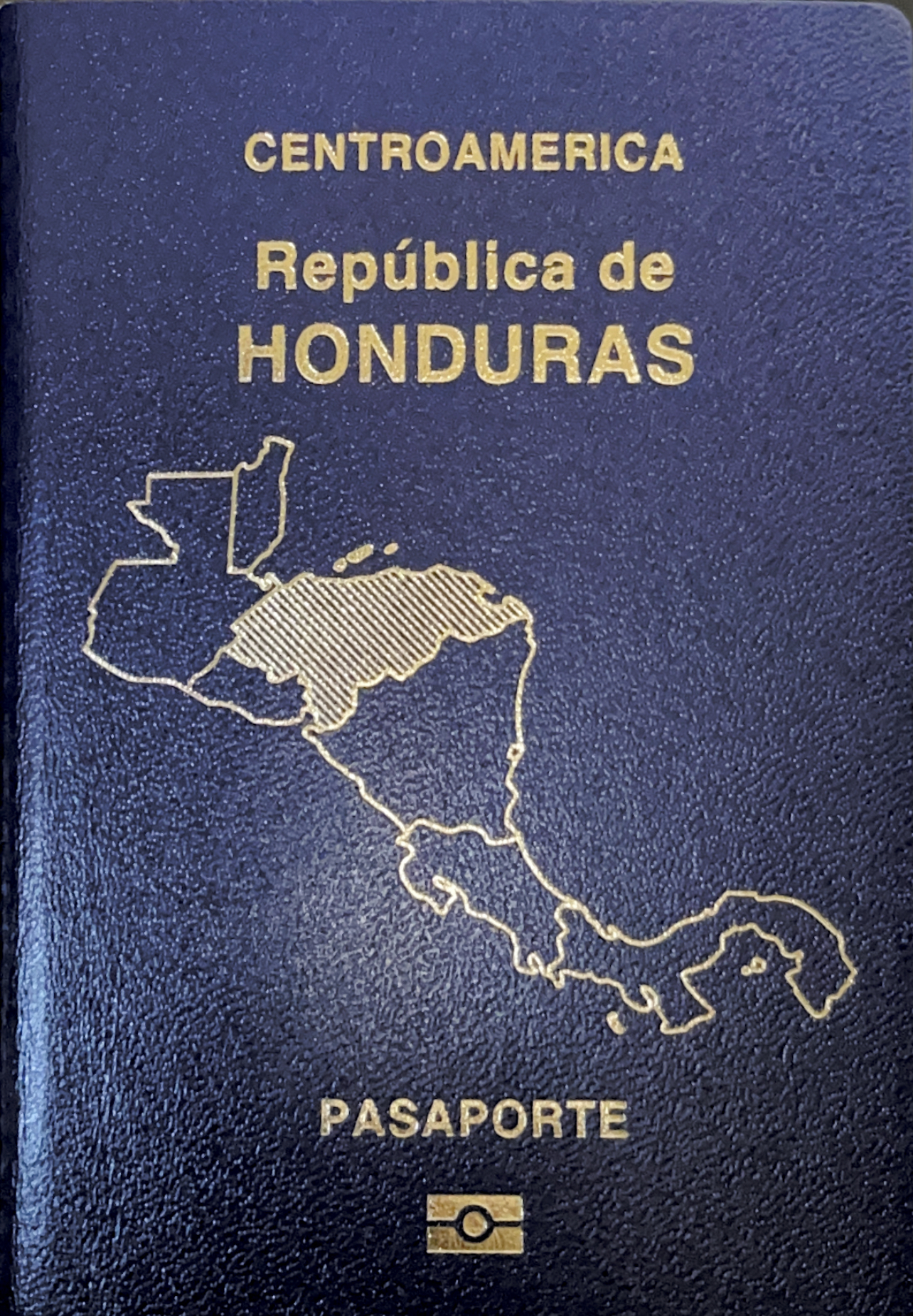
(Central American Integration System) Honduras

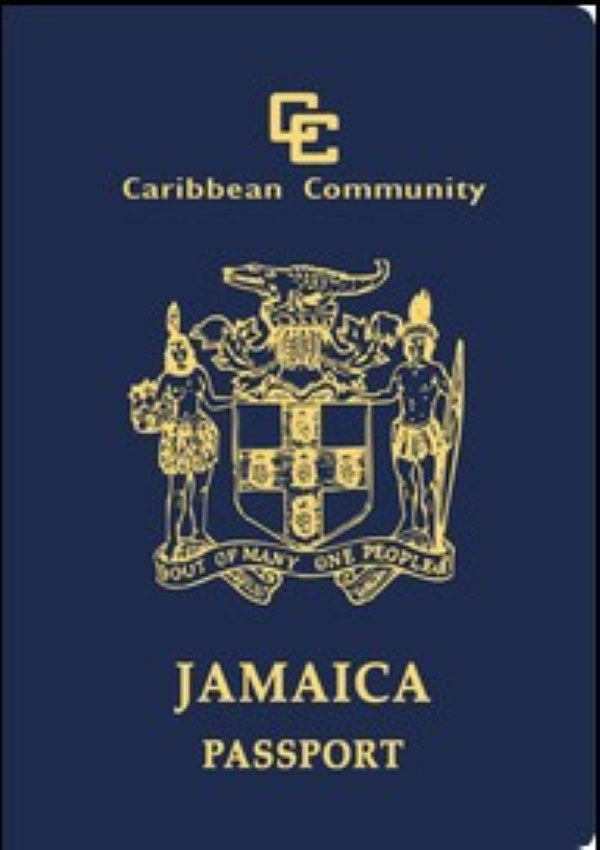
(Caribbean Community) Jamaica

Mexico

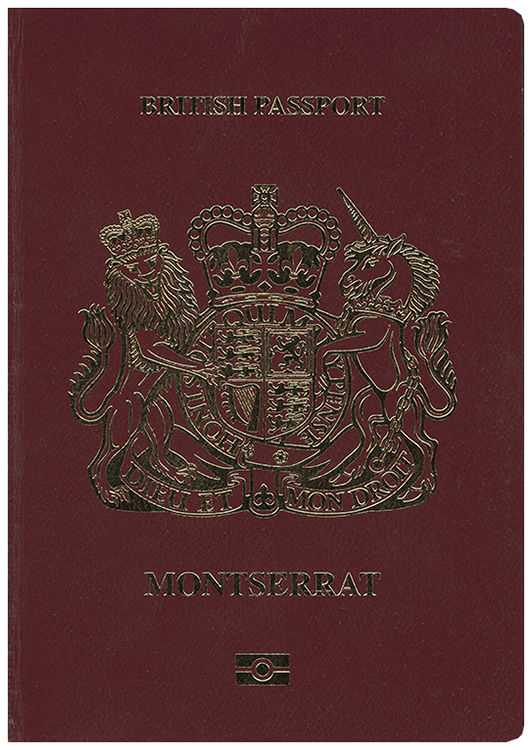
(United Kingdom) (Caribbean Community) Montserrat

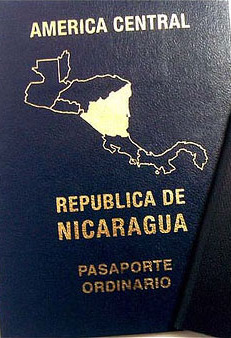
(Central American Integration System) Nicaragua

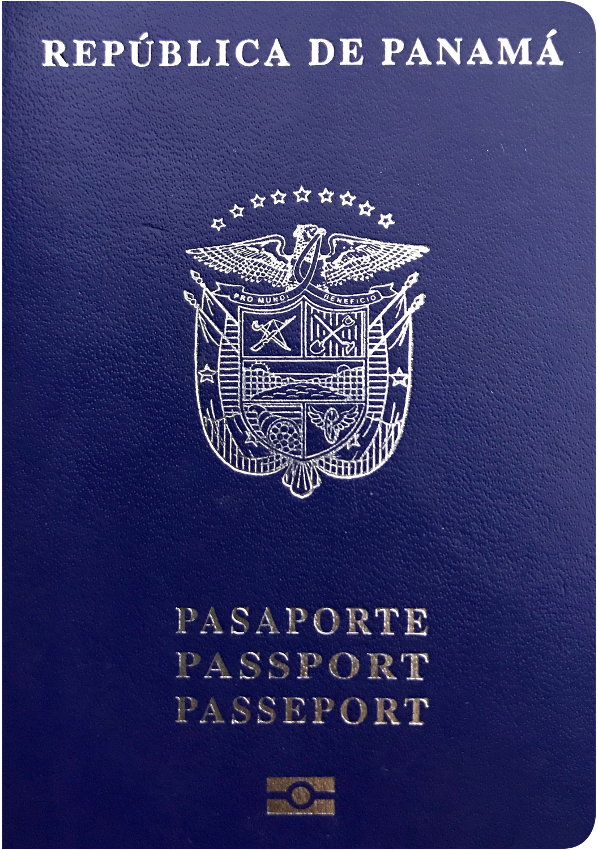
Panama

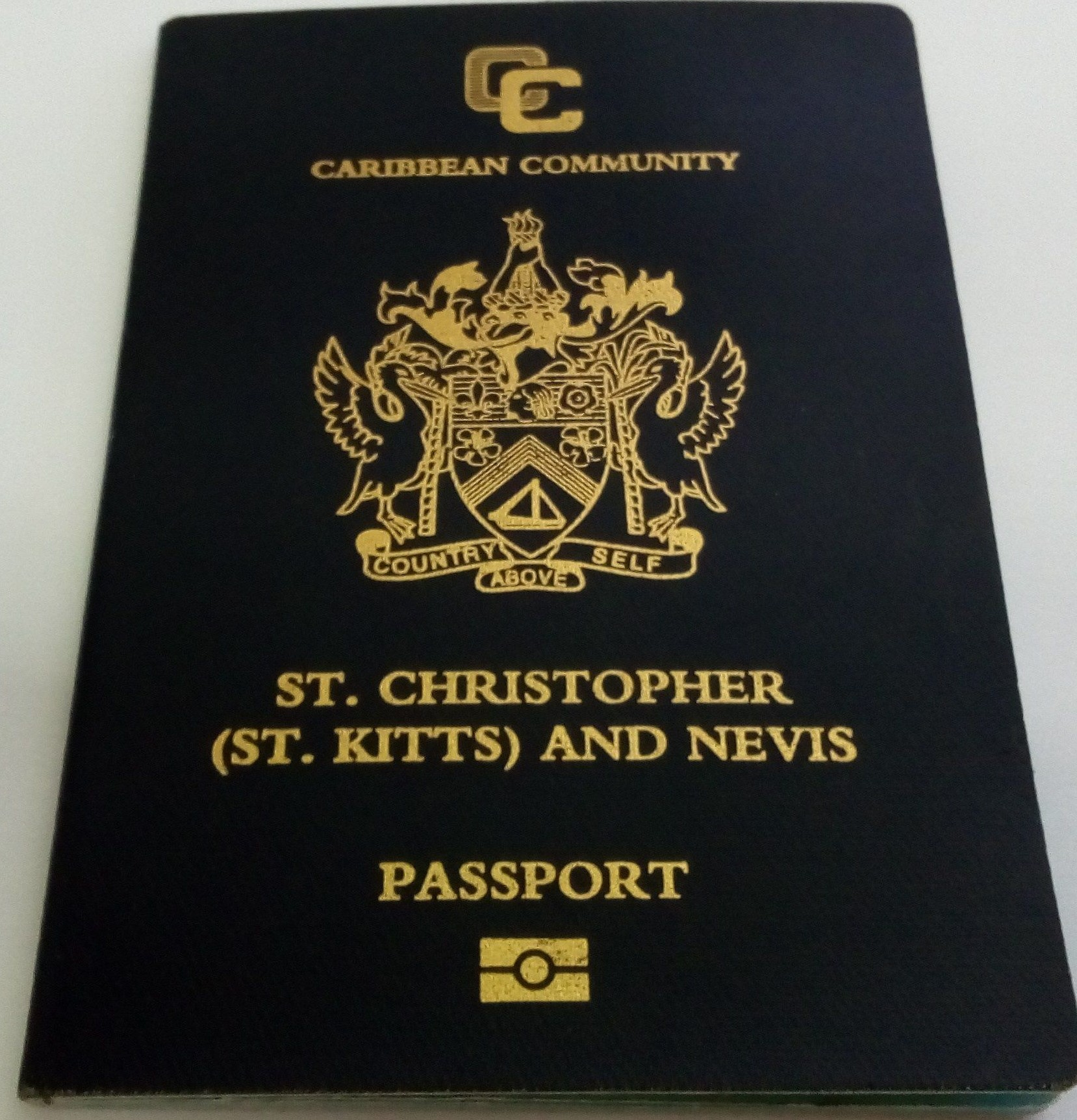
(Caribbean Community) Saint Kitts and Nevis

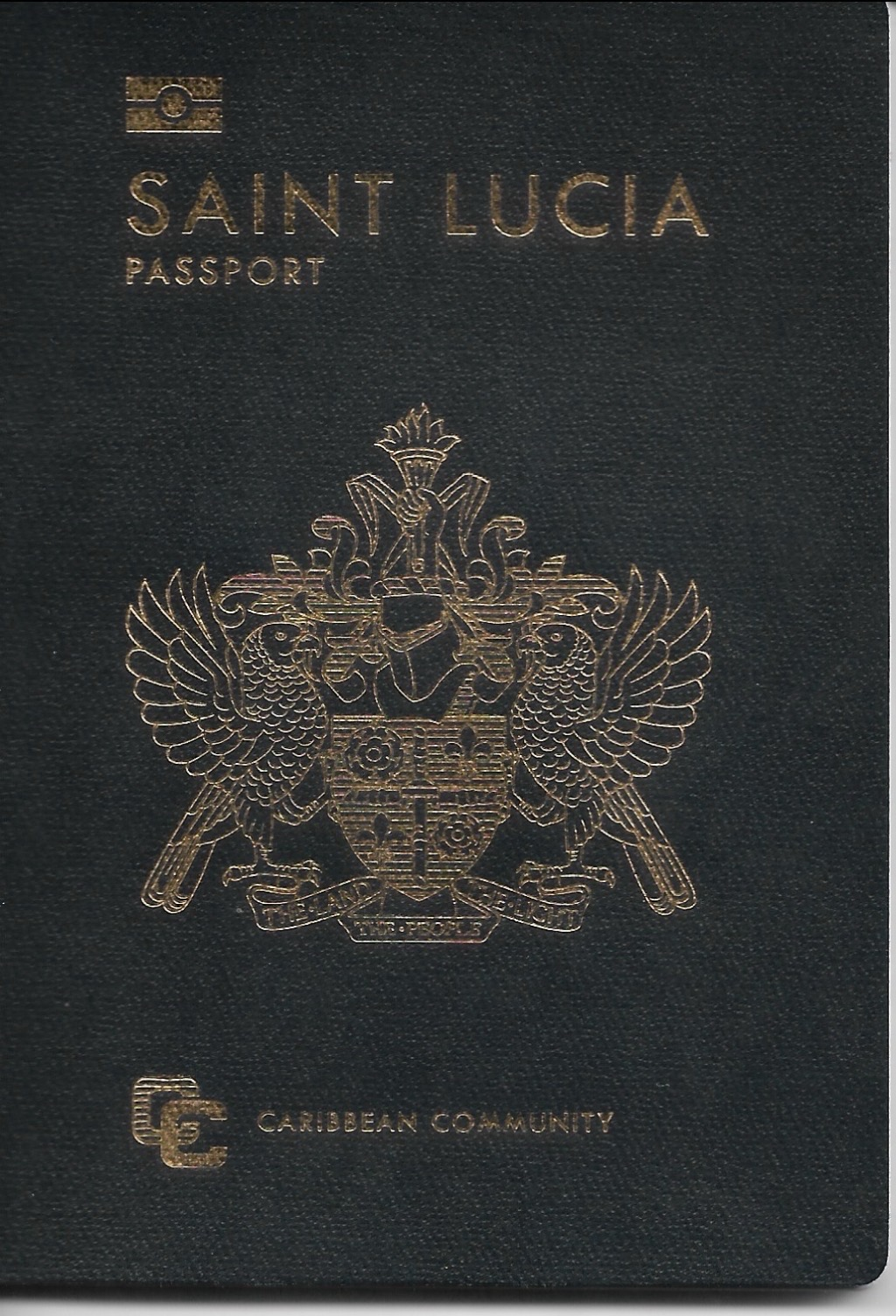
(Caribbean Community) Saint Lucia

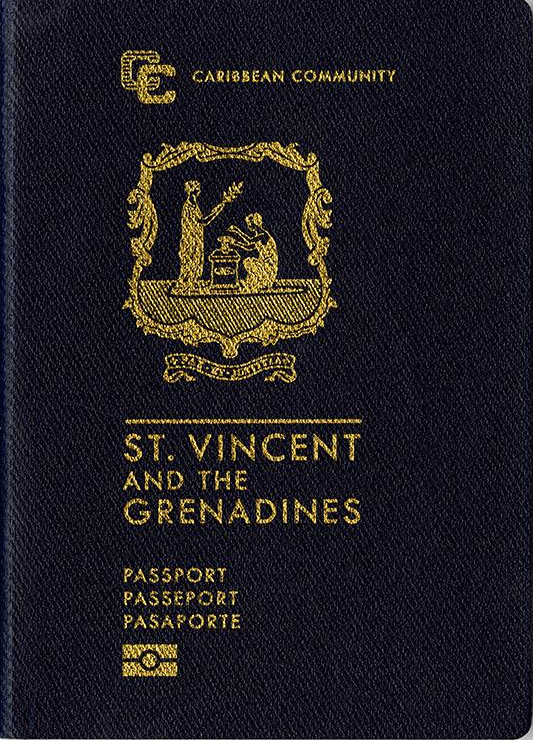
(Caribbean Community) Saint Vincent and the Grenadines

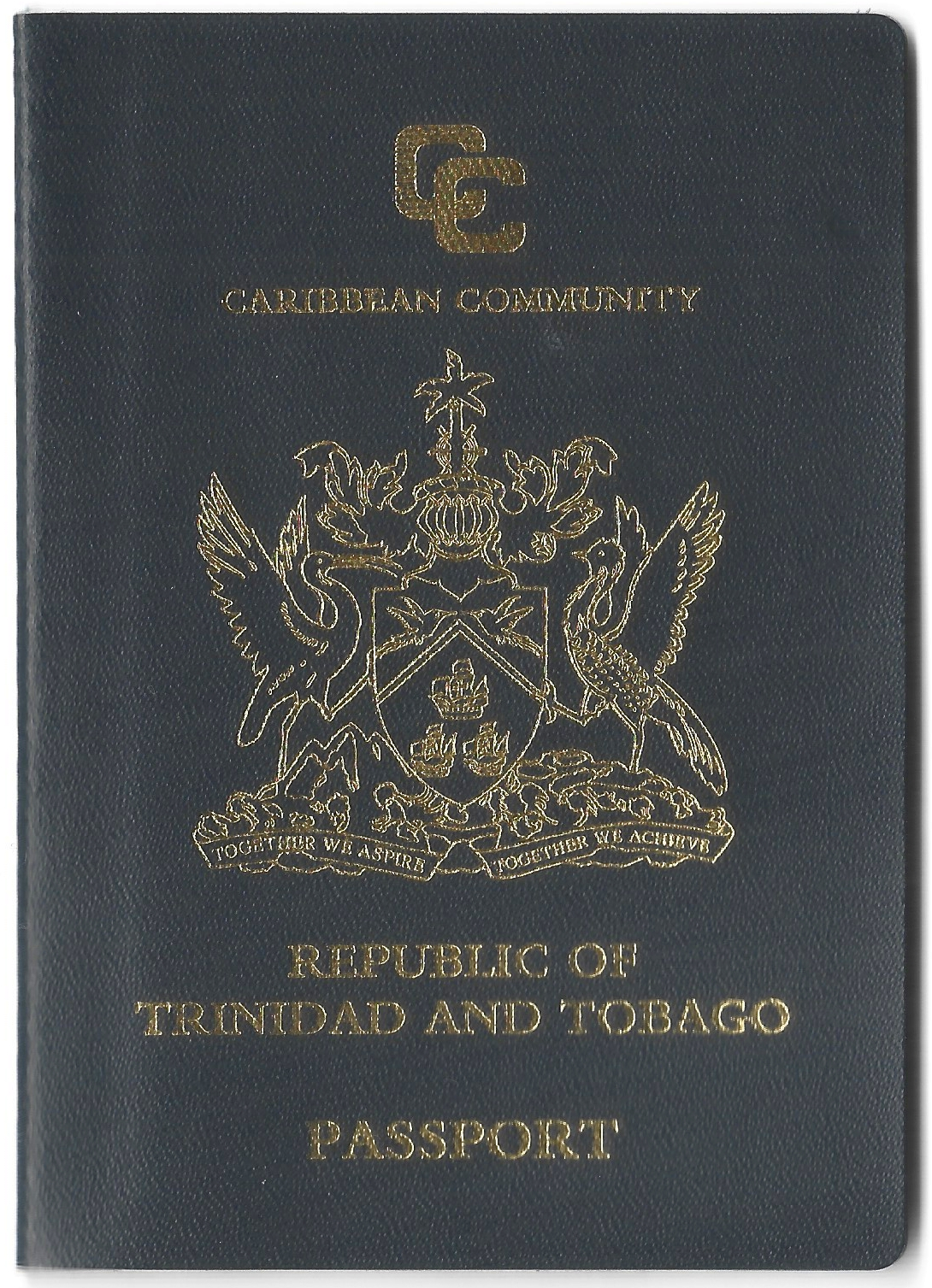
(Caribbean Community) Trinidad and Tobago

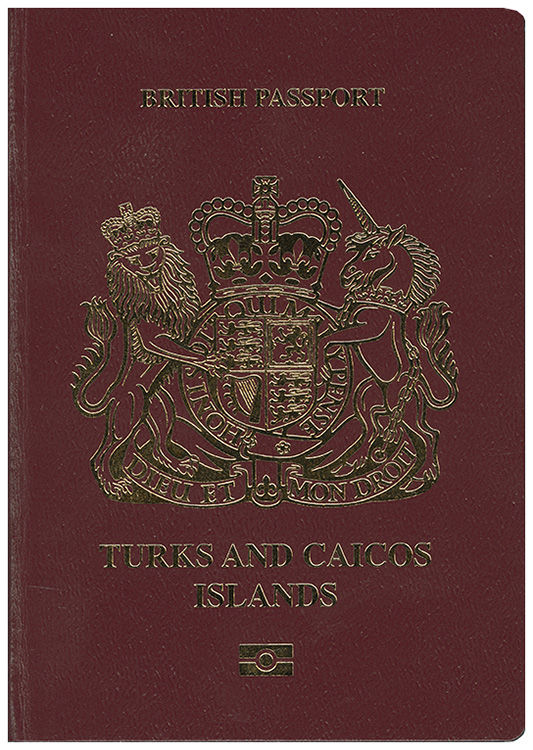
(United Kingdom) Turks and Caicos Islands

United States

=== South America ===

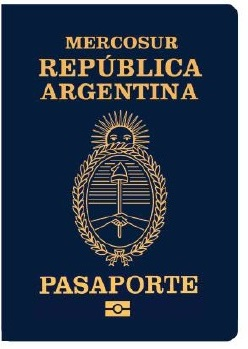
(Mercosur) Argentina

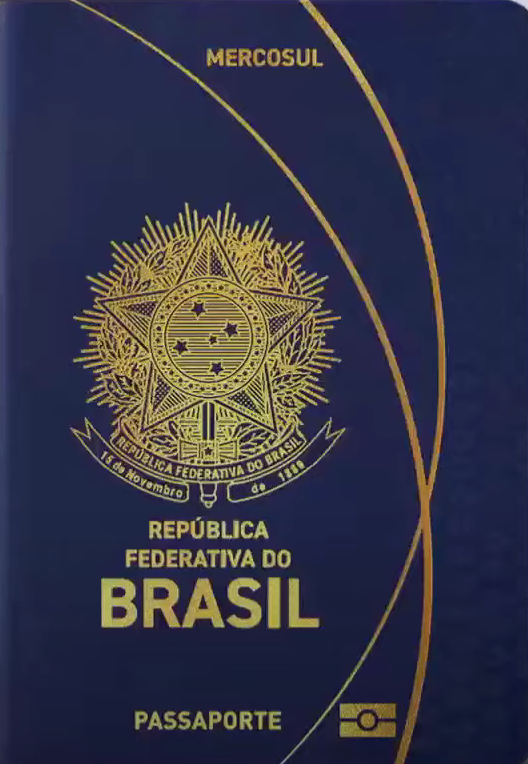
(Mercosur) Brazil

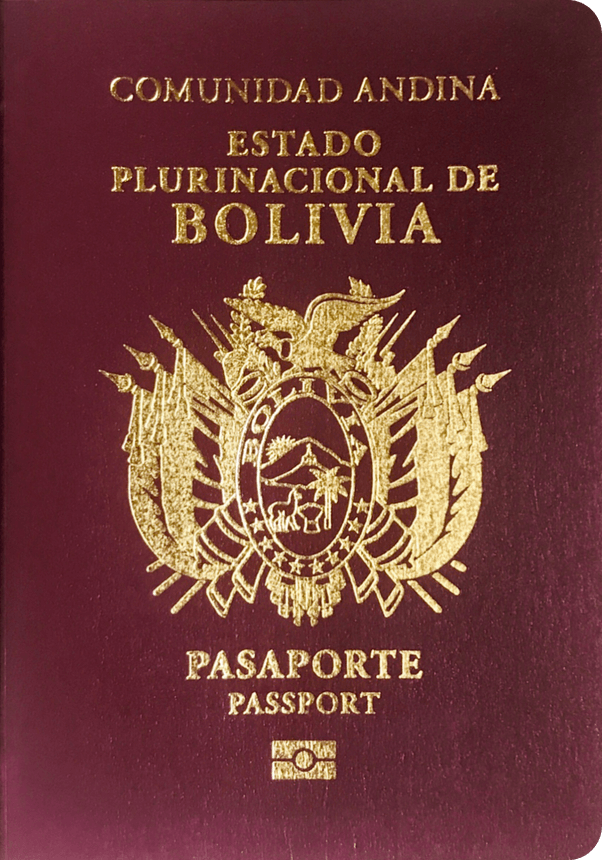
(Andean Community) Bolivia

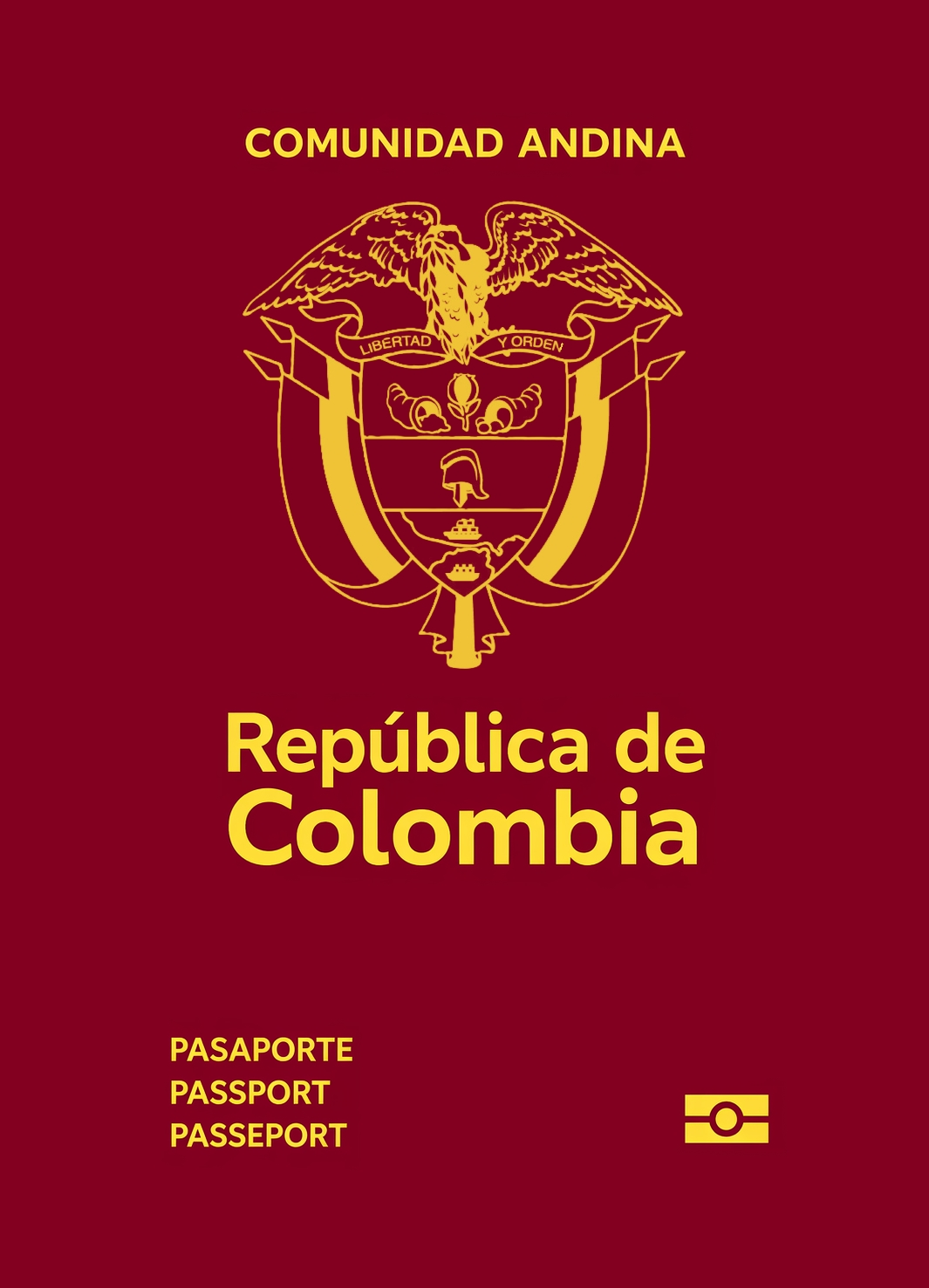
(Andean Community) Colombia

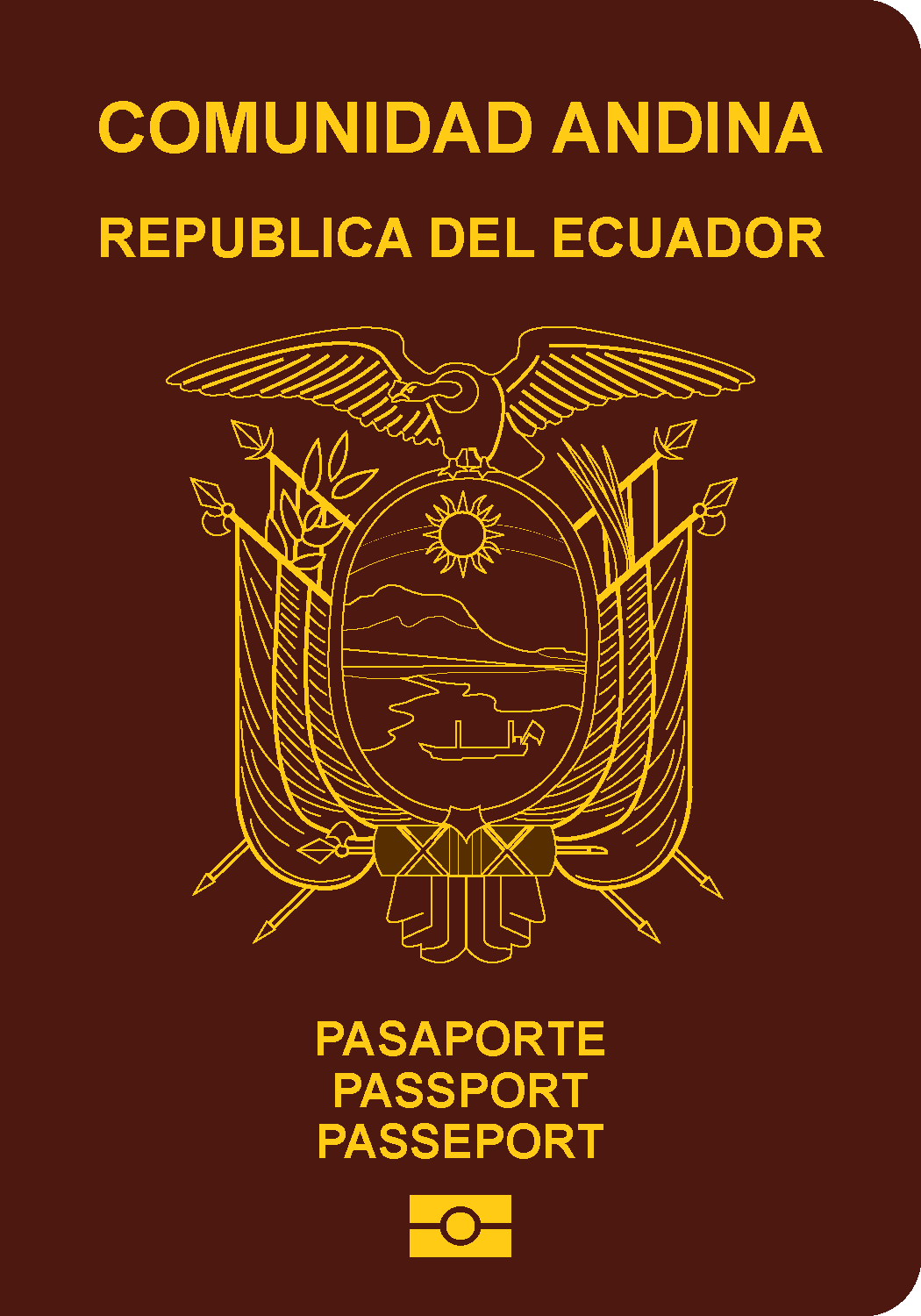
(Andean Community) Ecuador

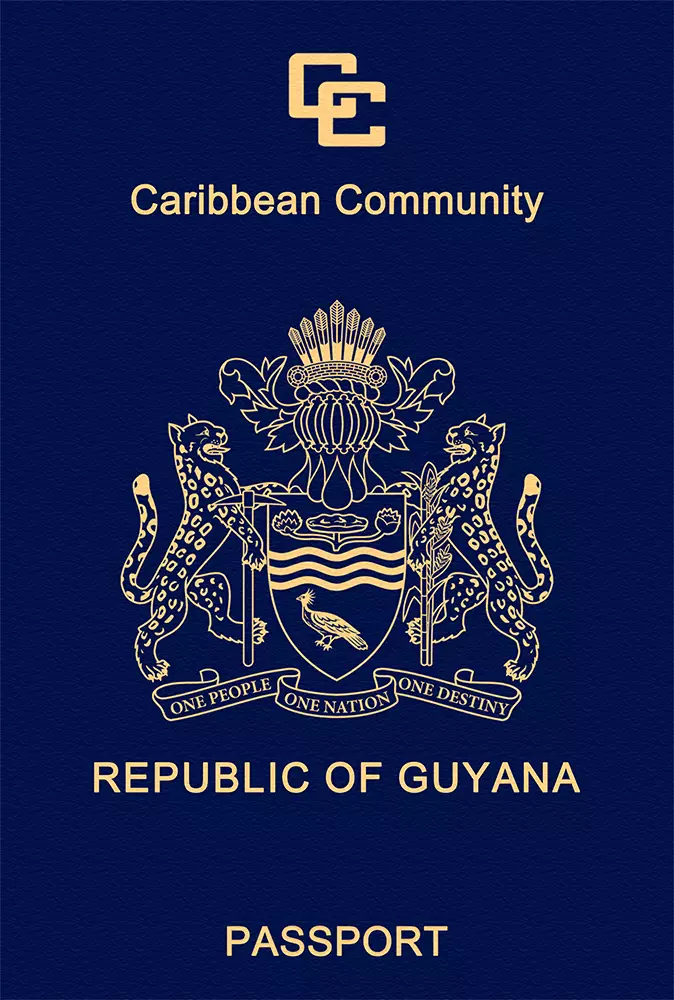
(Caribbean Community) Guyana

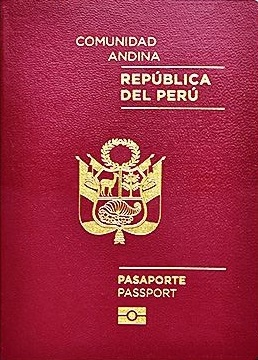
(Andean Community) Peru

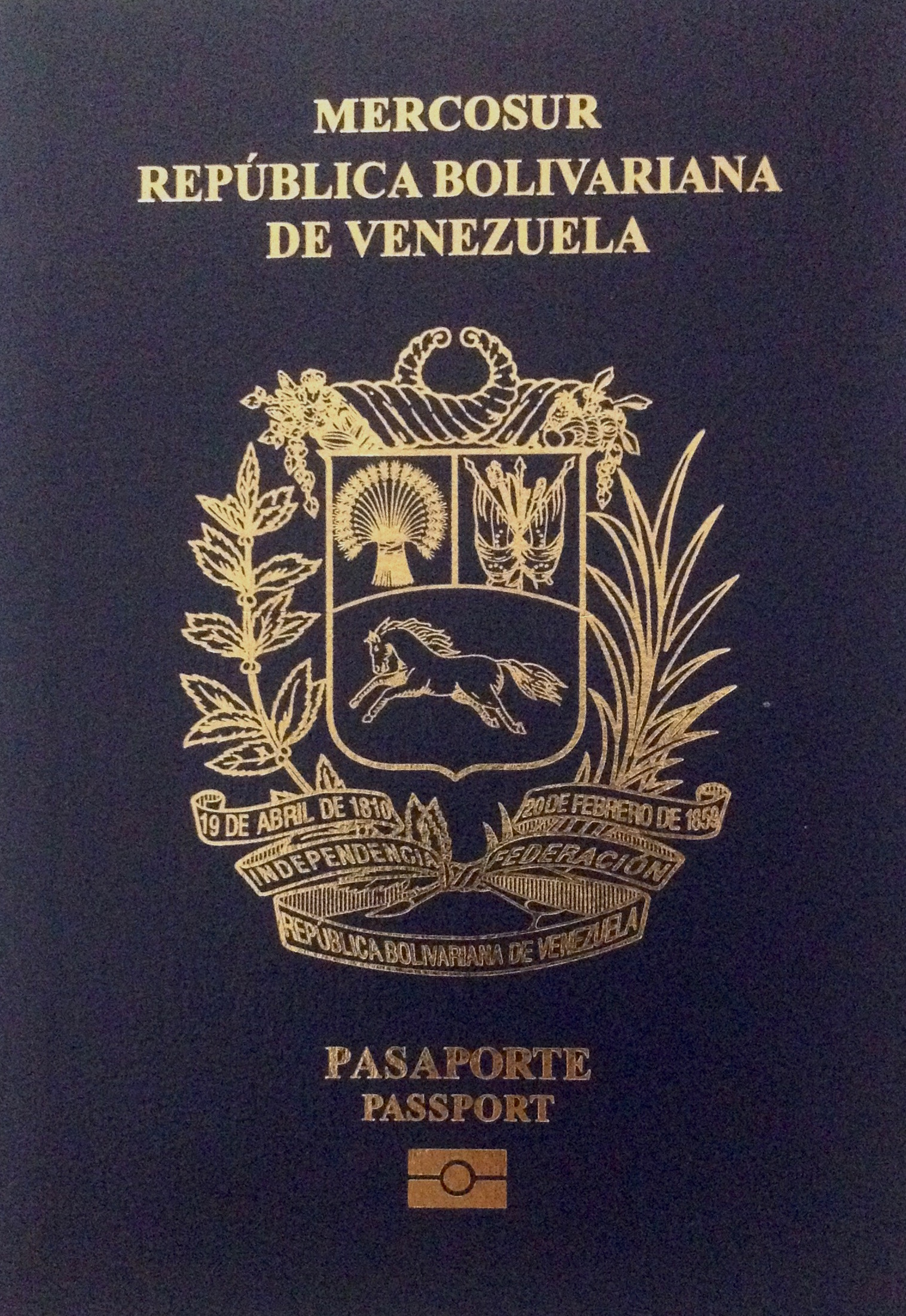
Venezuela

=== Asia ===

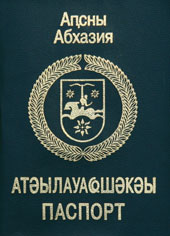
Abkhazia

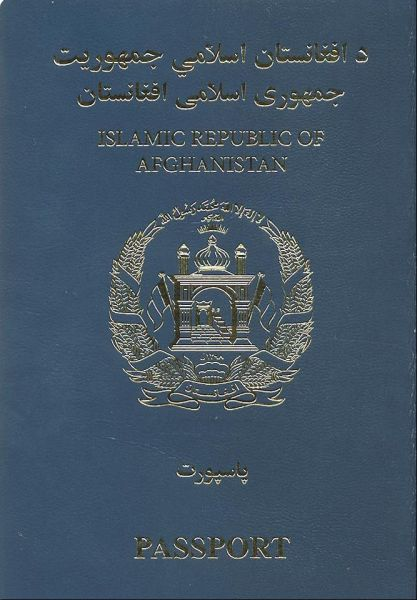
Afghanistan

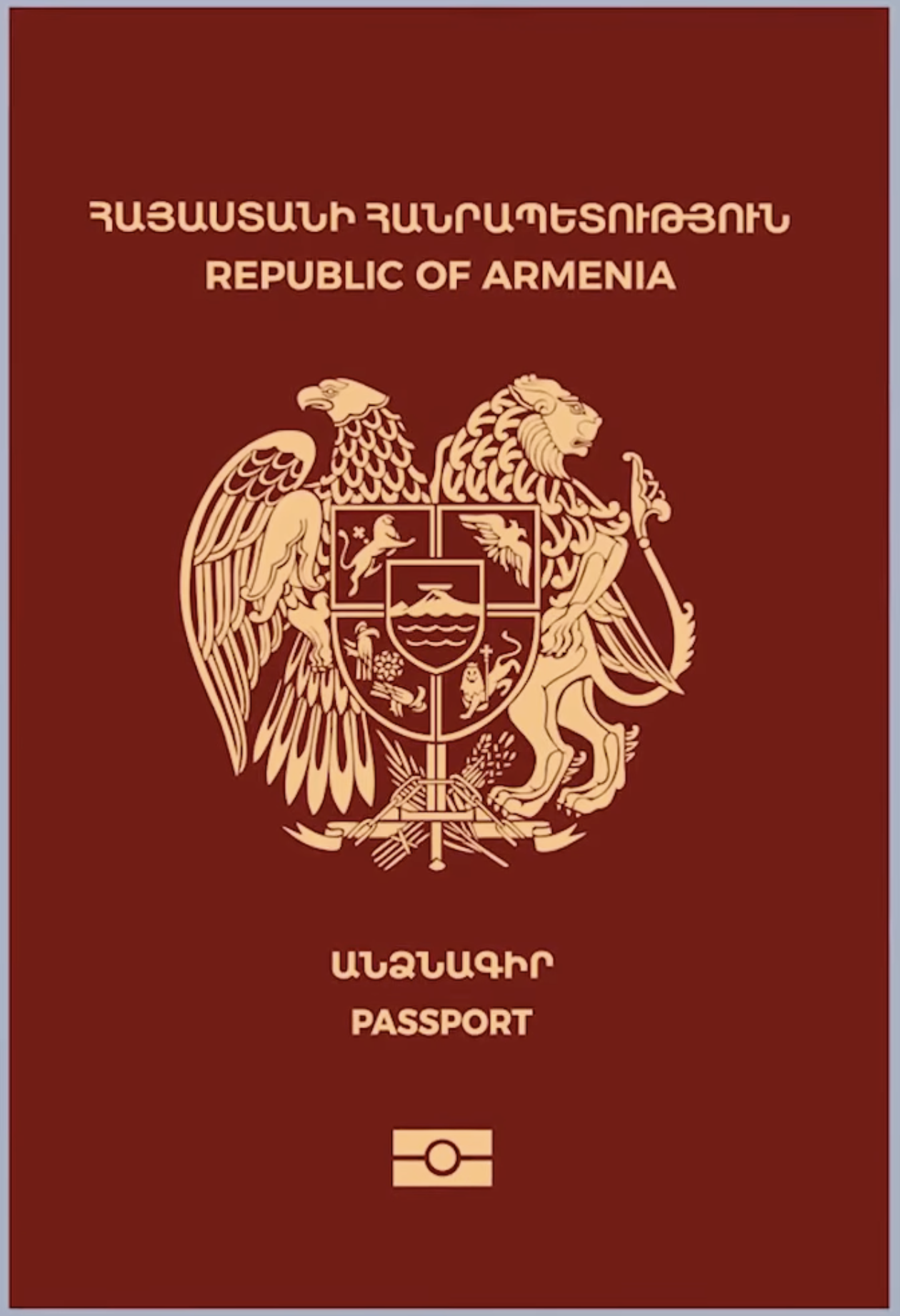
(Commonwealth of Independent States) (Eurasian Economic Union) Armenia

(Commonwealth of Independent States) Azerbaijan

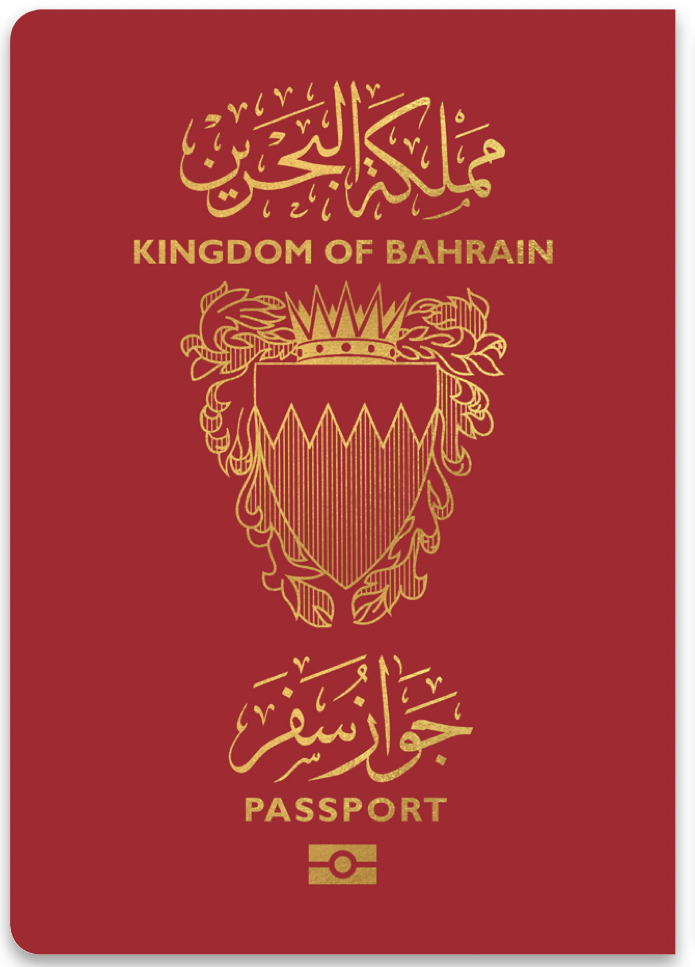
Bahrain

Bangladesh

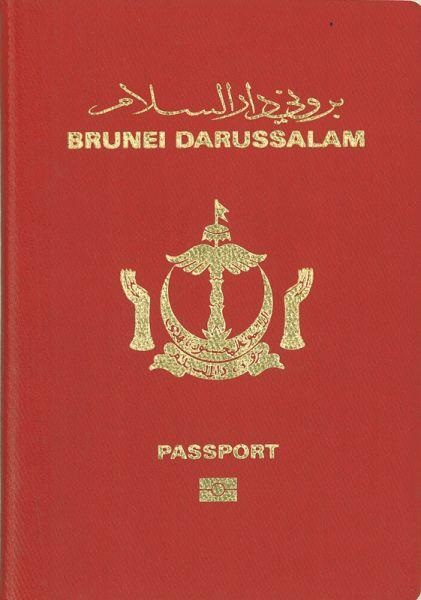
(ASEAN) Brunei

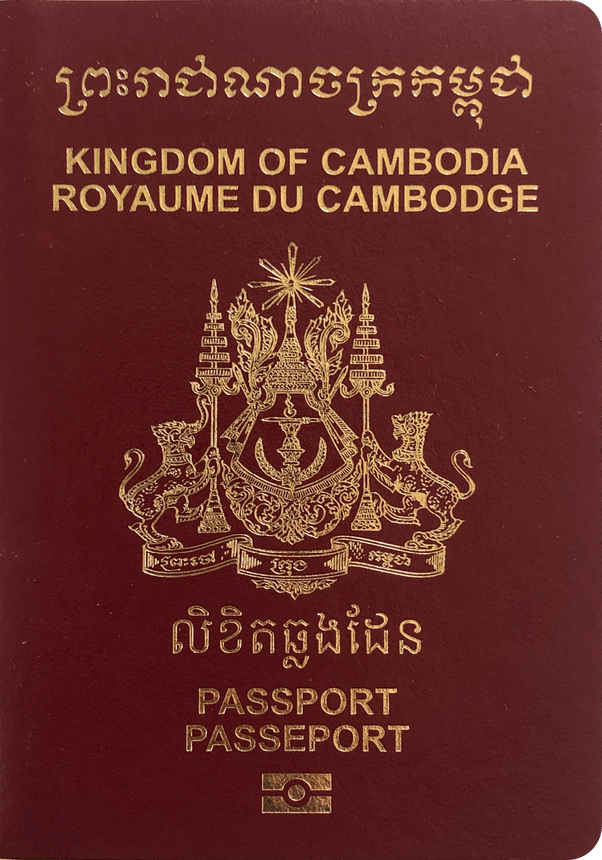
(ASEAN) Cambodia

China

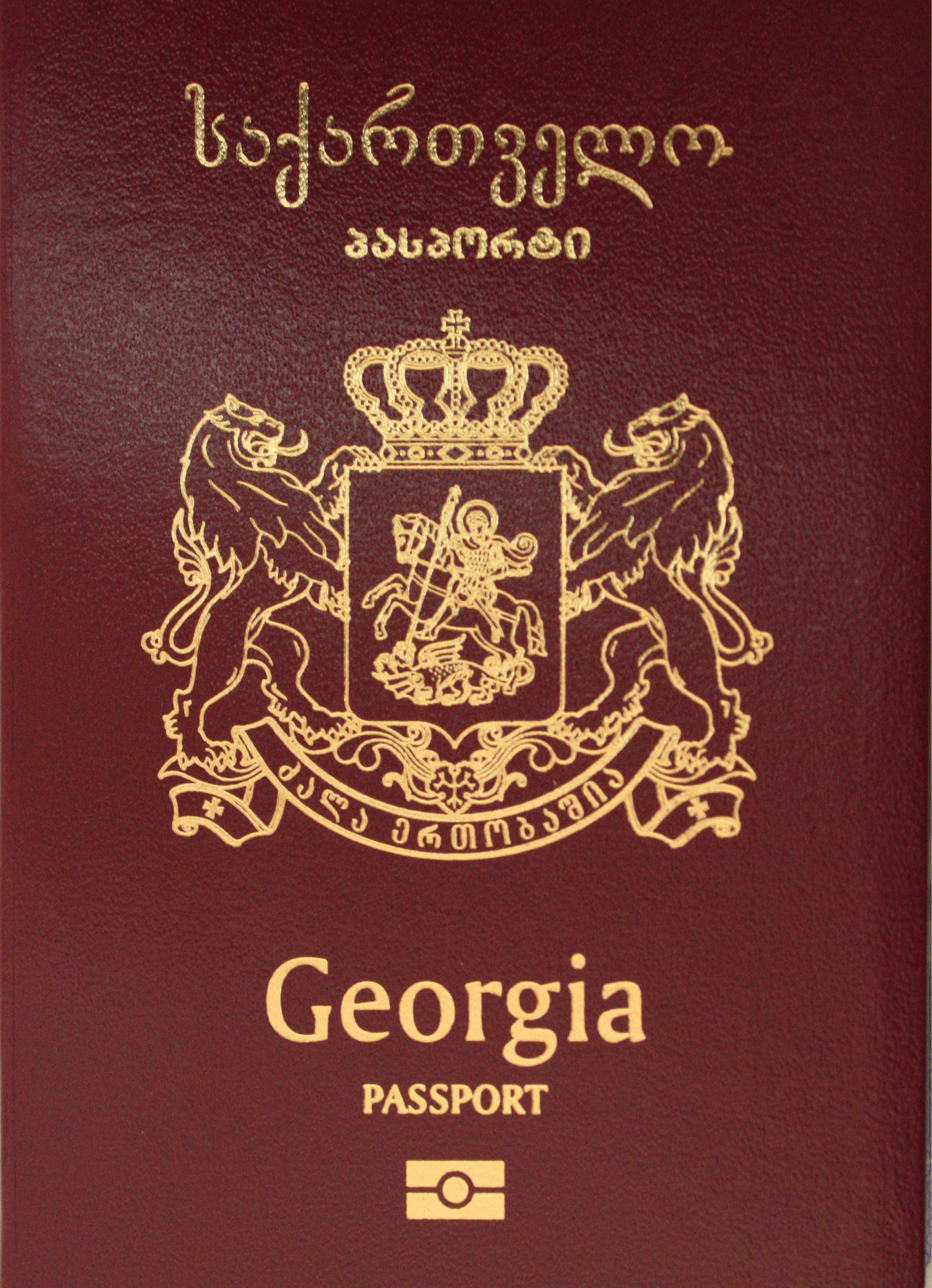
(Georgia (country)) Georgia

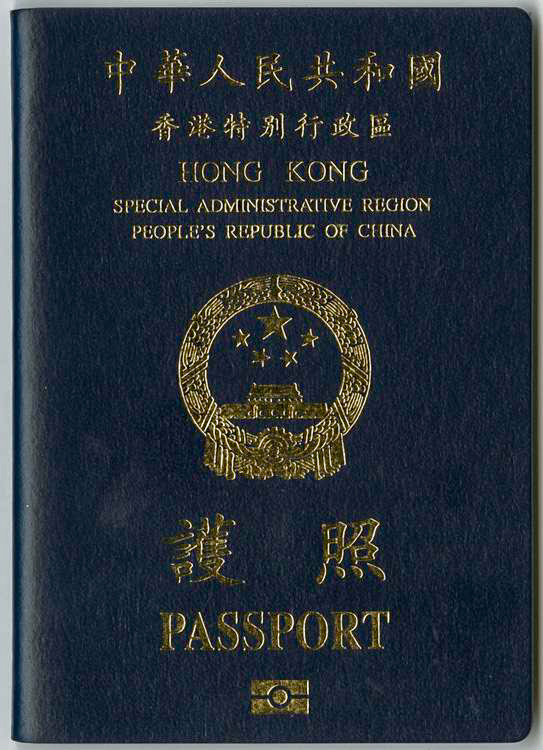
Hong Kong

India

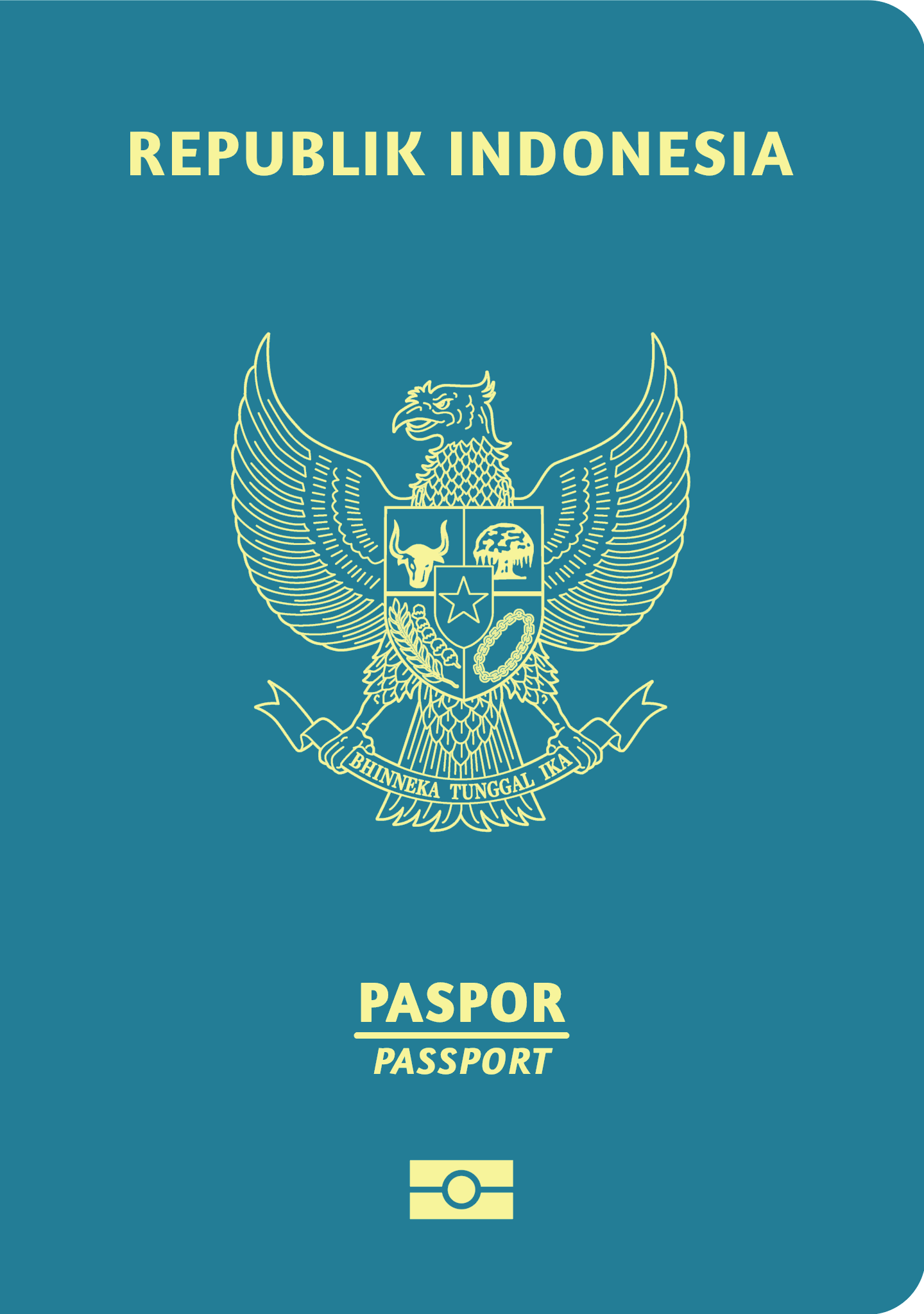
(ASEAN) Indonesia

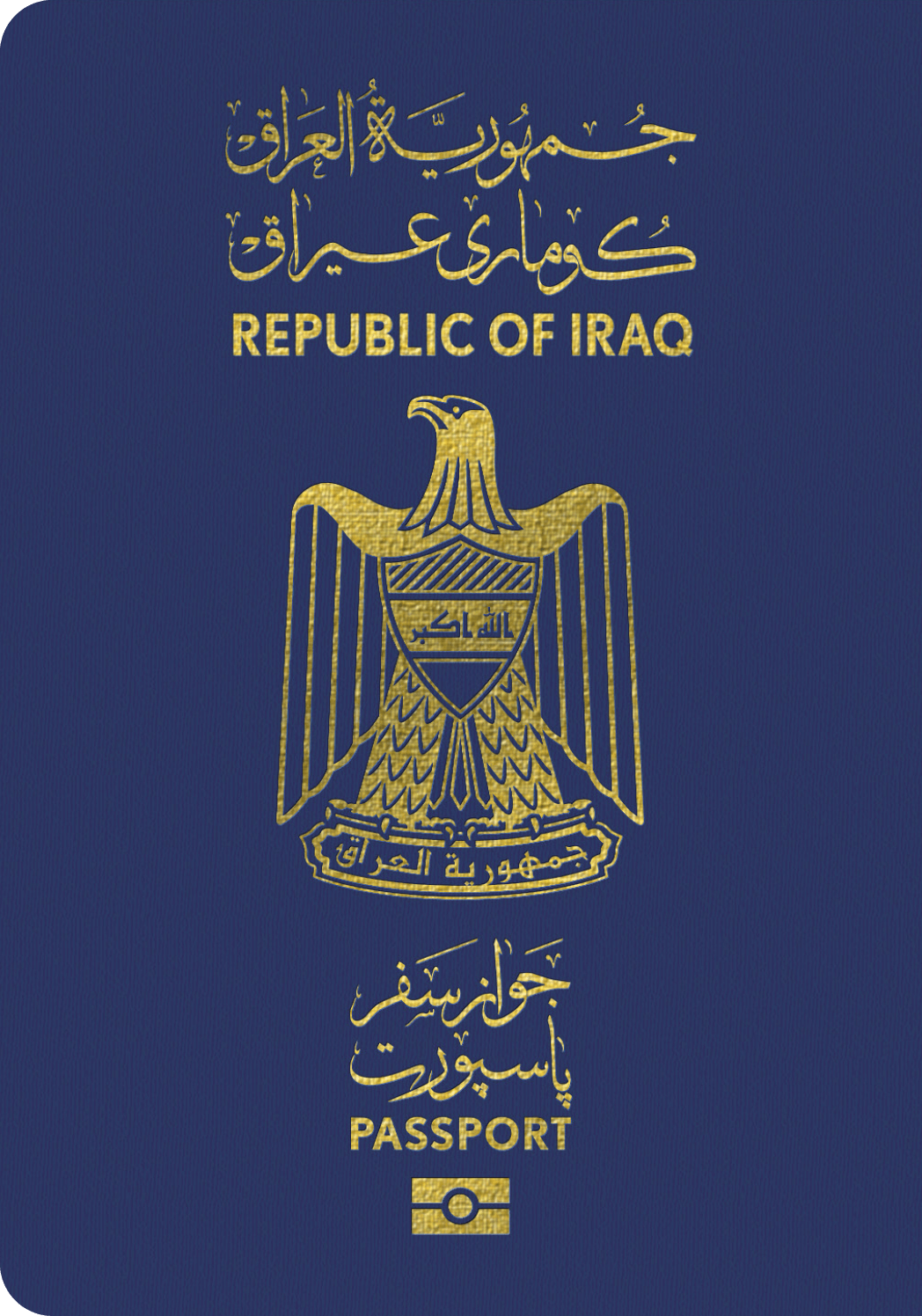
Iraq

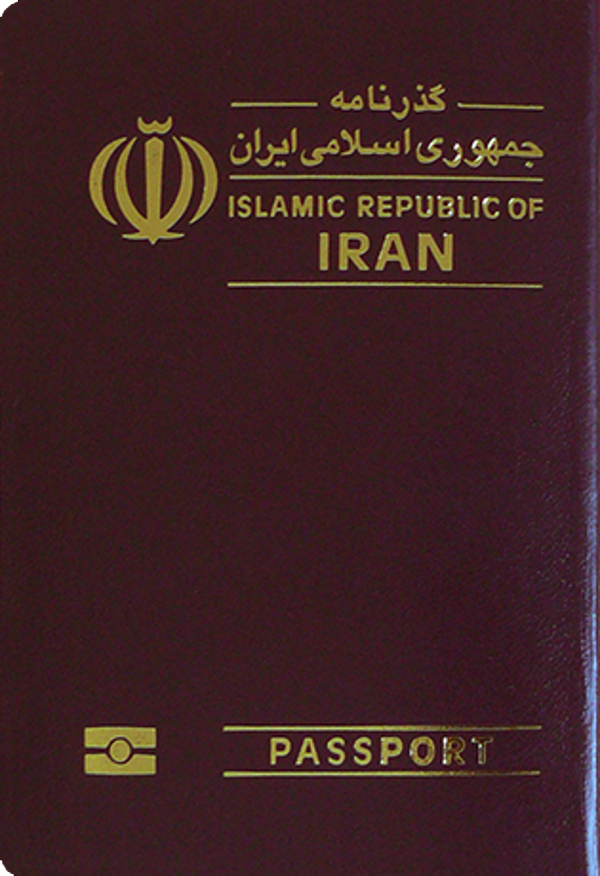
Iran

Israel

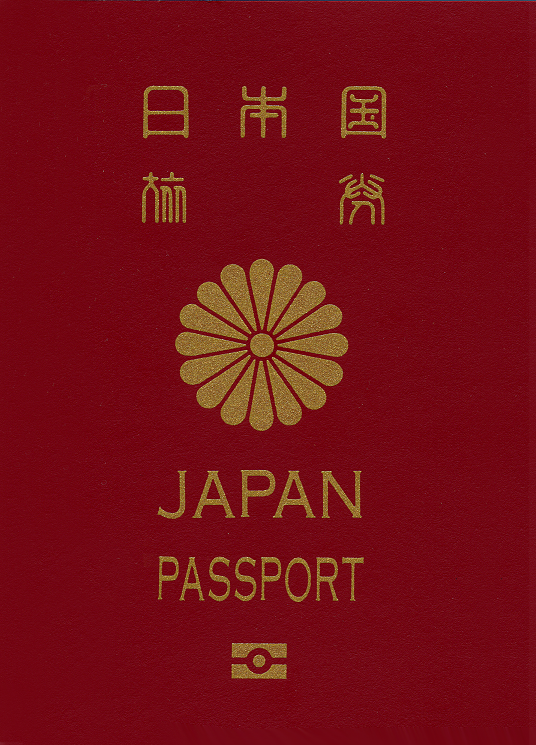
Japan

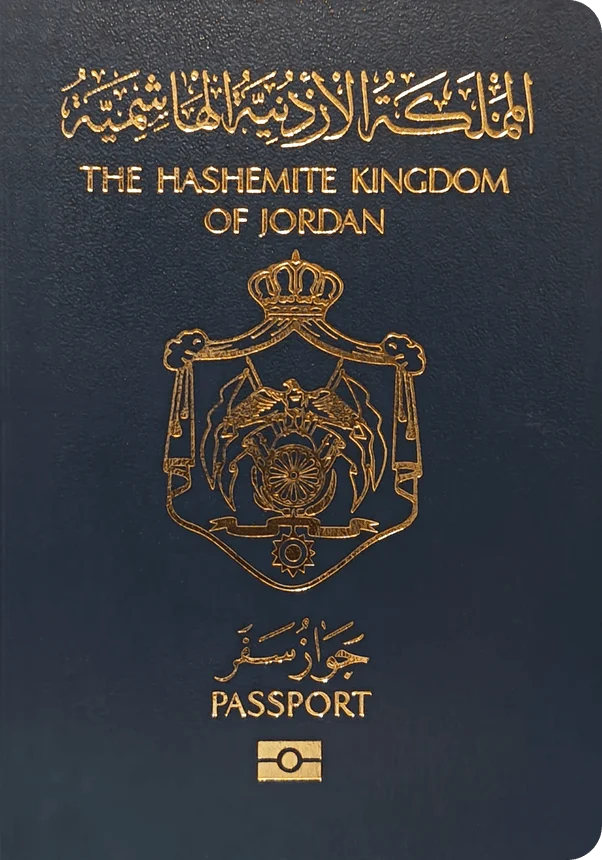
Jordan

(Commonwealth of Independent States) (Eurasian Economic Union) Kazakhstan

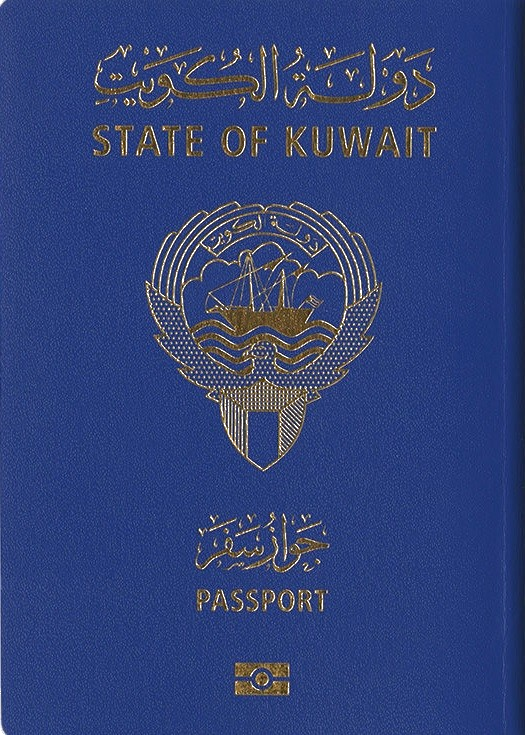
(Cooperation Council for the Arab States of the Gulf) Kuwait

(Commonwealth of Independent States) (Eurasian Economic Union) Kyrgyzstan

(ASEAN) Laos

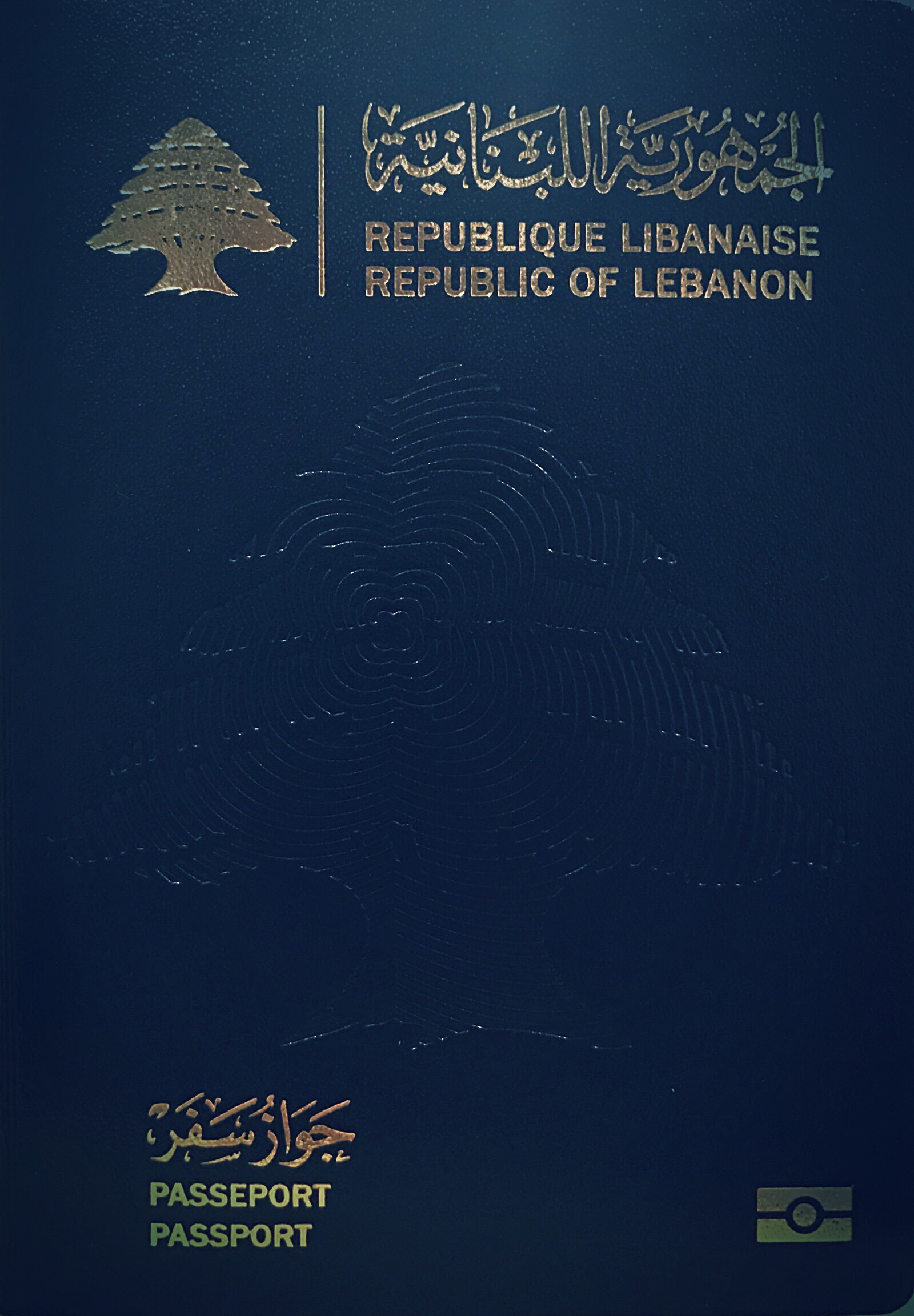
Lebanon

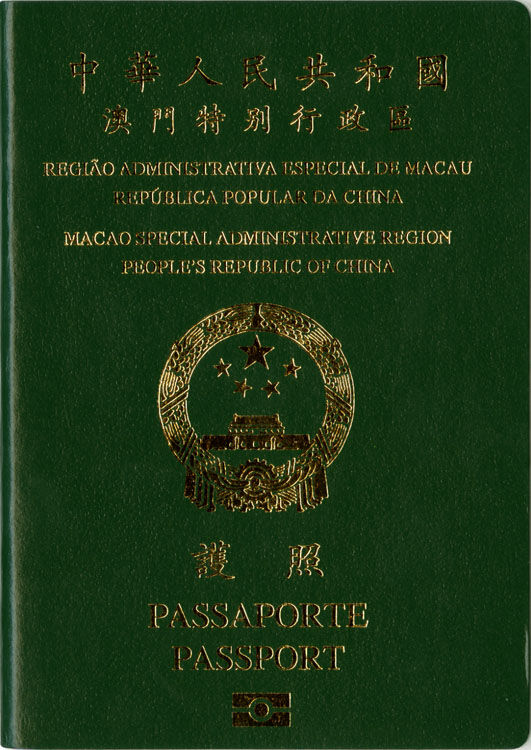
(Macau) Macao

(ASEAN) Malaysia

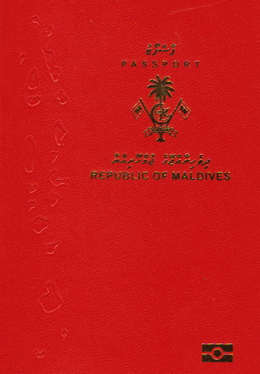
Maldives

Mongolia

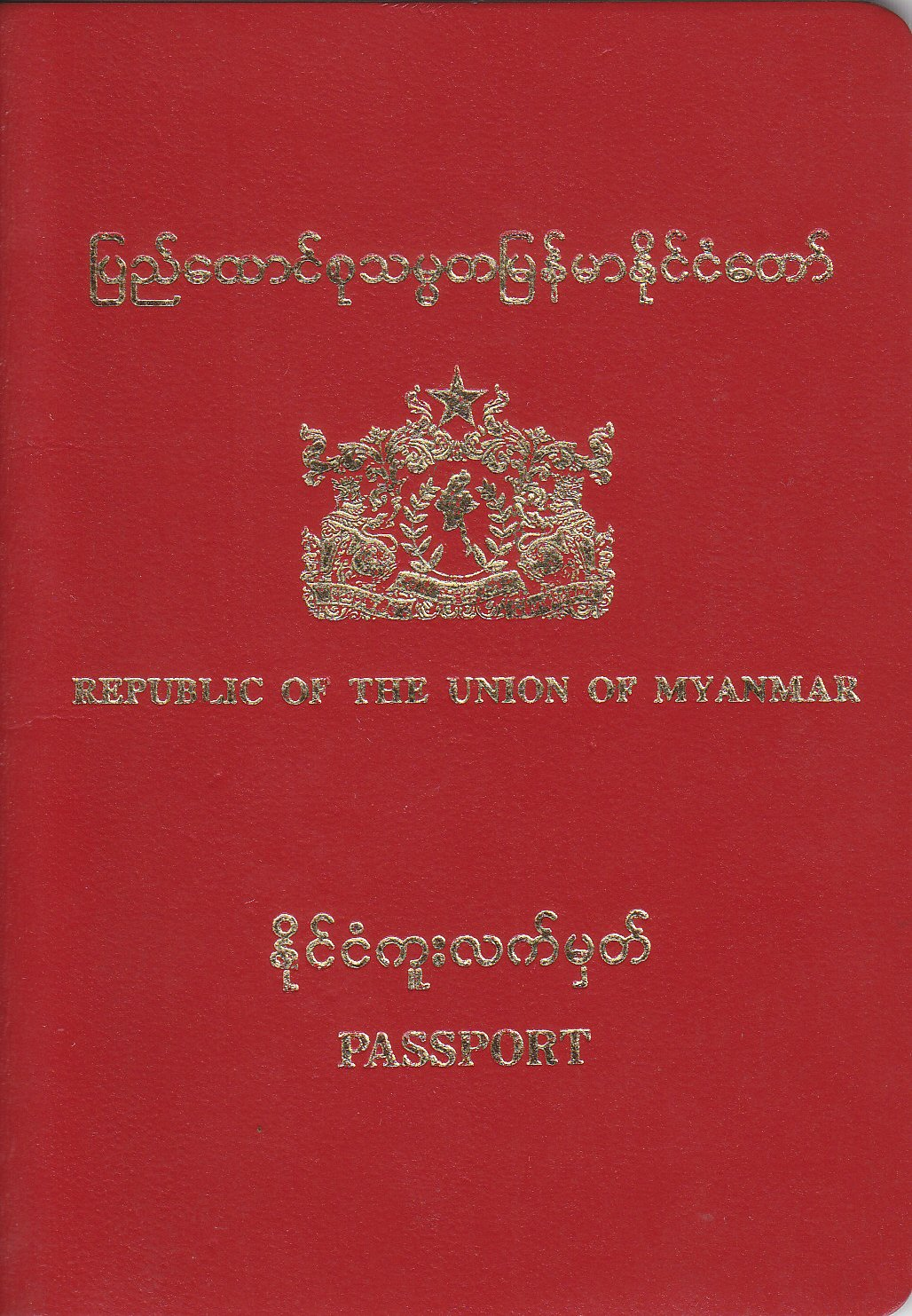
(ASEAN) Myanmar

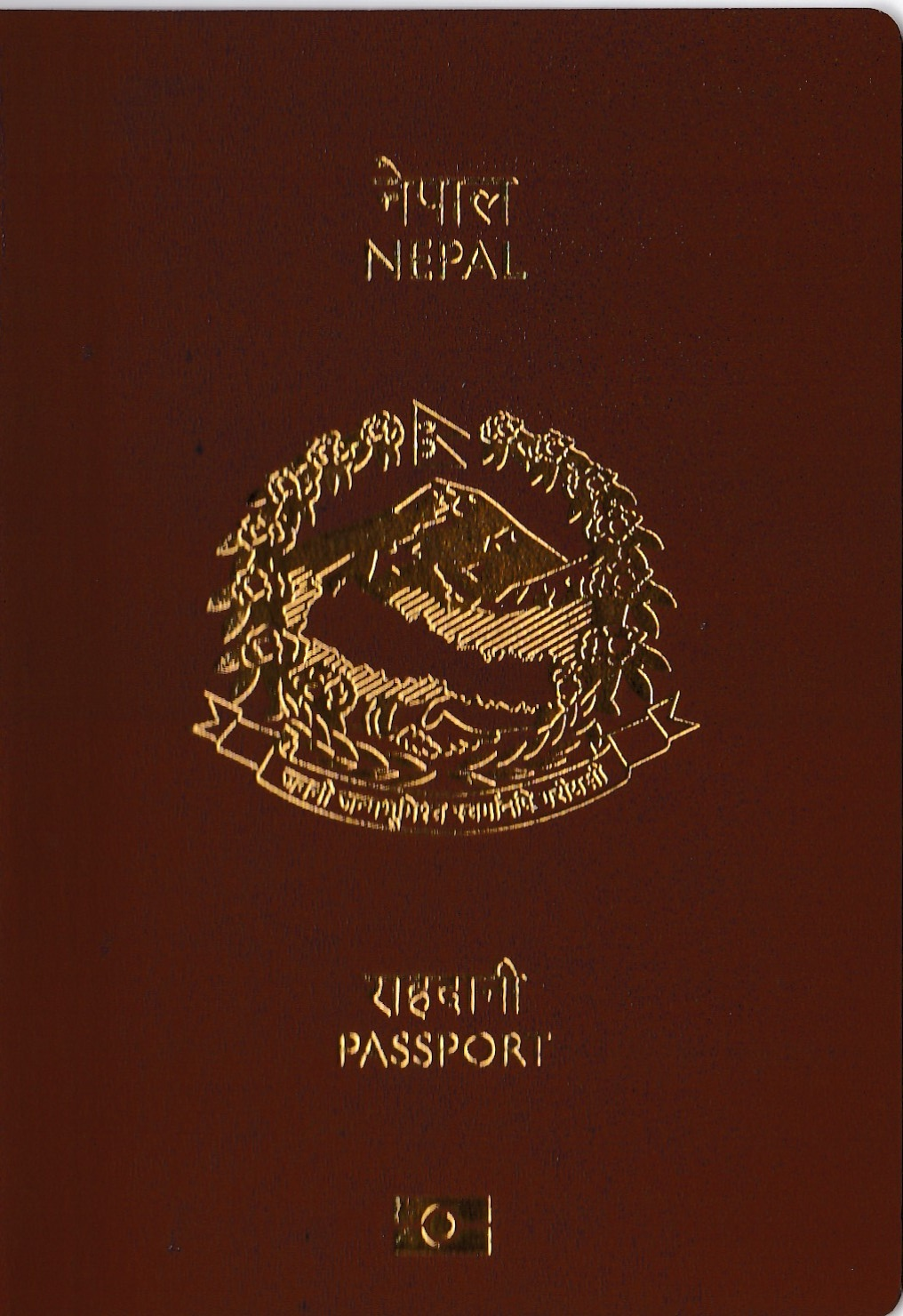
Nepal

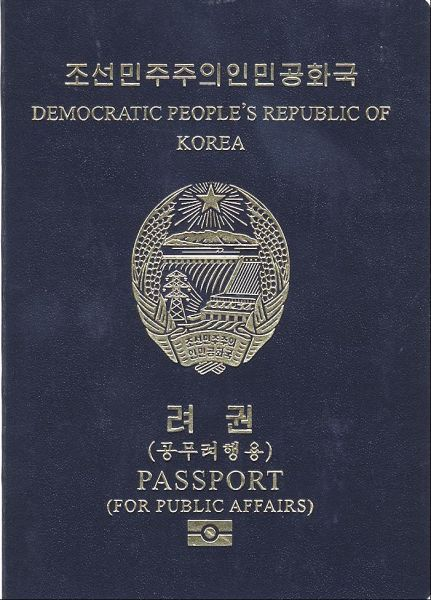
North Korea

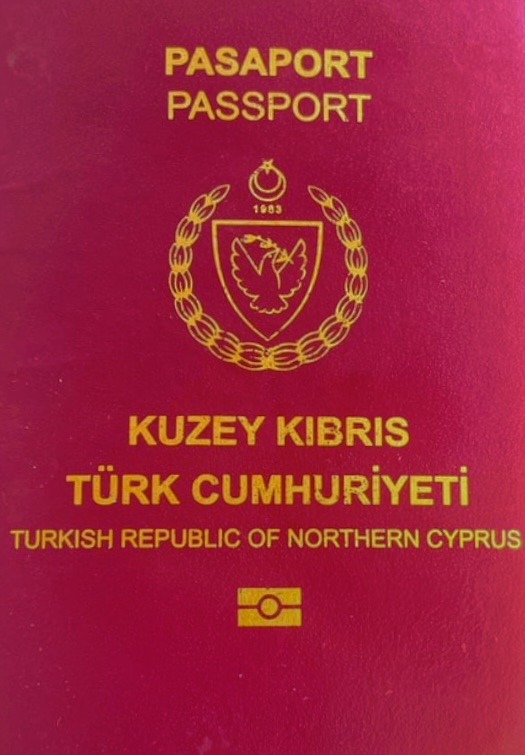
Northern Cyprus

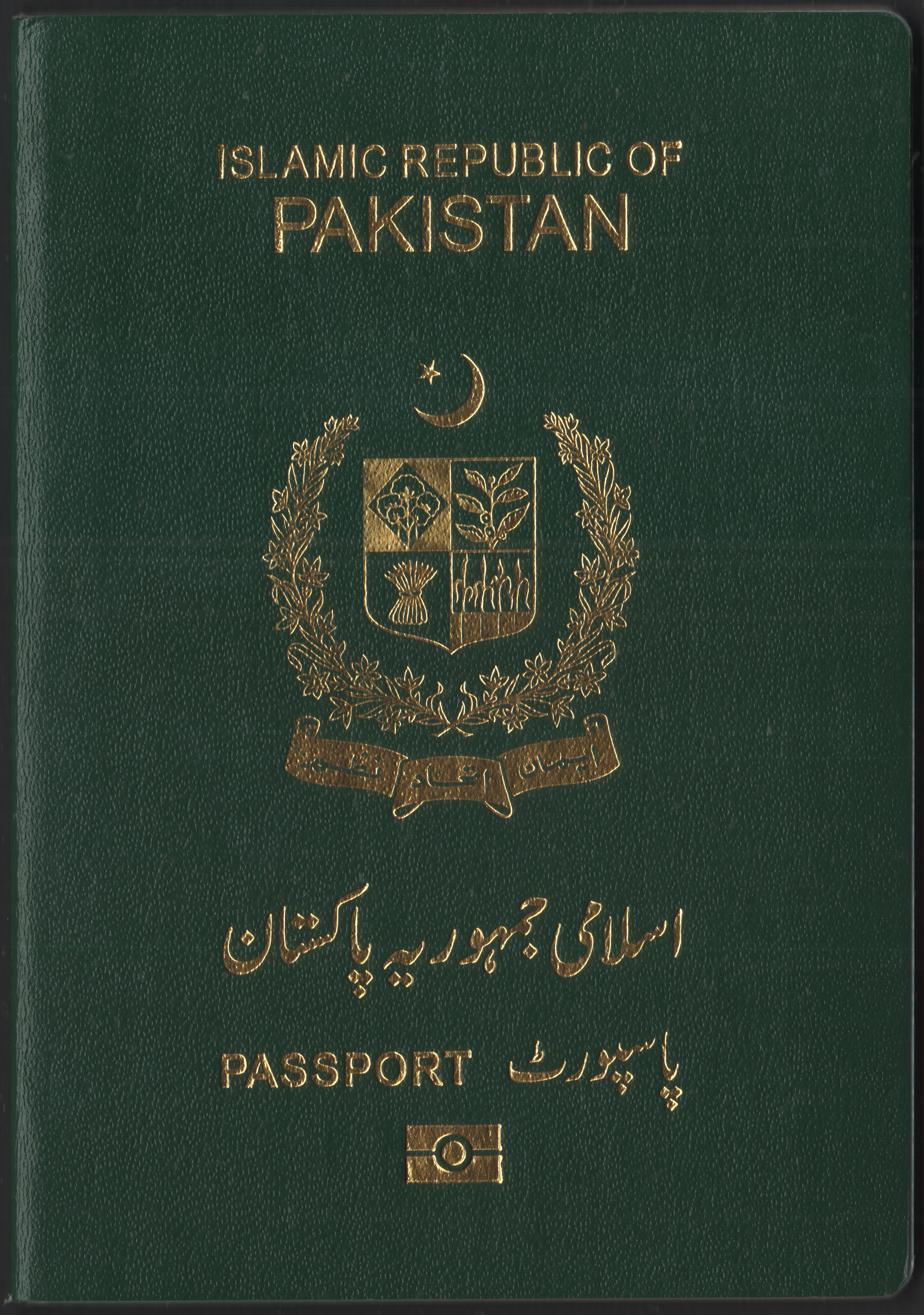
Pakistan

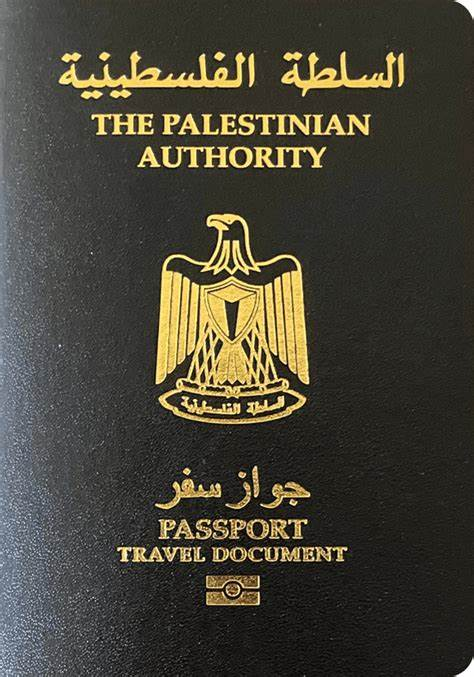
Palestine

(ASEAN) Philippines

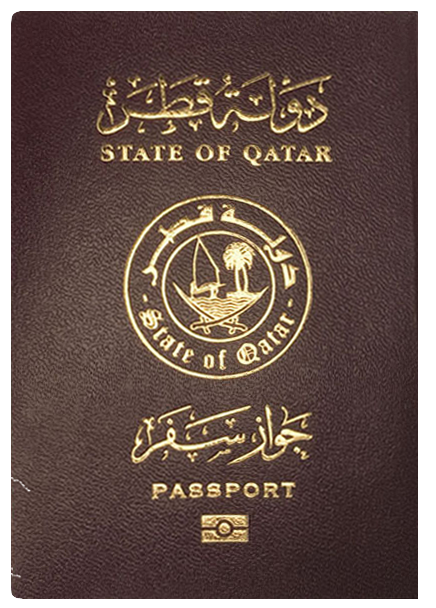
(Cooperation Council for the Arab States of the Gulf) Qatar

(Cooperation Council for the Arab States of the Gulf) Saudi Arabia

(ASEAN) Singapore

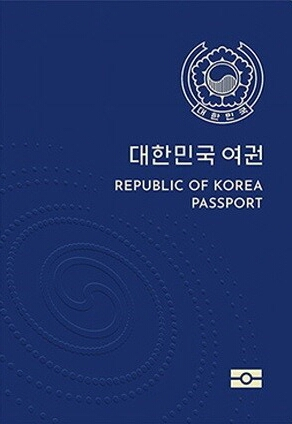
South Korea

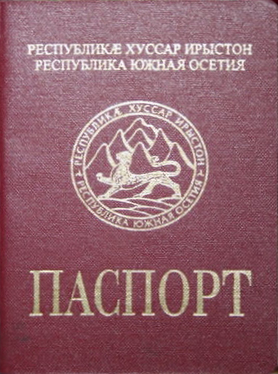
South Ossetia

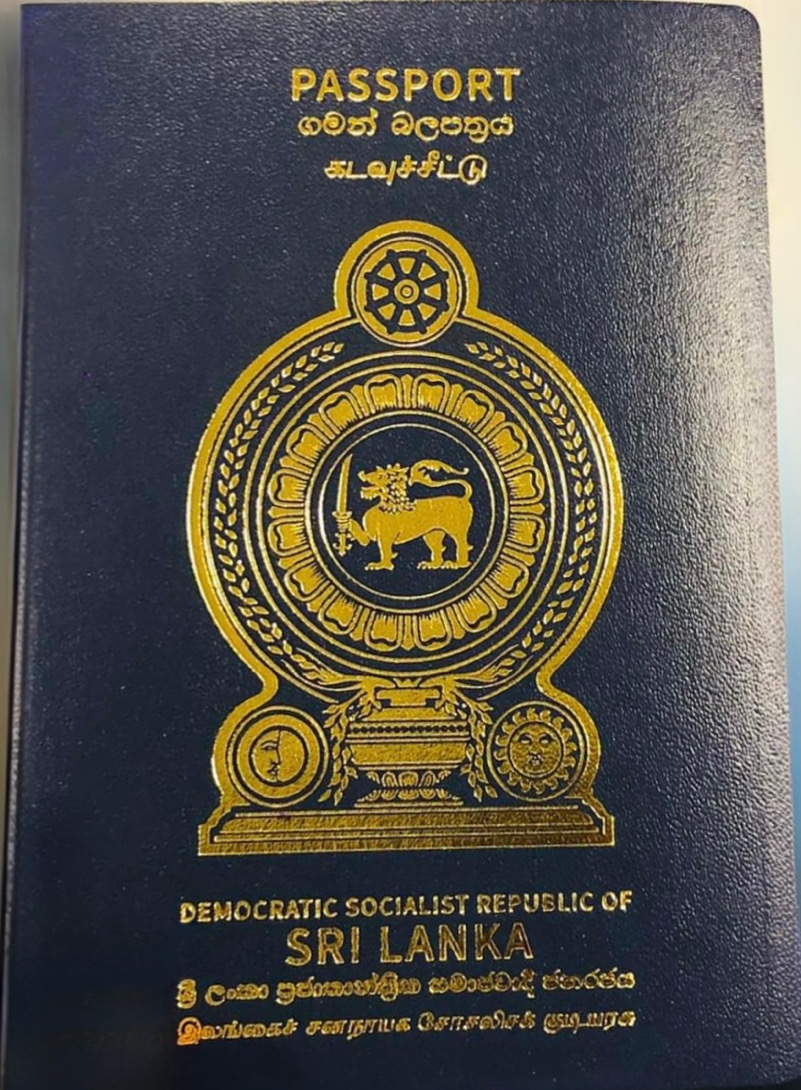
Sri Lanka

Syria

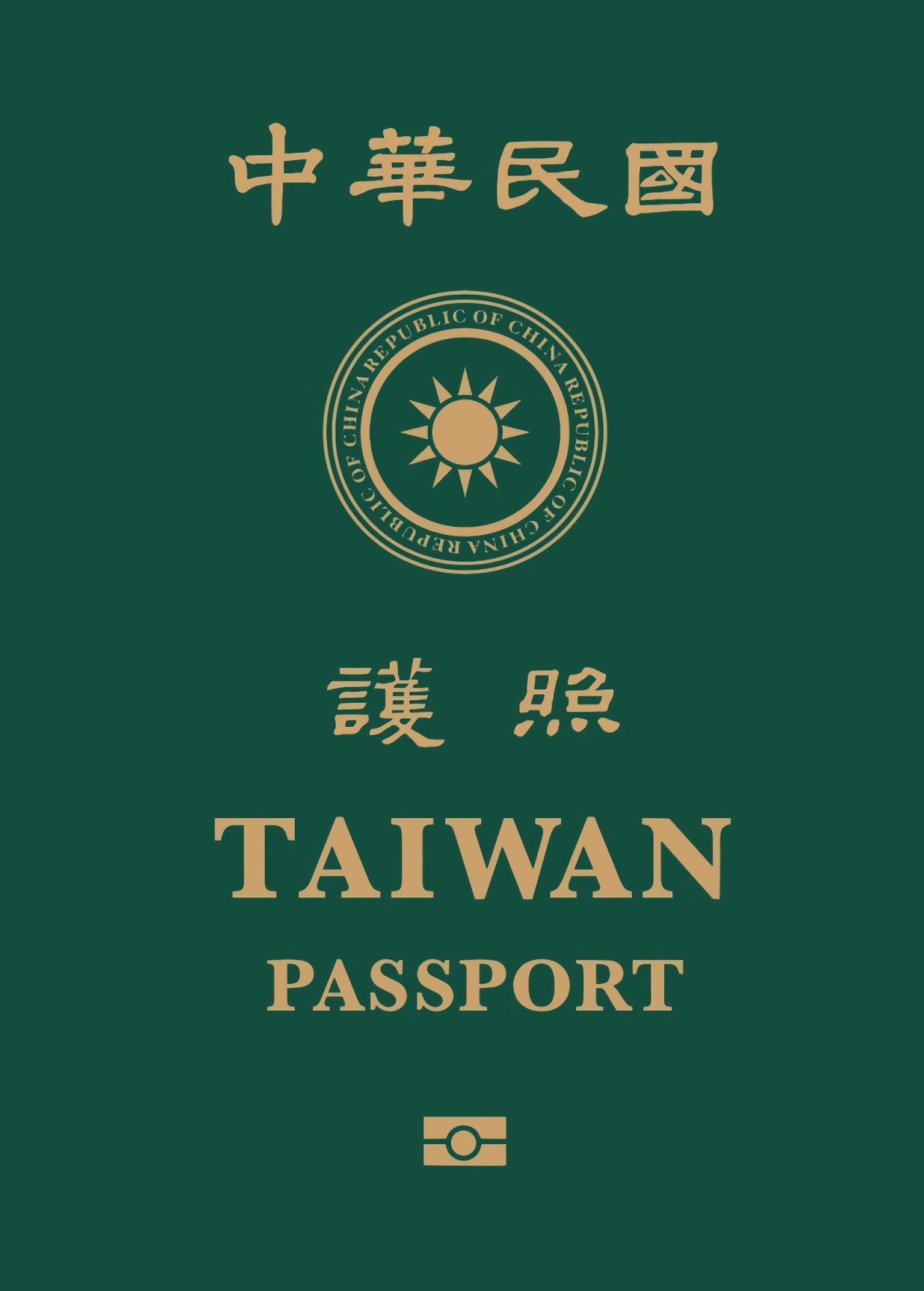
Republic of China (Taiwan)

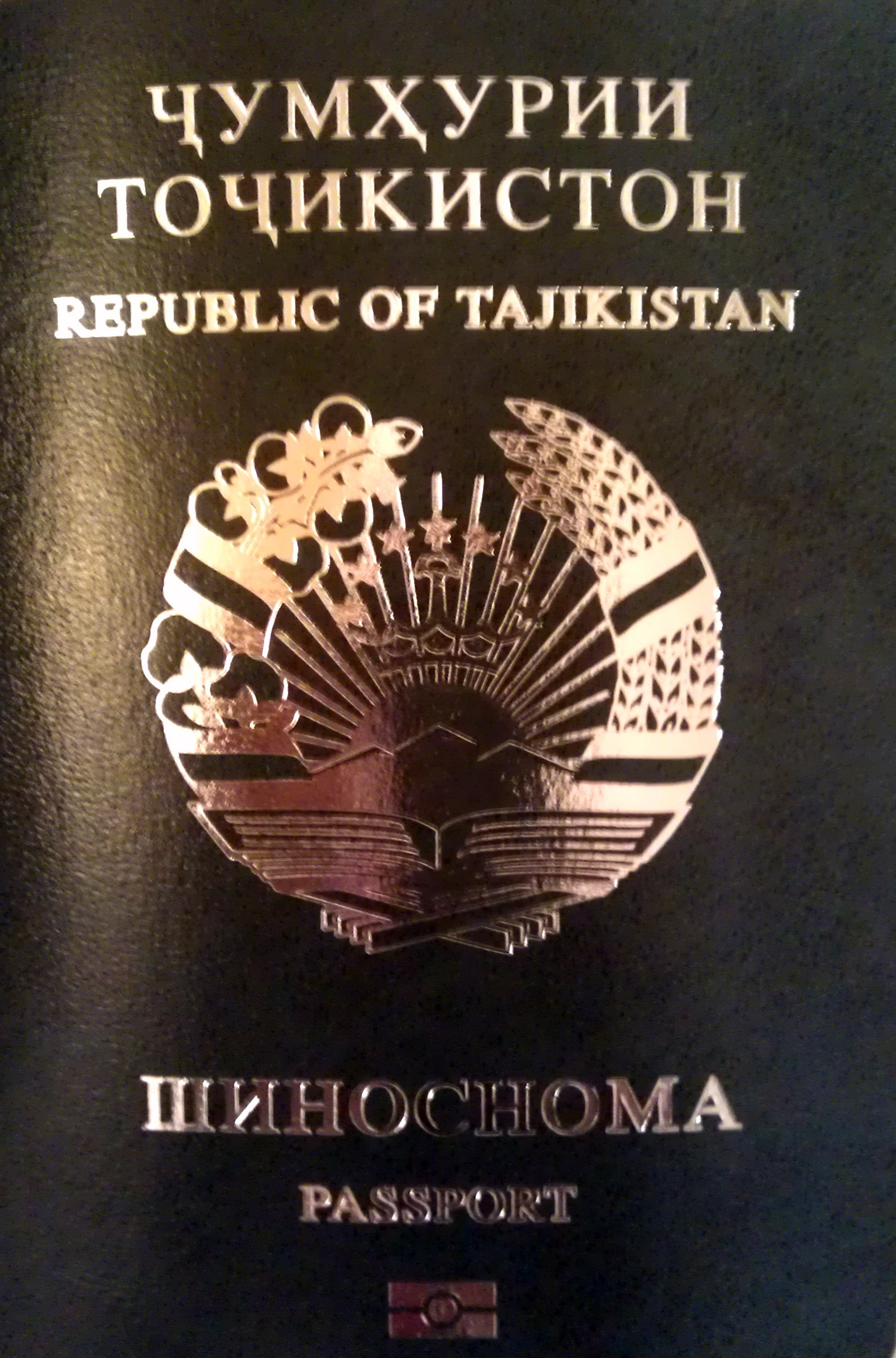
(Commonwealth of Independent States) Tajikistan

(ASEAN) Thailand

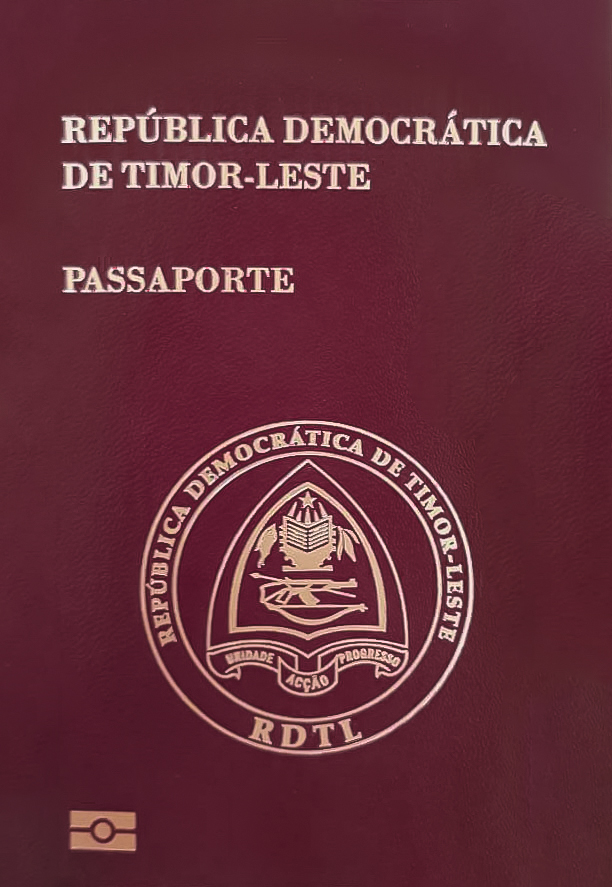
(ASEAN) Timor-Leste

Turkmenistan

(Cooperation Council for the Arab States of the Gulf) United Arab Emirates

(Commonwealth of Independent States) Uzbekistan

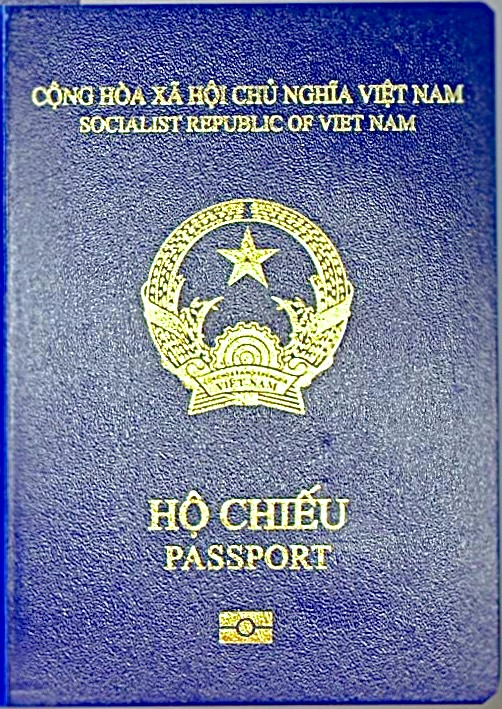
(ASEAN) Vietnam

Yemen

=== Europe ===

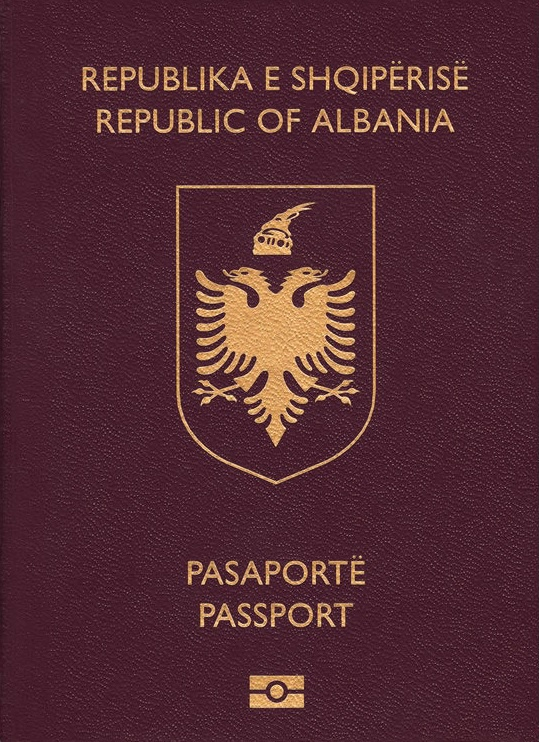
Albania

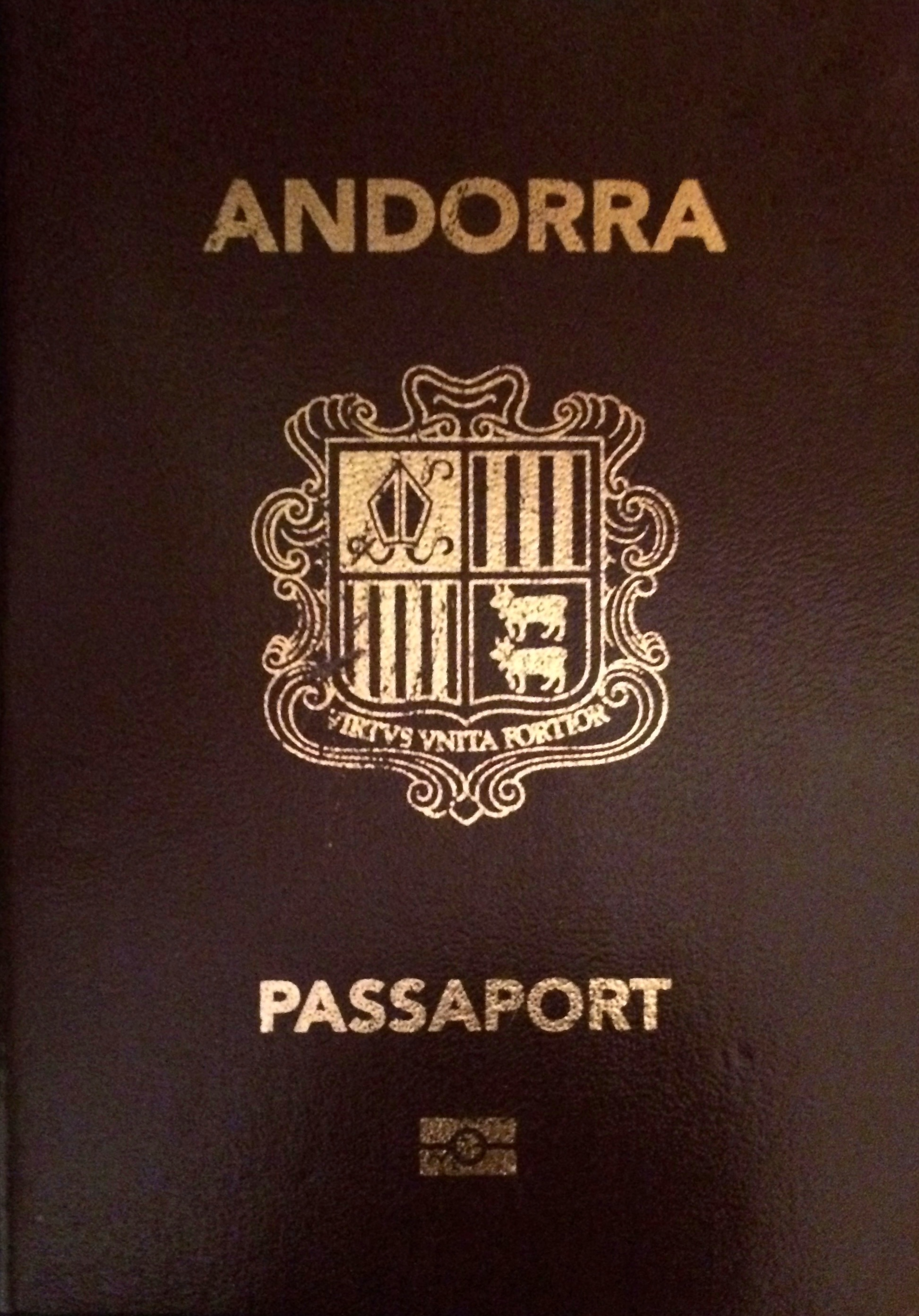
Andorra

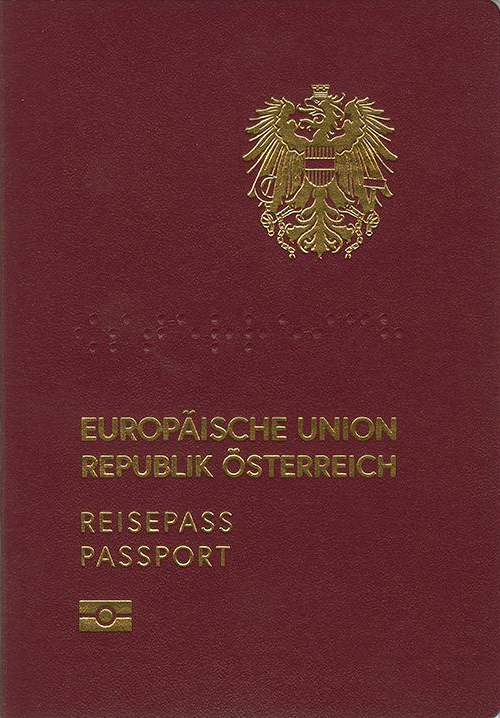
(European Union) Austria

(Commonwealth of Independent States) (Eurasian Economic Union) Belarus

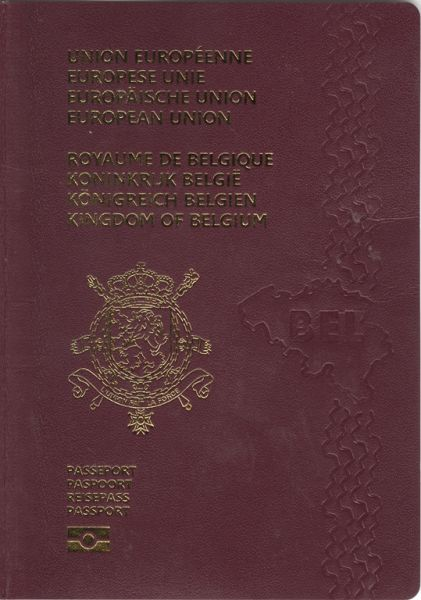
(European Union) Belgium

Bosnia and Herzegovina

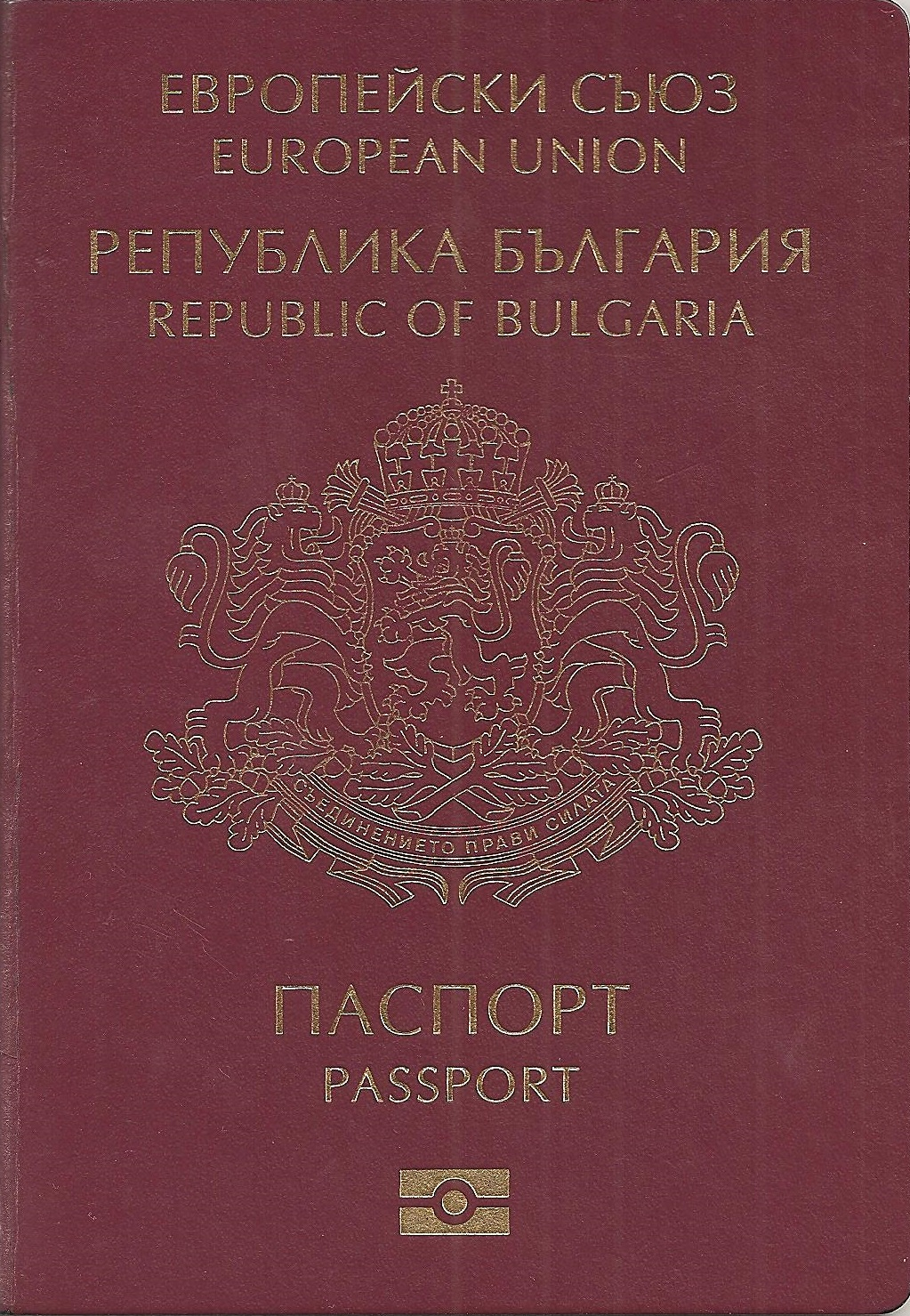
(European Union) Bulgaria

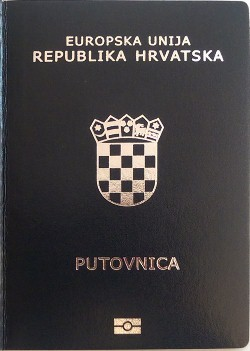
(European Union) Croatia

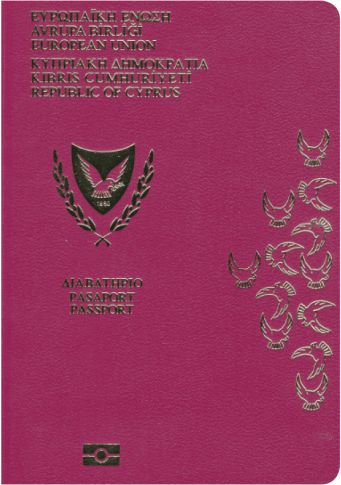
(European Union) Cyprus

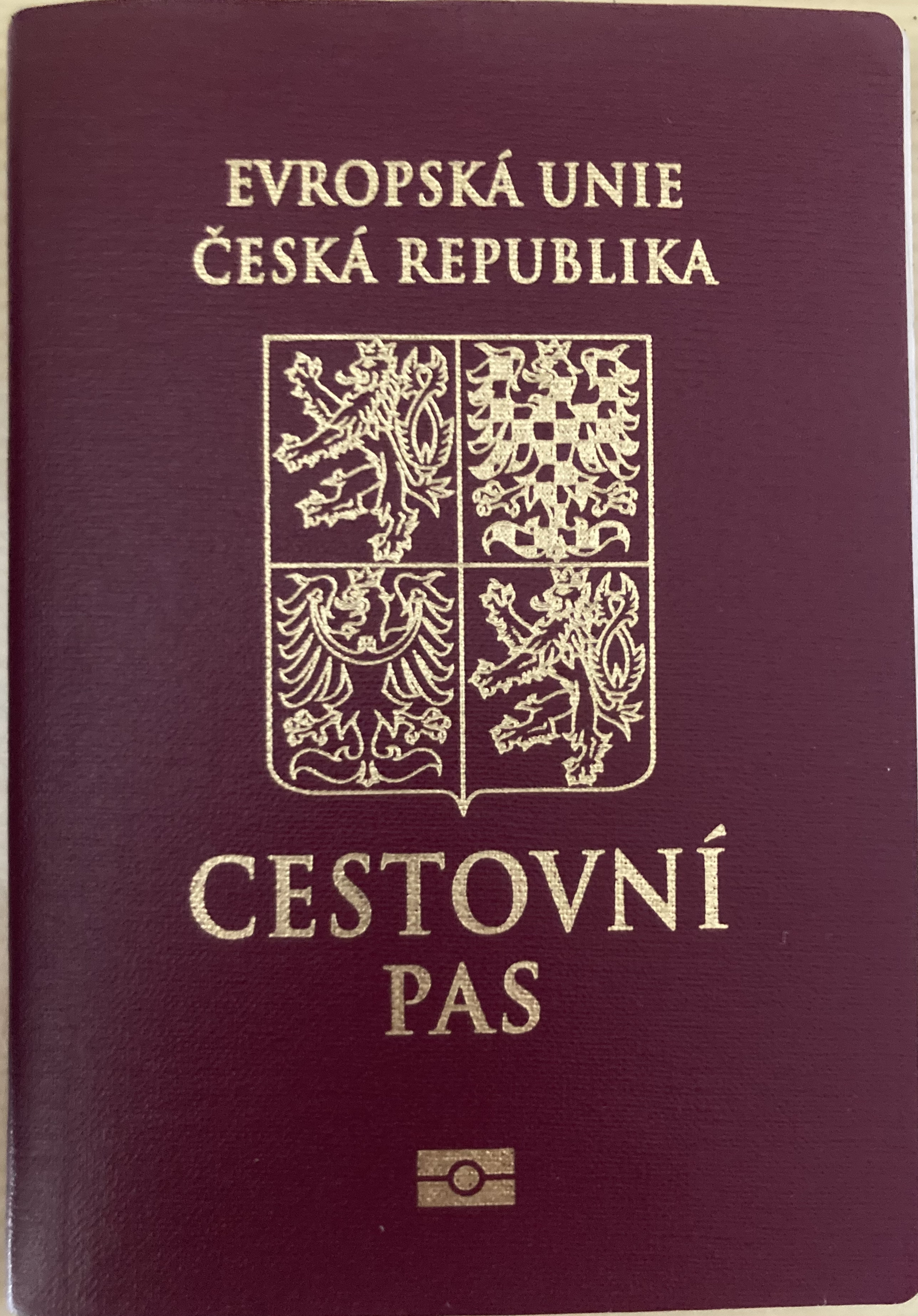
(European Union) (Czech Republic) Czechia

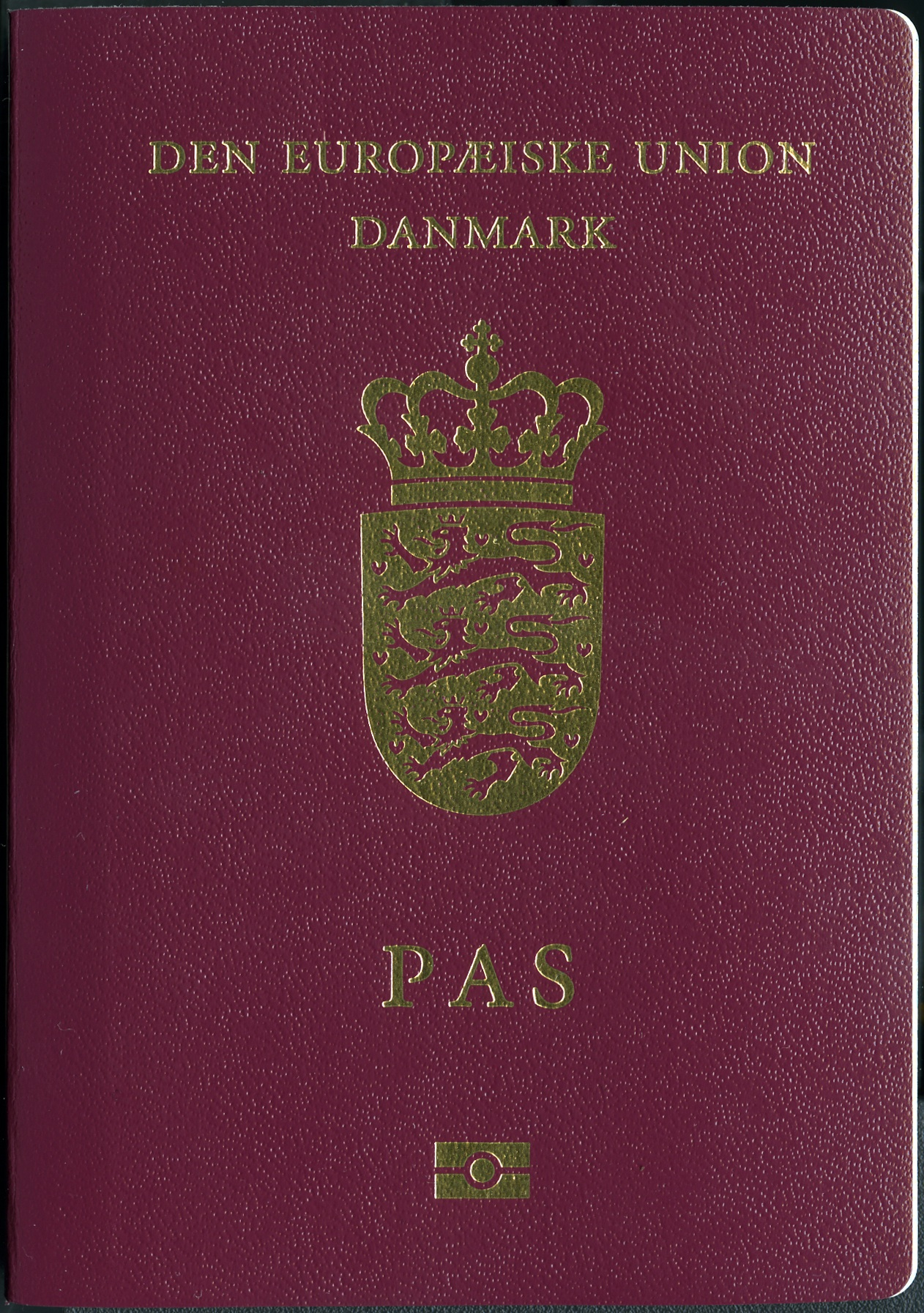
(European Union) Denmark

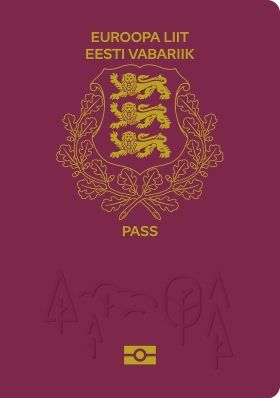
(European Union) Estonia

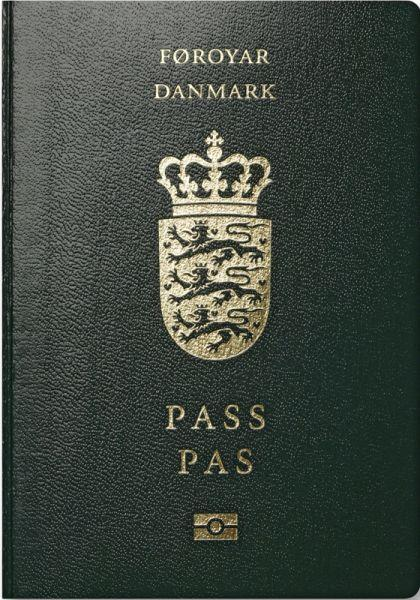
(Danish Realm) Faroe Islands

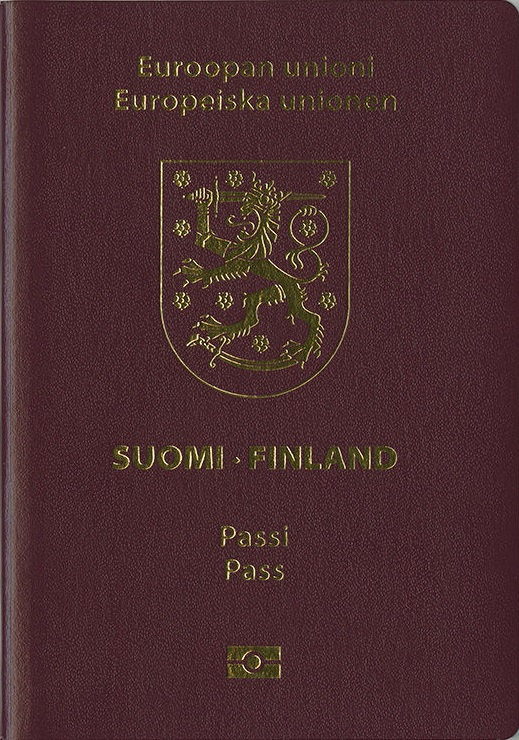
(European Union) Finland

(European Union) France

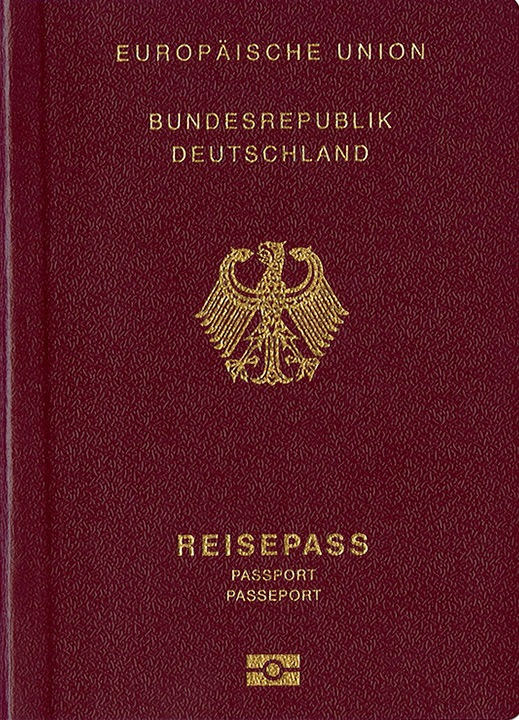
(European Union) Germany

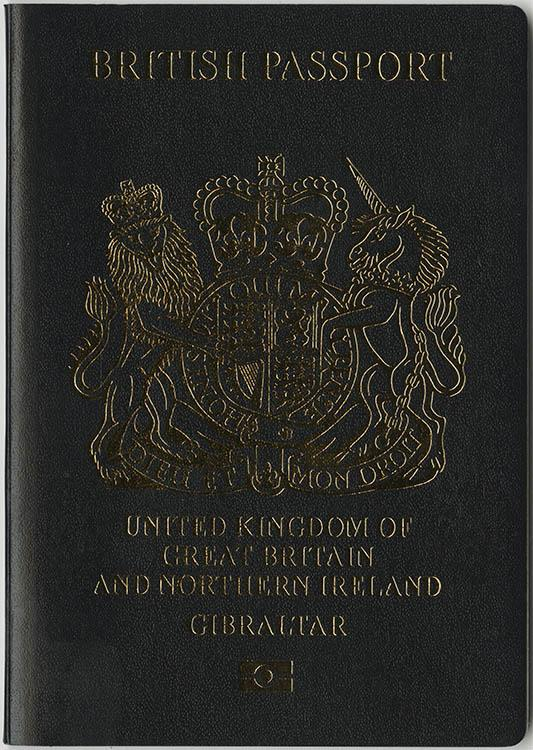
(United Kingdom) Gibraltar

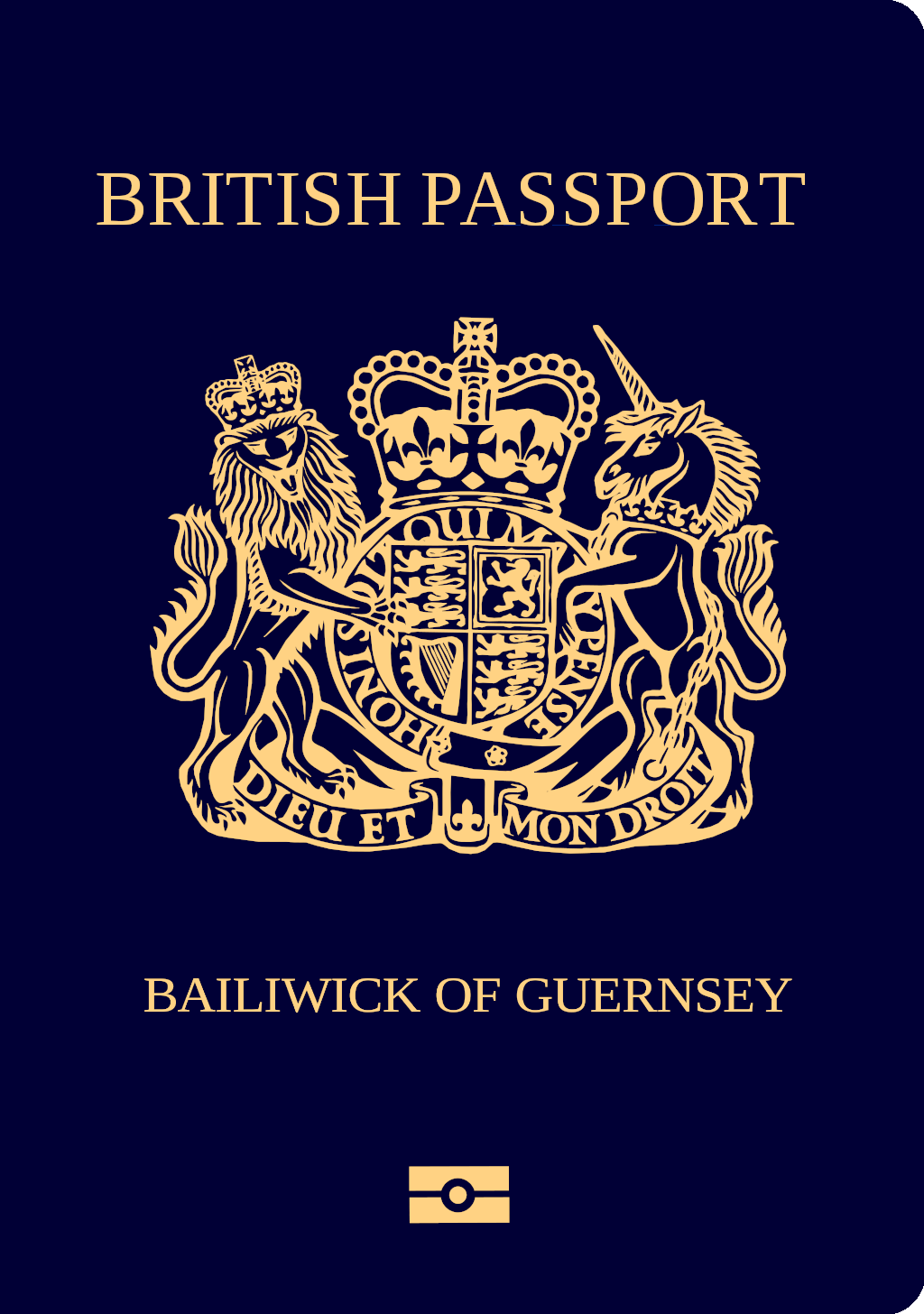
(United Kingdom) (Bailiwick of Guernsey) Guernsey

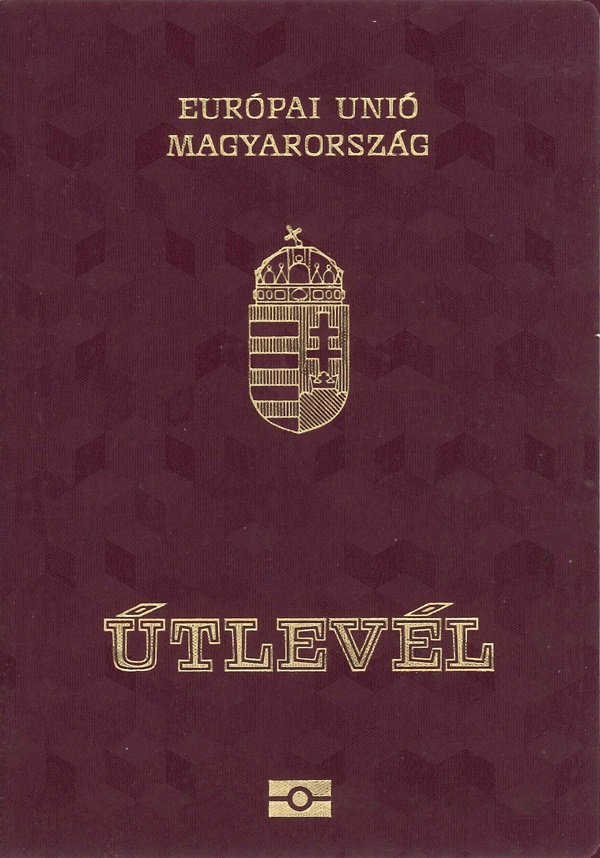
(European Union) Hungary

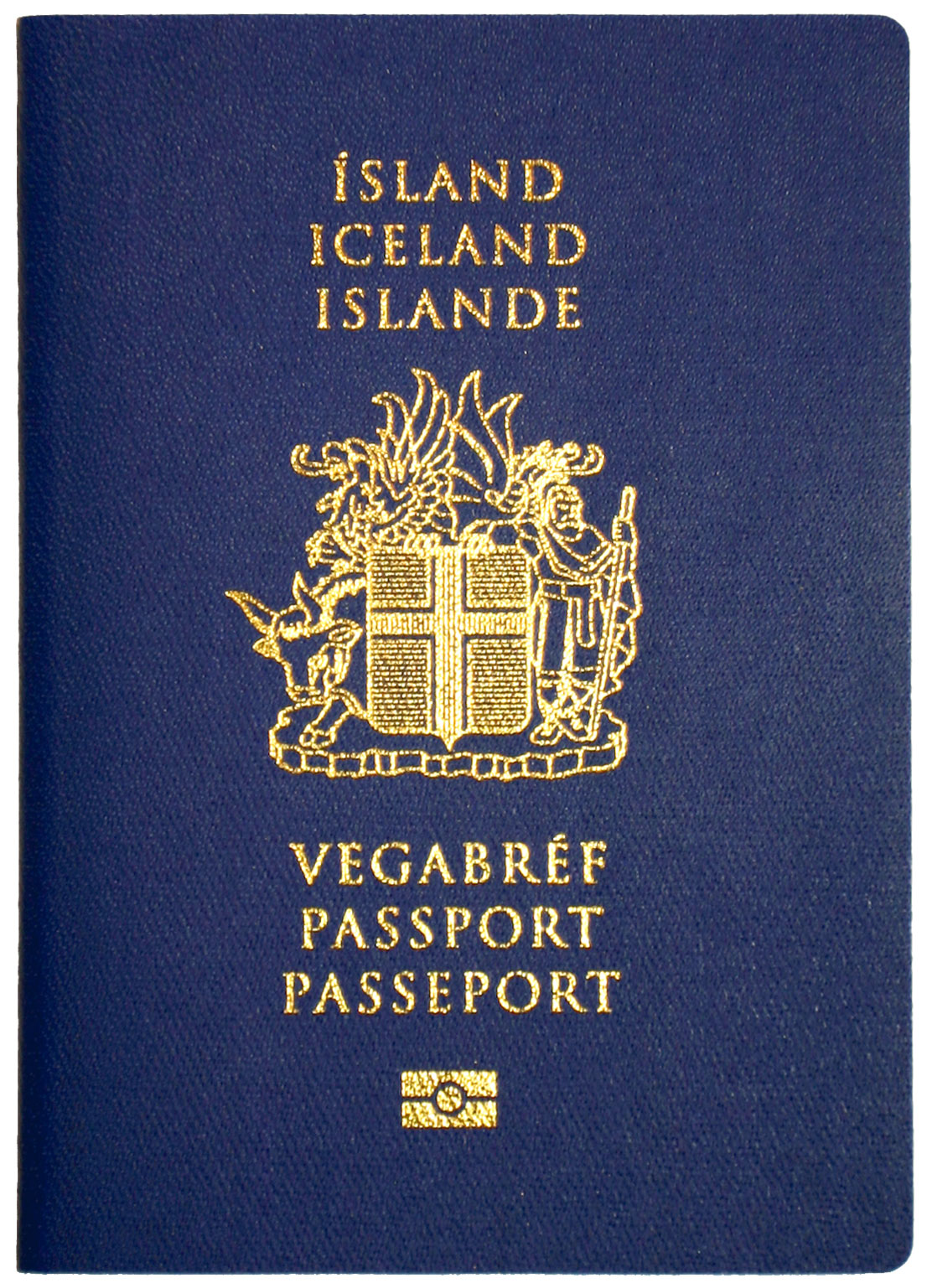
(European Free Trade Association) Iceland

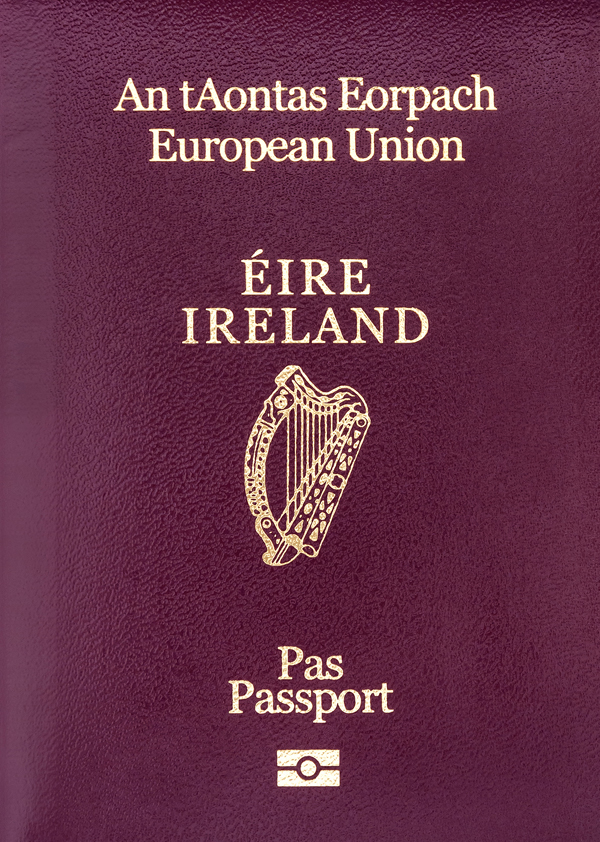
(European Union) (Republic of Ireland) Ireland

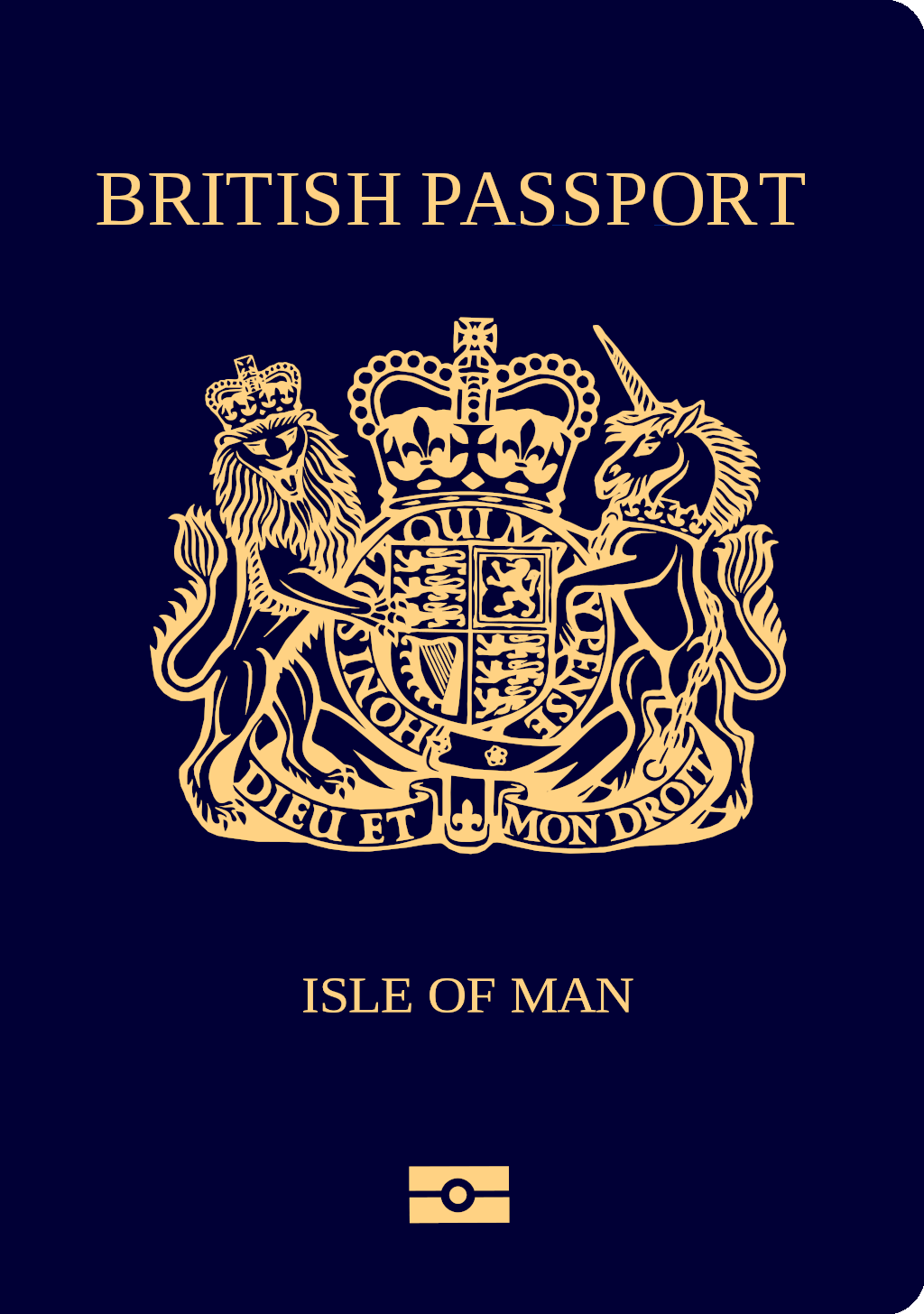
(United Kingdom) Isle of Man

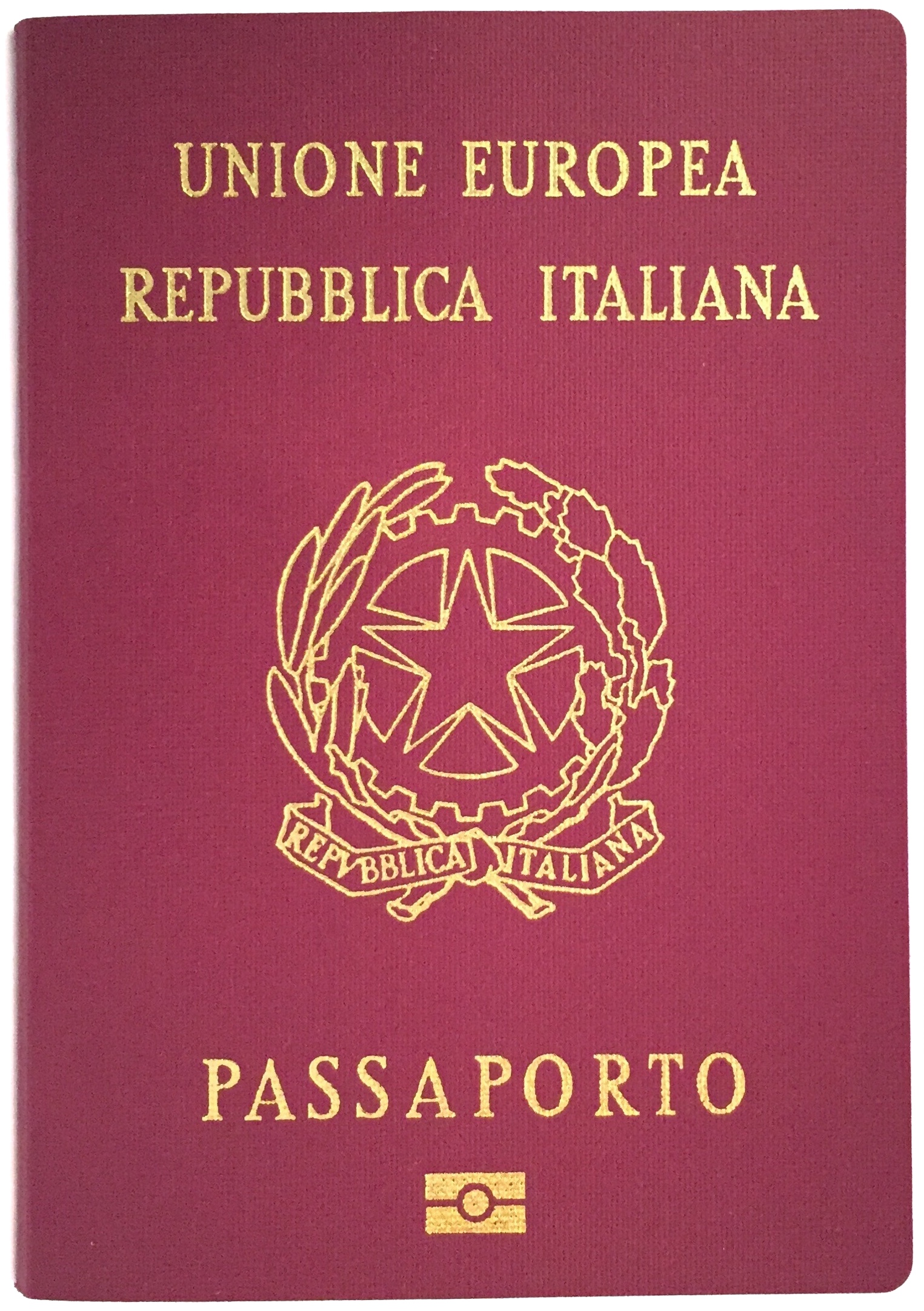
(European Union) Italy

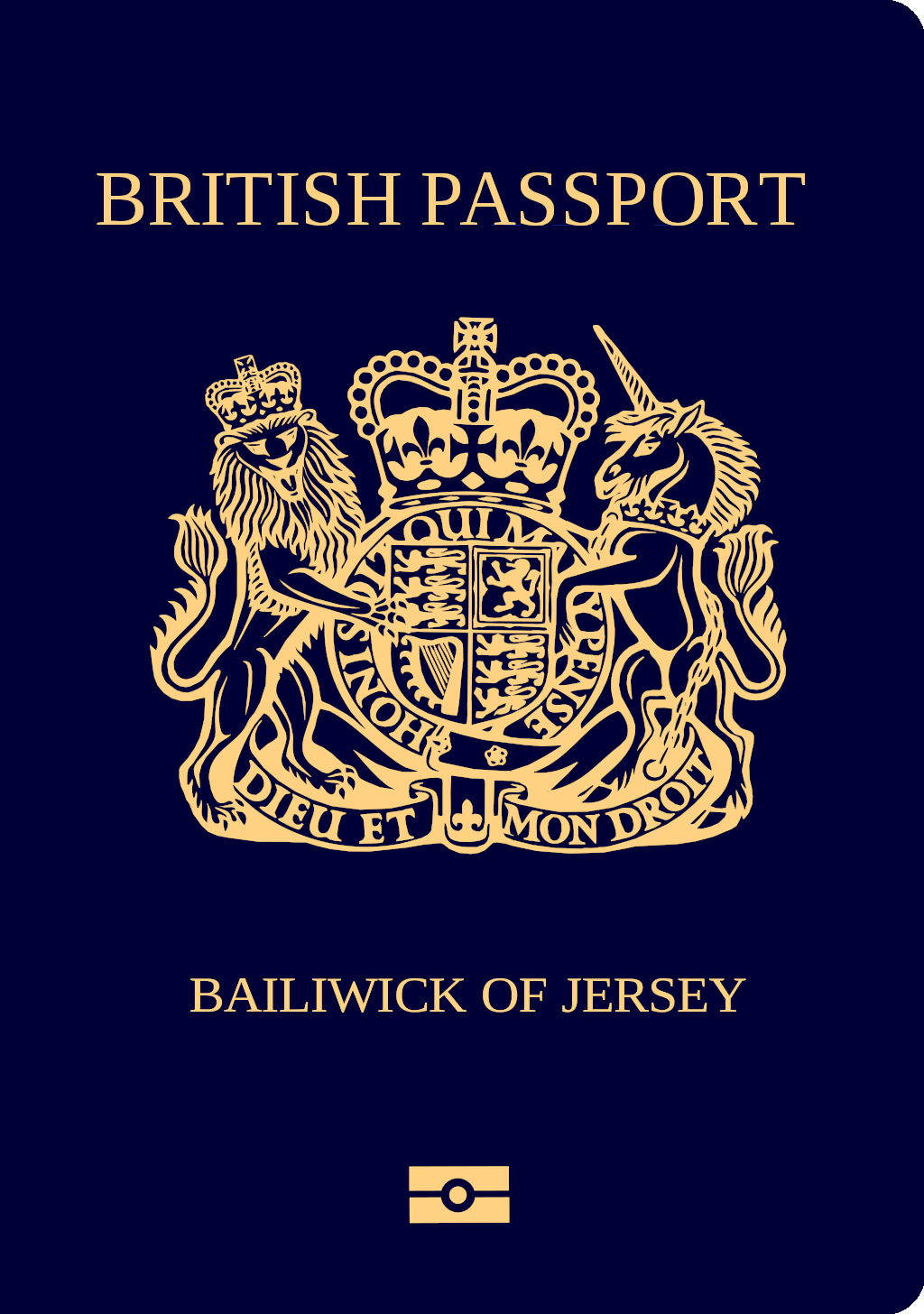
(United Kingdom) Jersey

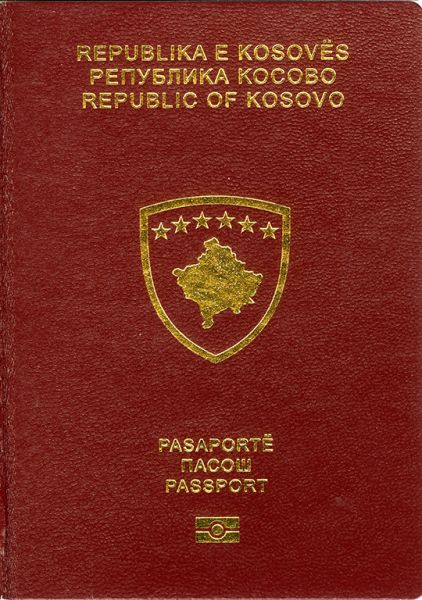
Kosovo

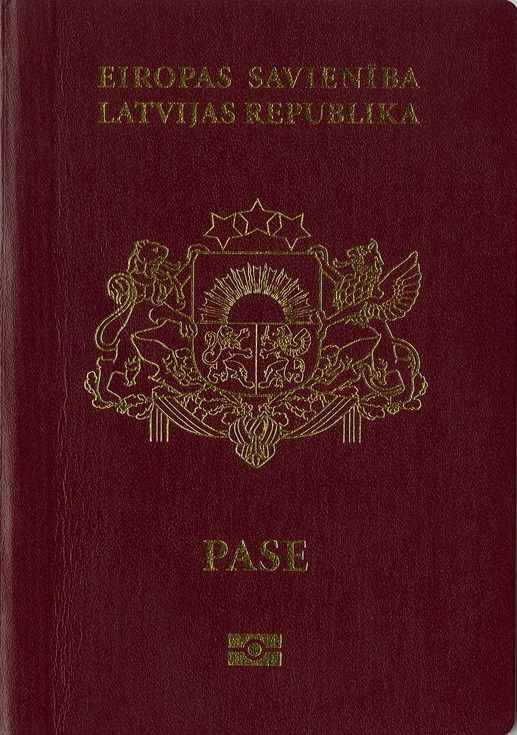
(European Union) Latvia

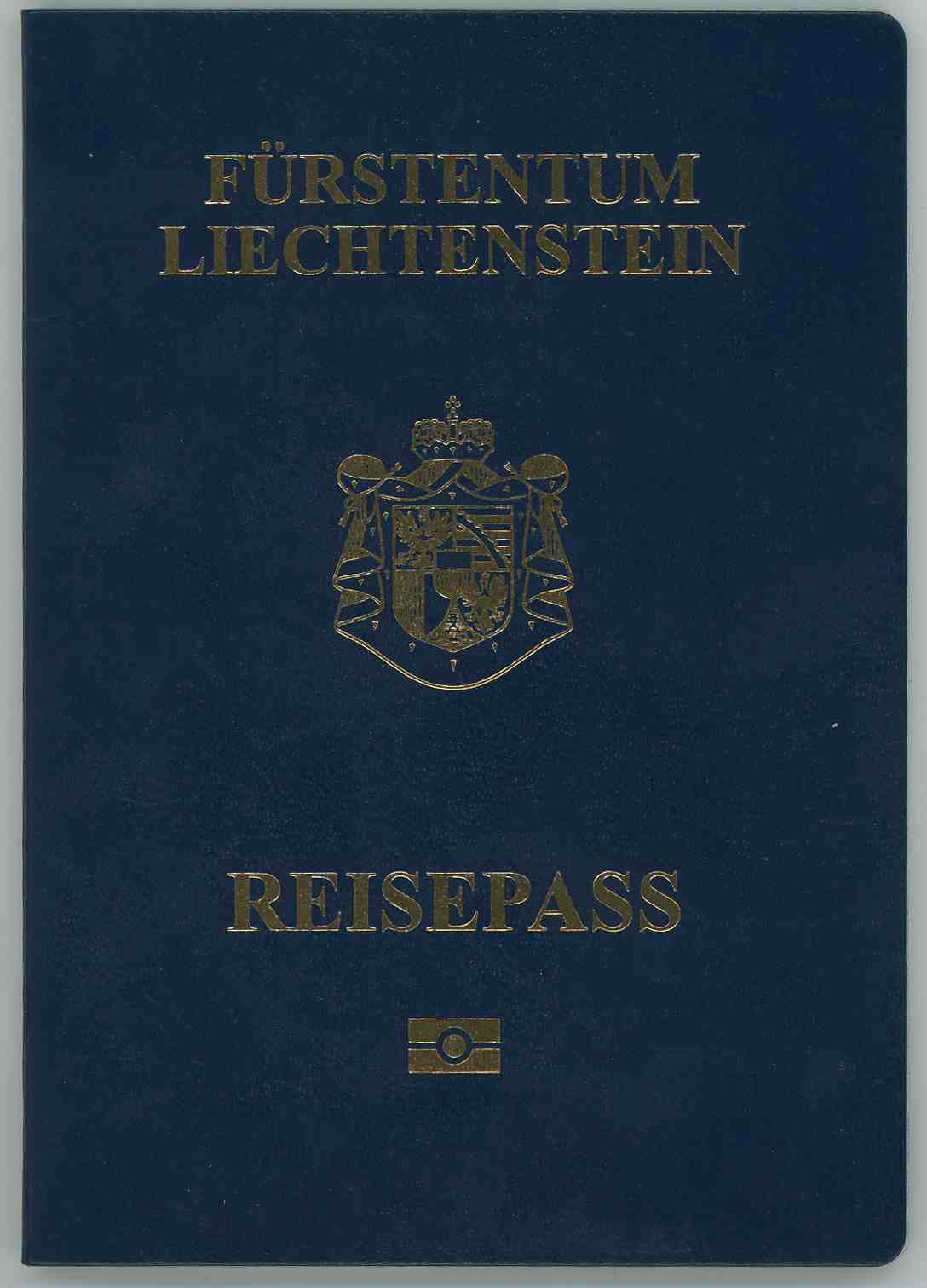
(European Free Trade Association) Liechtenstein

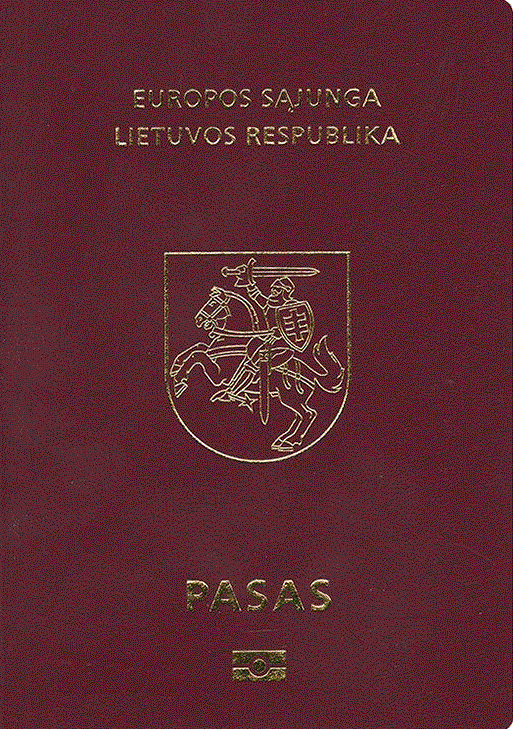
(European Union) Lithuania

(European Union) Luxembourg

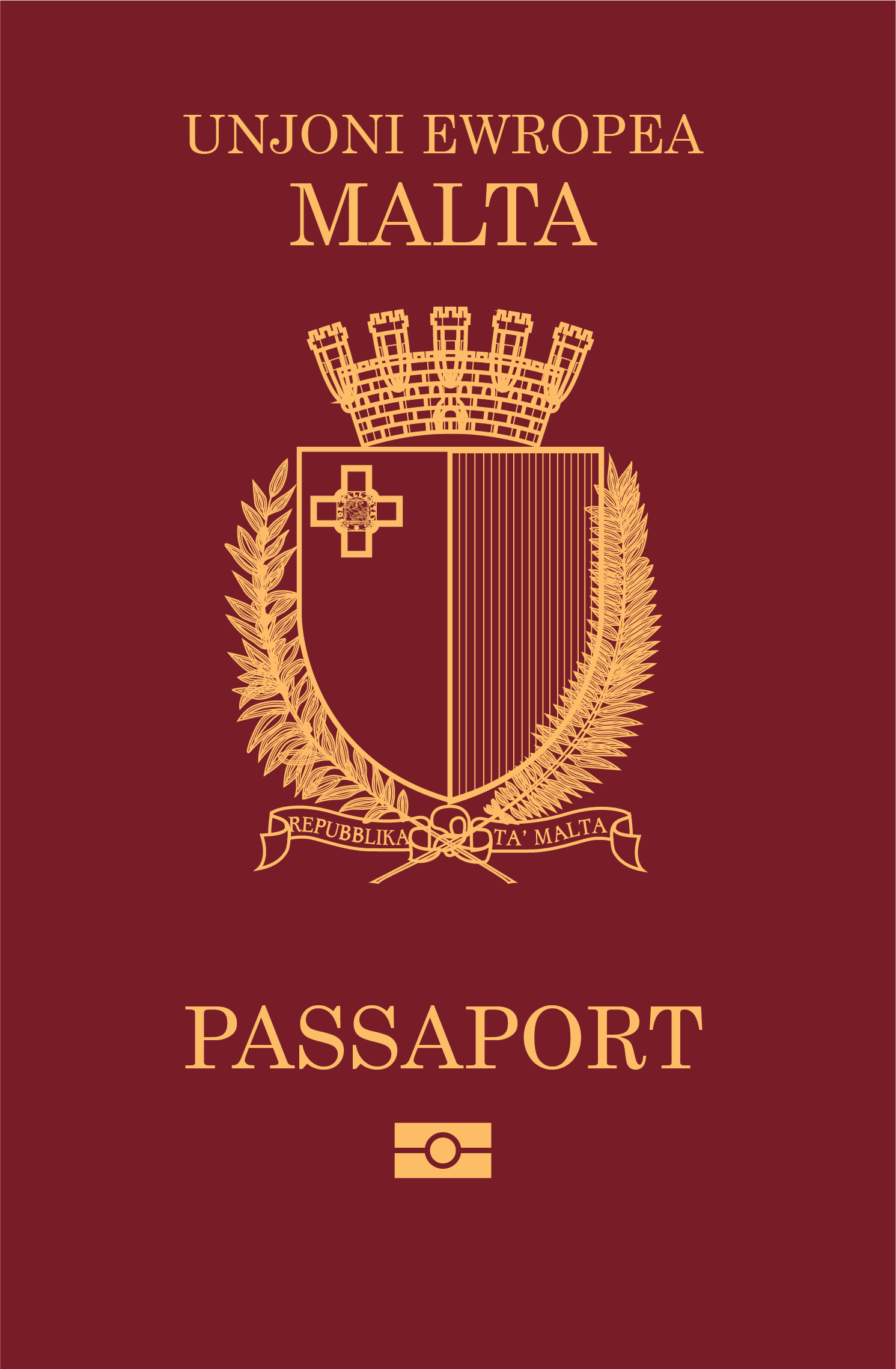
(European Union) Malta

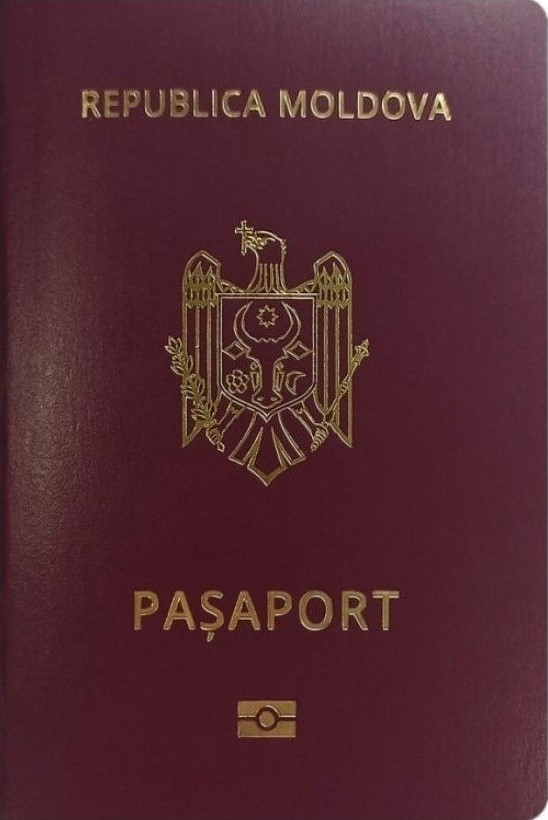
(Commonwealth of Independent States) Moldova

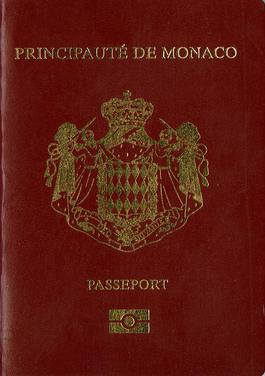
Monaco

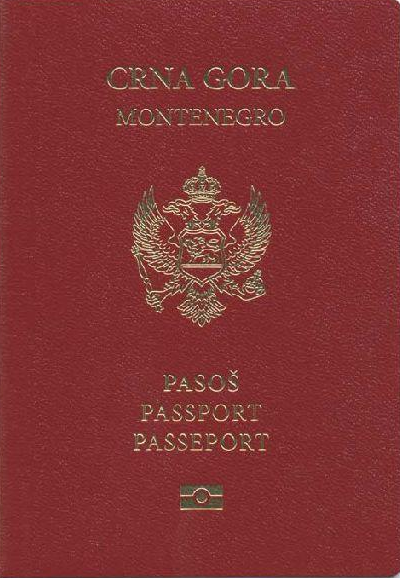
Montenegro

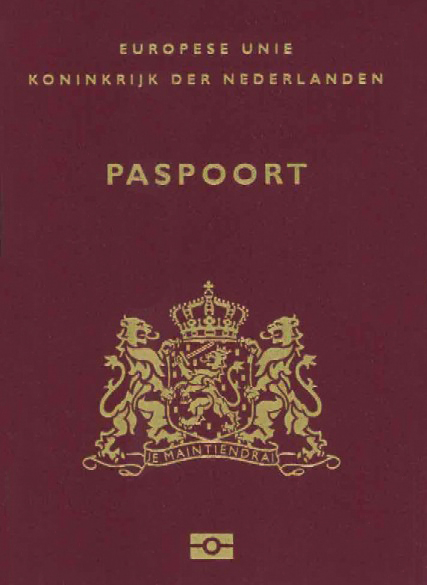
(European Union) Netherlands

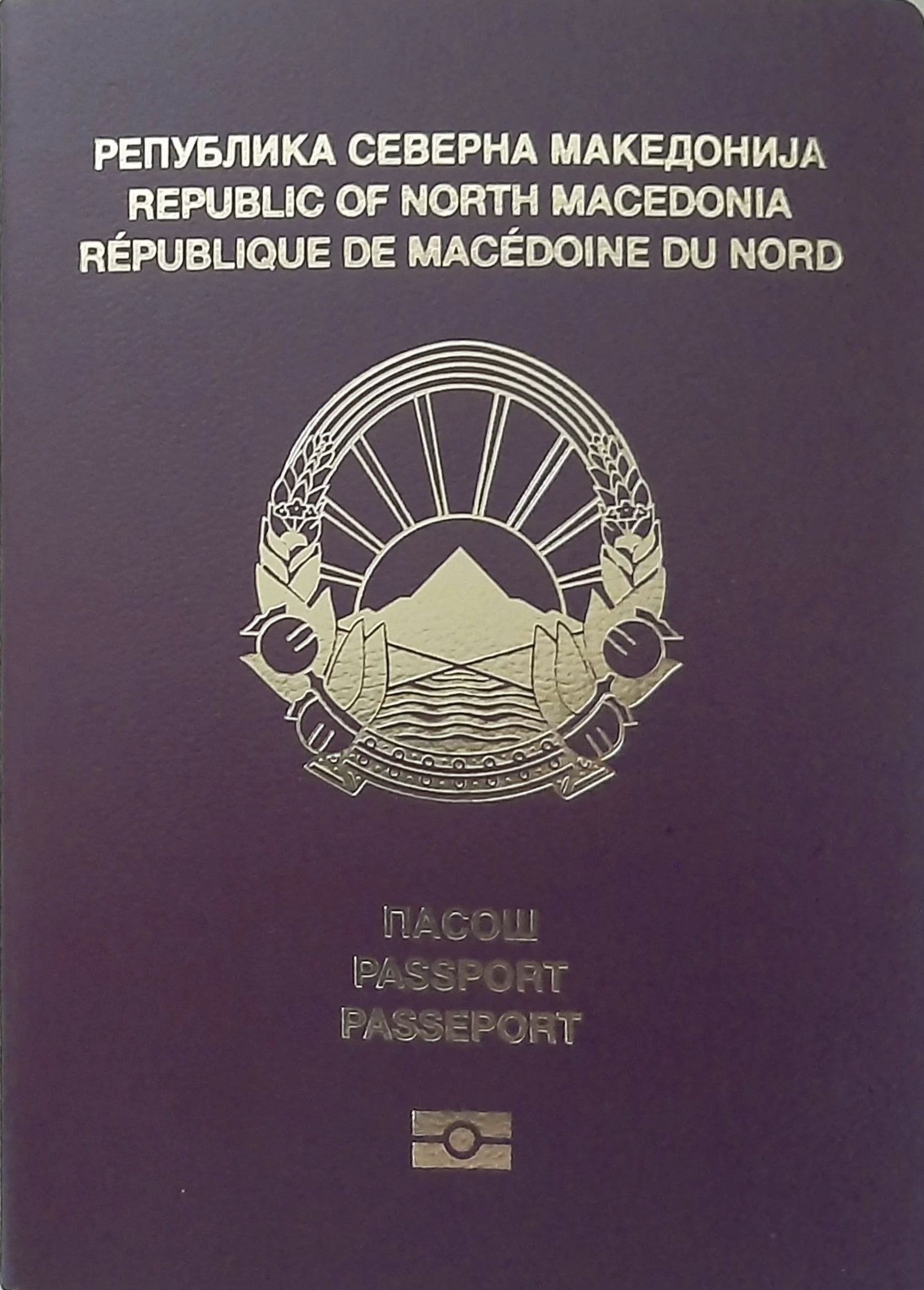
North Macedonia

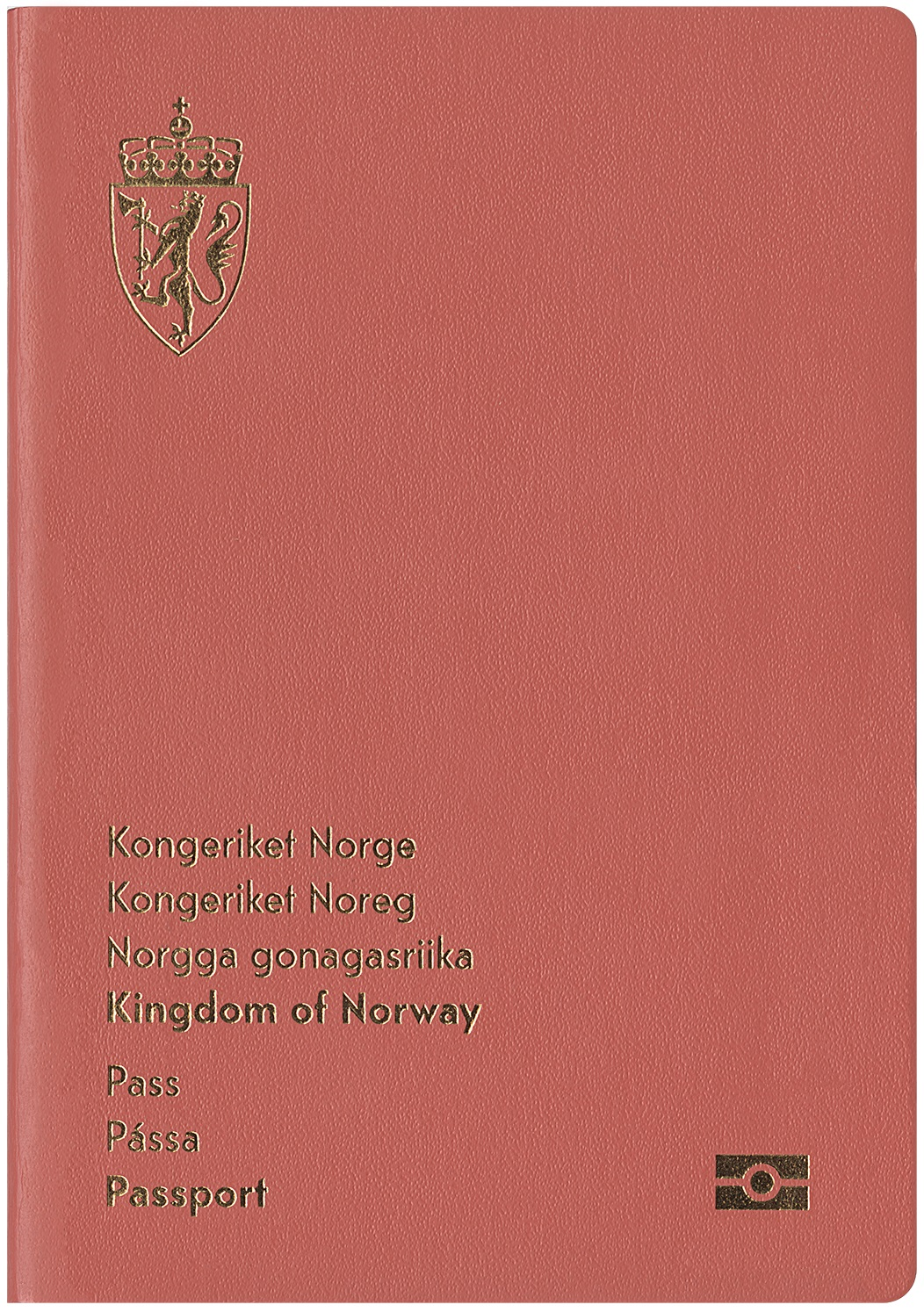
(European Free Trade Association) Norway

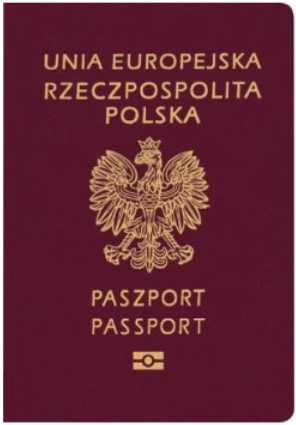
(European Union) Poland

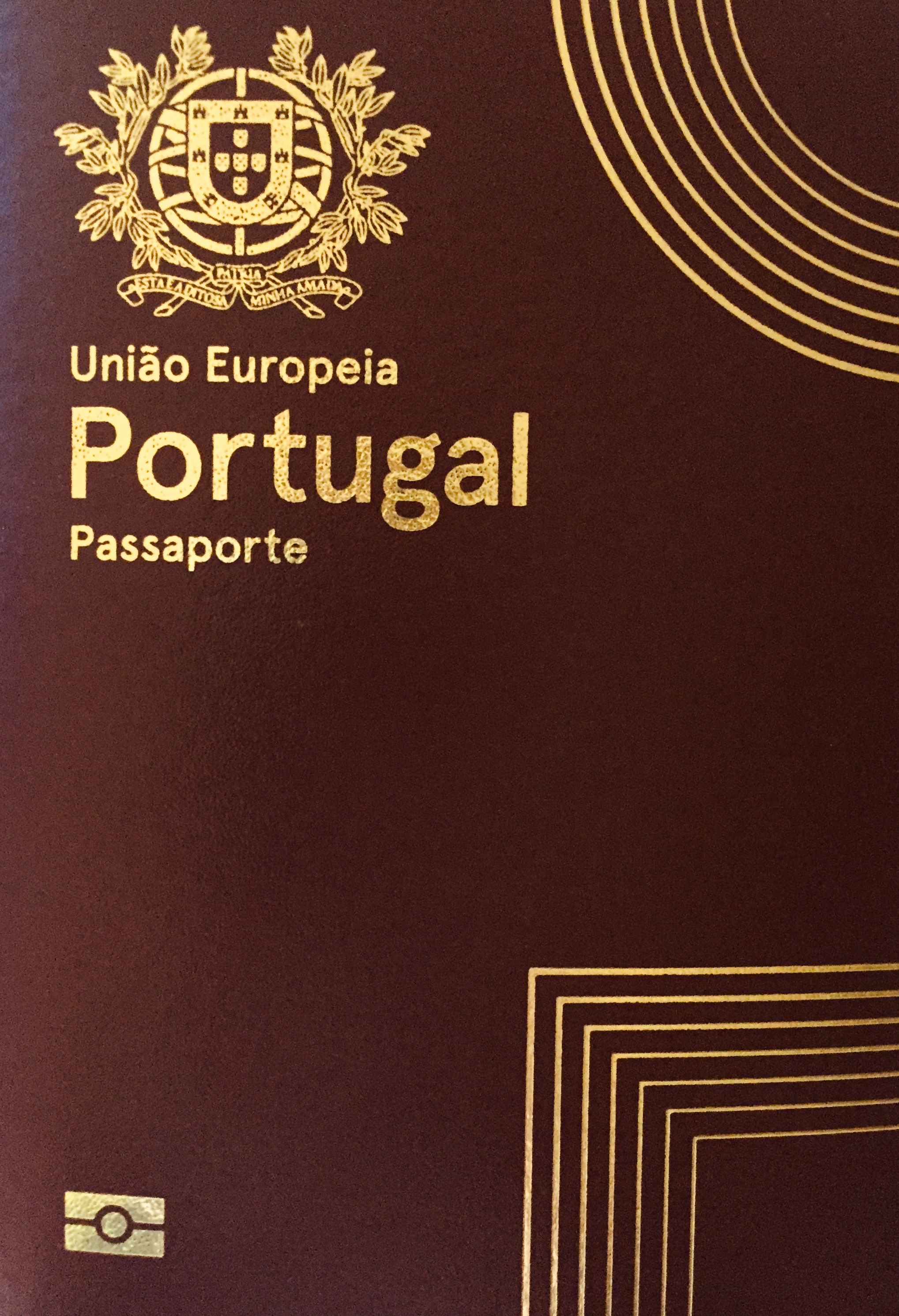
(European Union) Portugal

(European Union) Romania

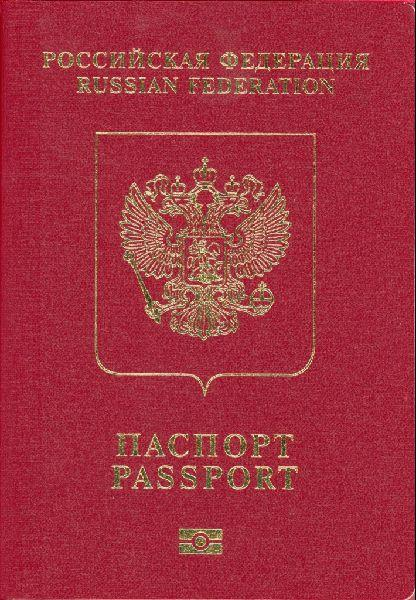
(Commonwealth of Independent States) (Eurasian Economic Union) Russia

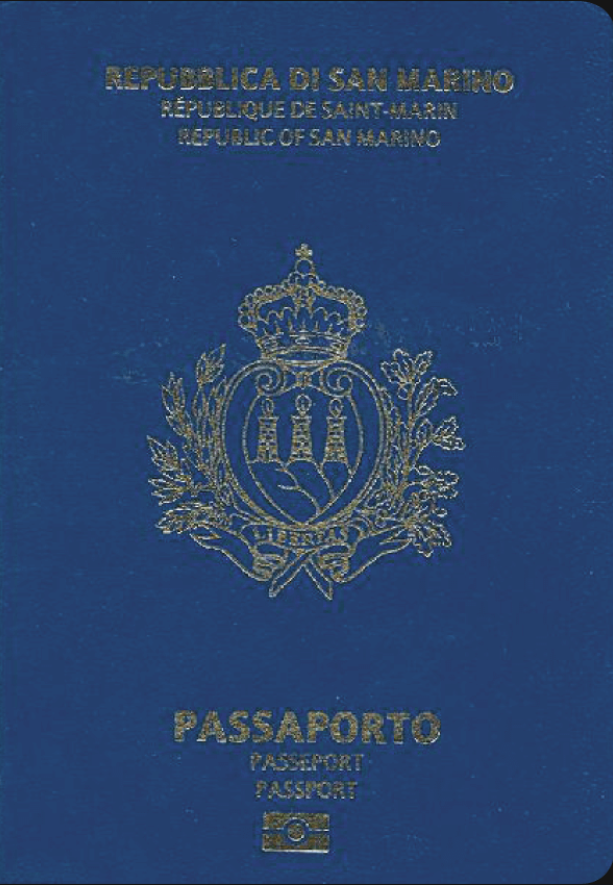
San Marino

Serbia

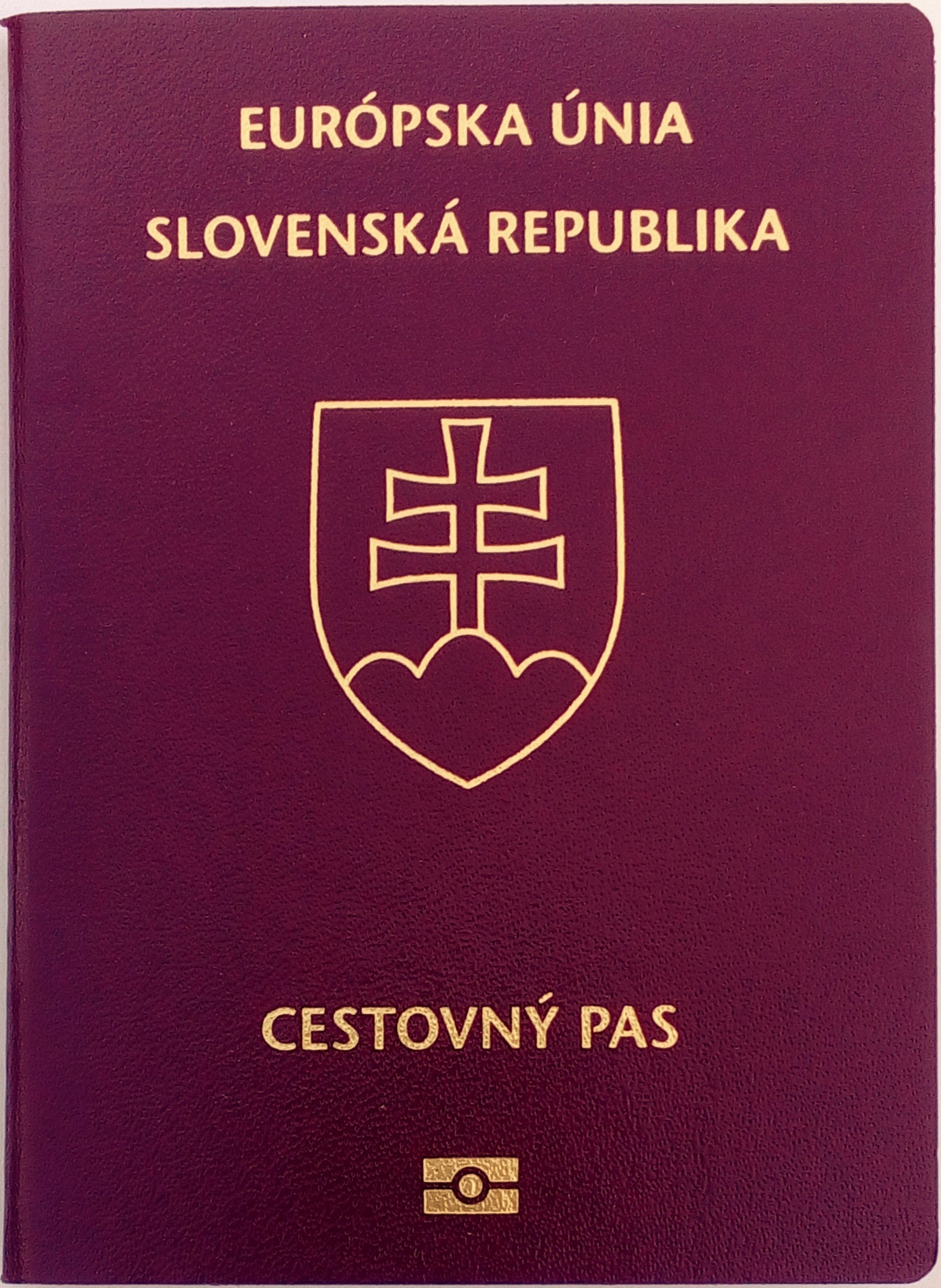
(European Union) Slovakia

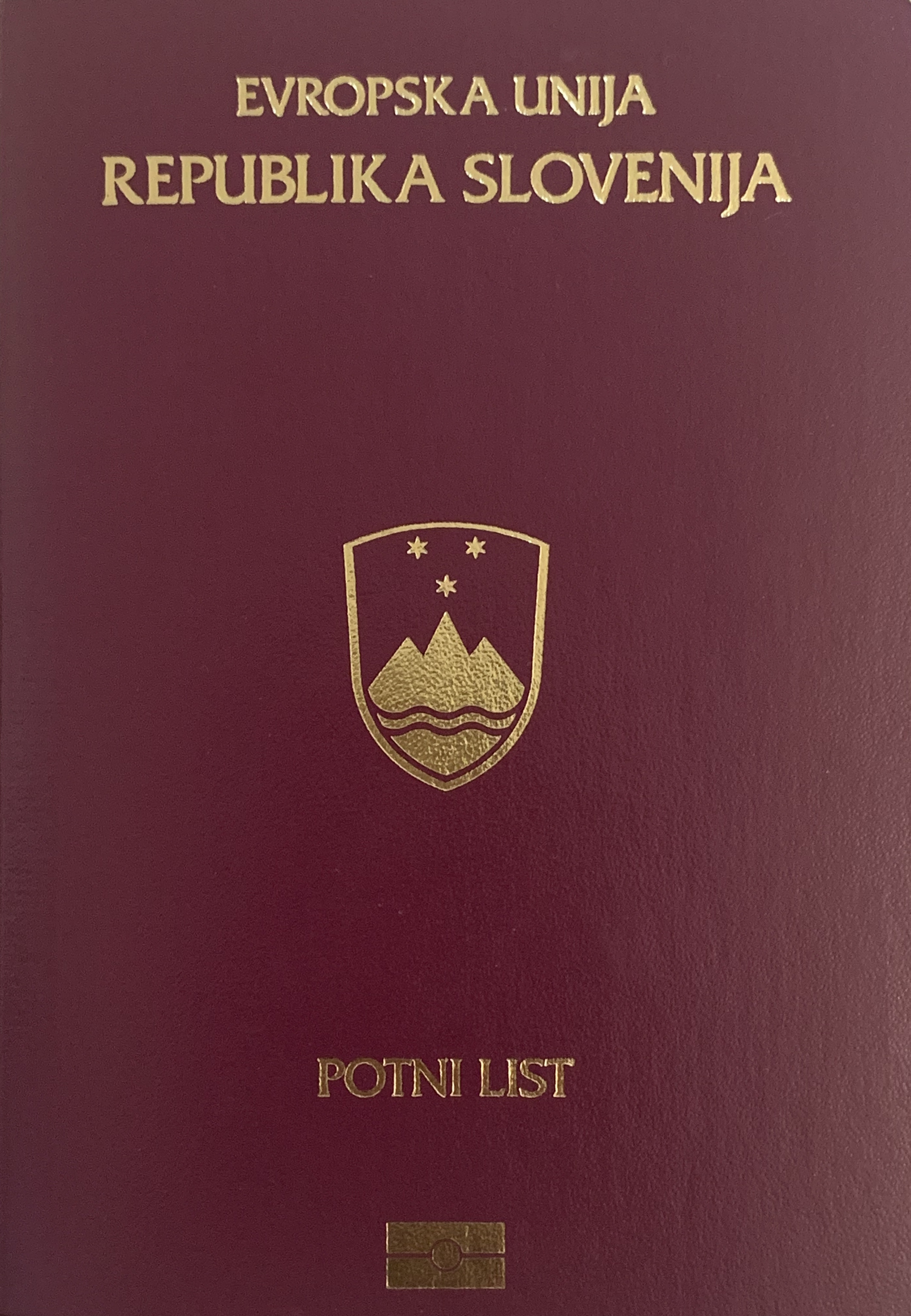
(European Union) Slovenia

(European Union) Spain

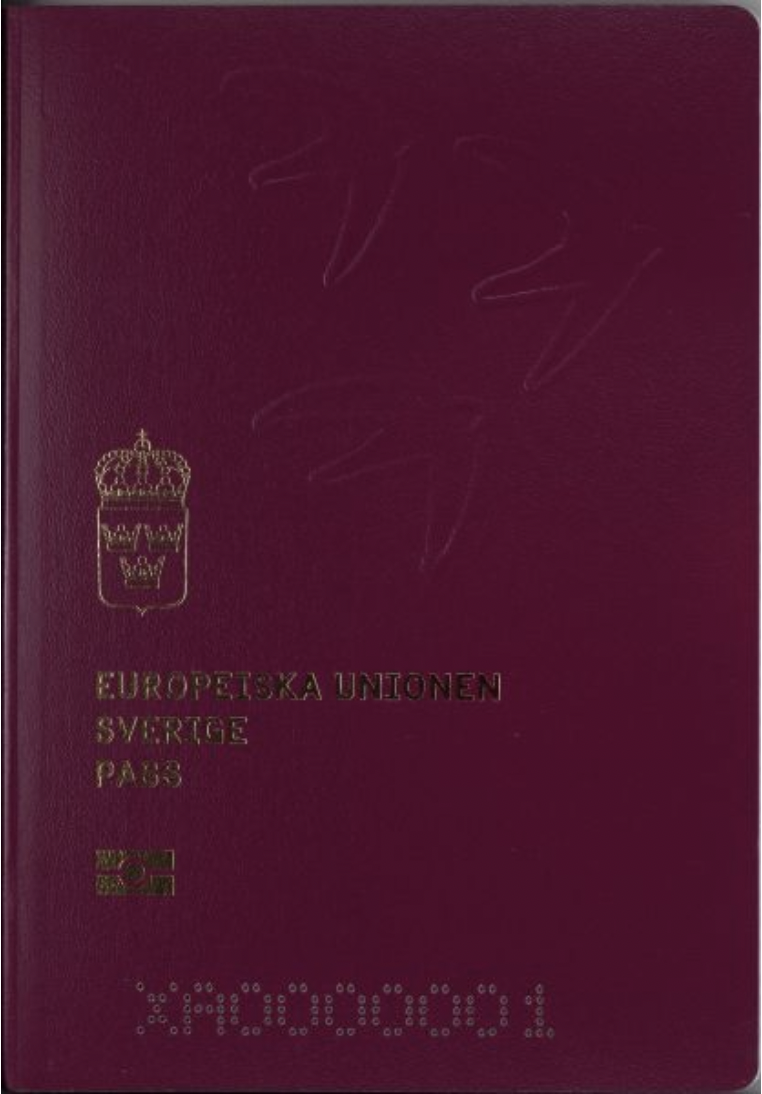
(European Union) Sweden

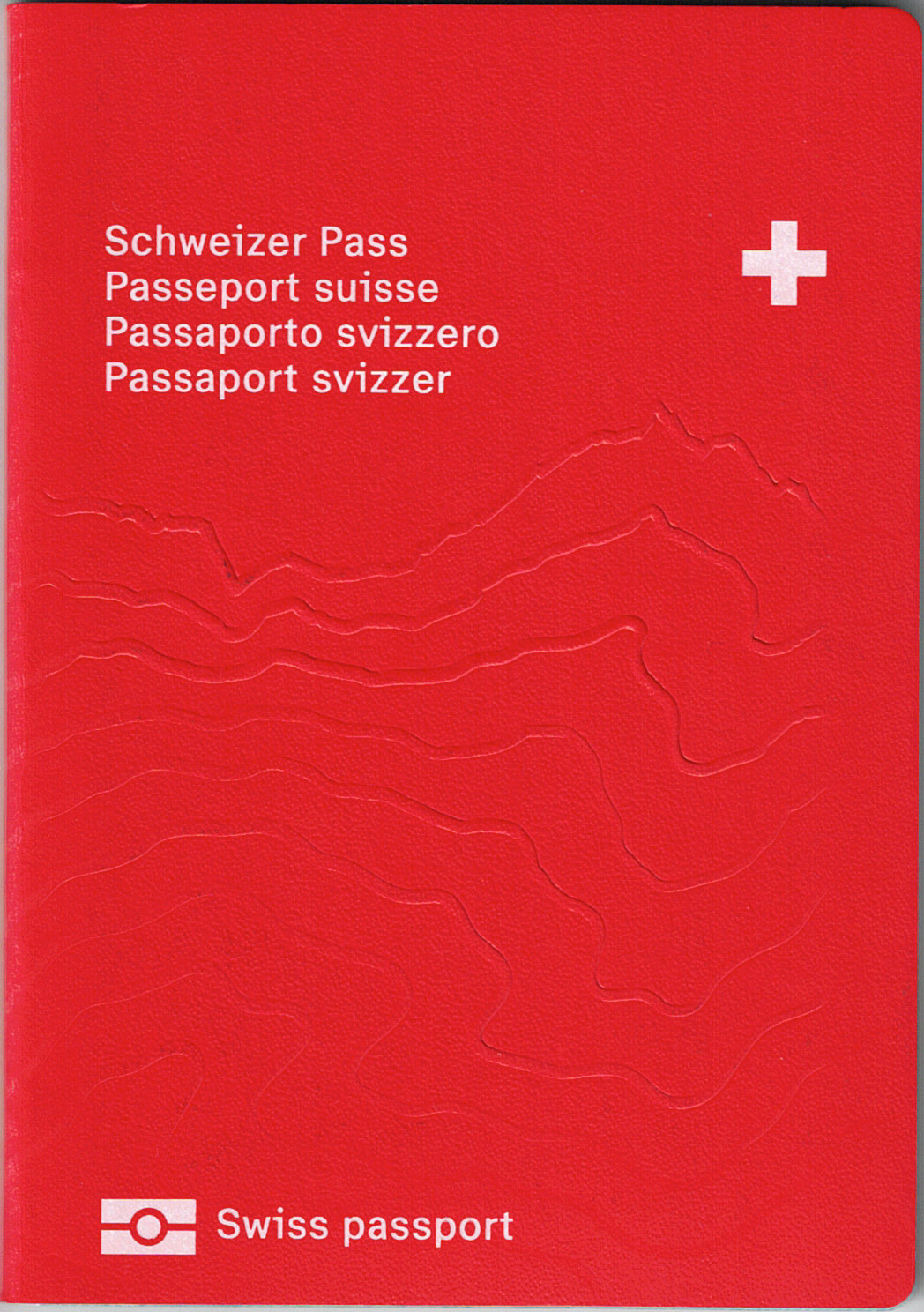
(European Free Trade Association) Switzerland

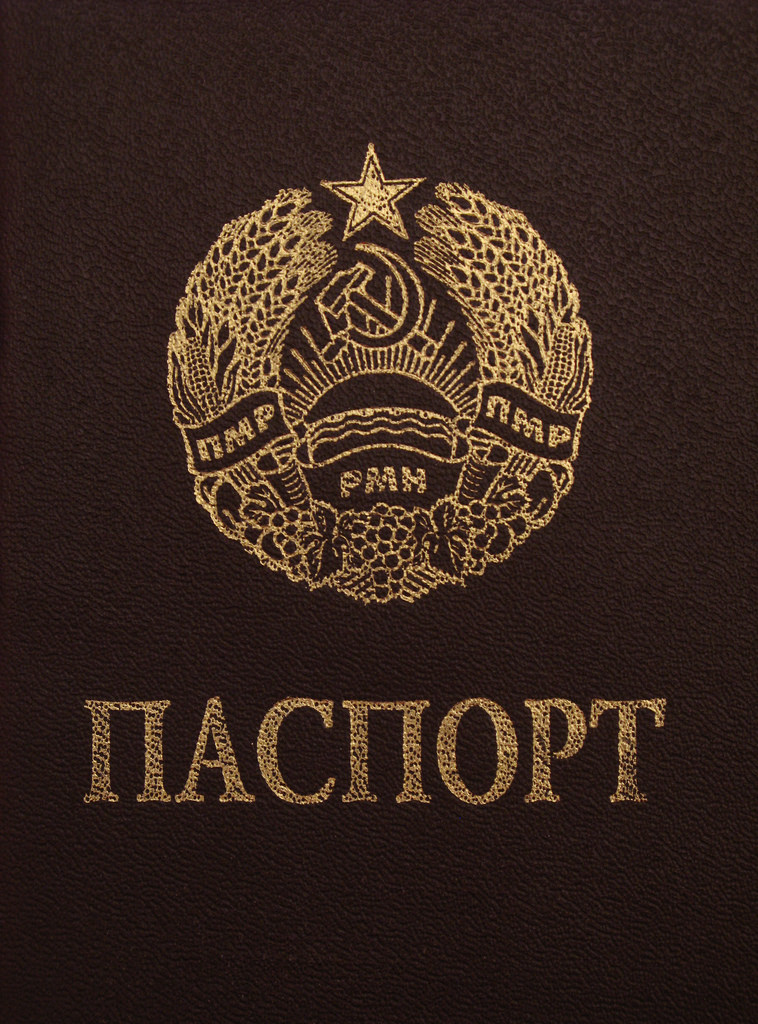
Transnistria

Turkey

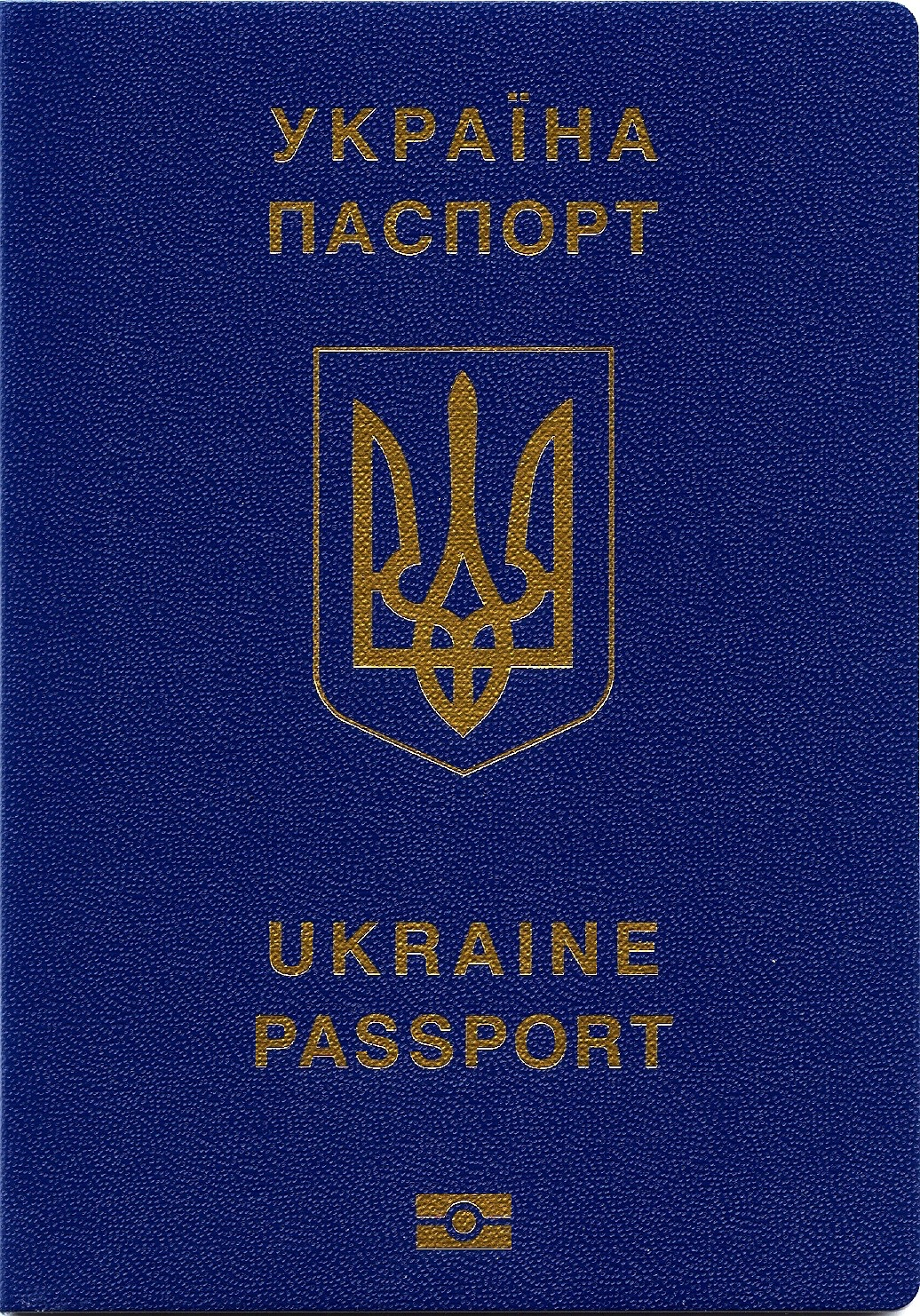
Ukraine

United Kingdom

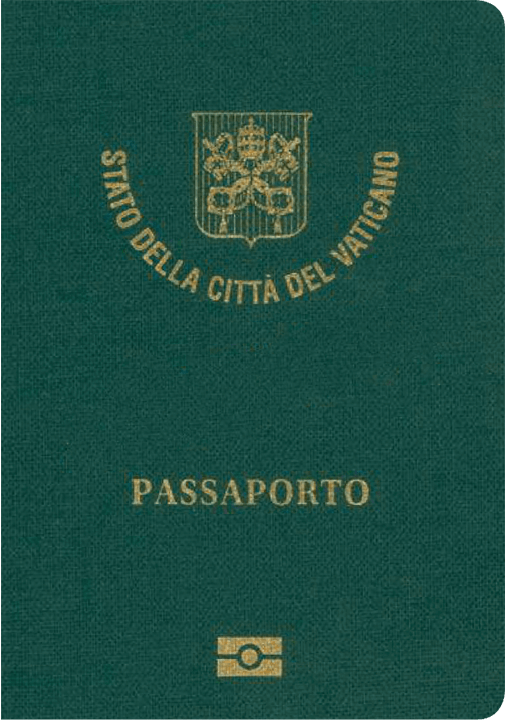
Vatican City

=== Oceania ===

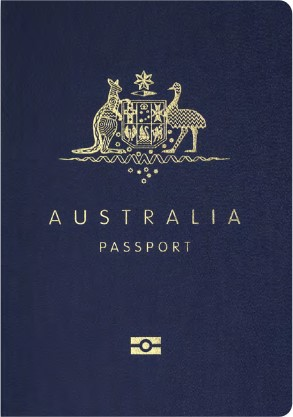
Australia

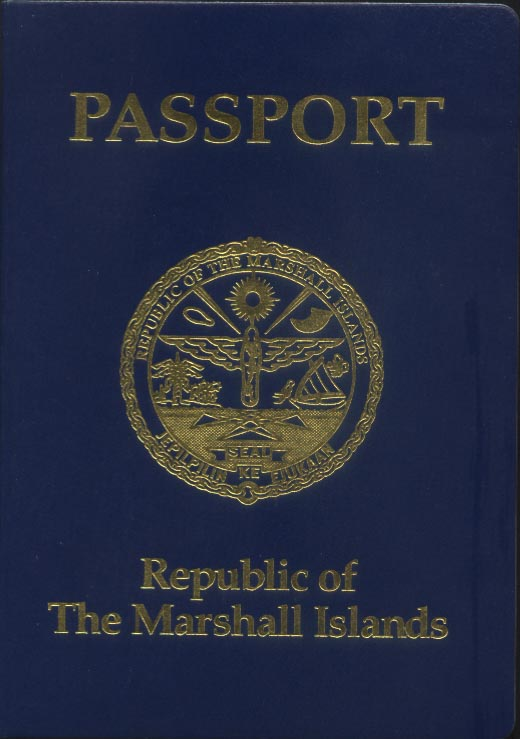
Marshall Islands

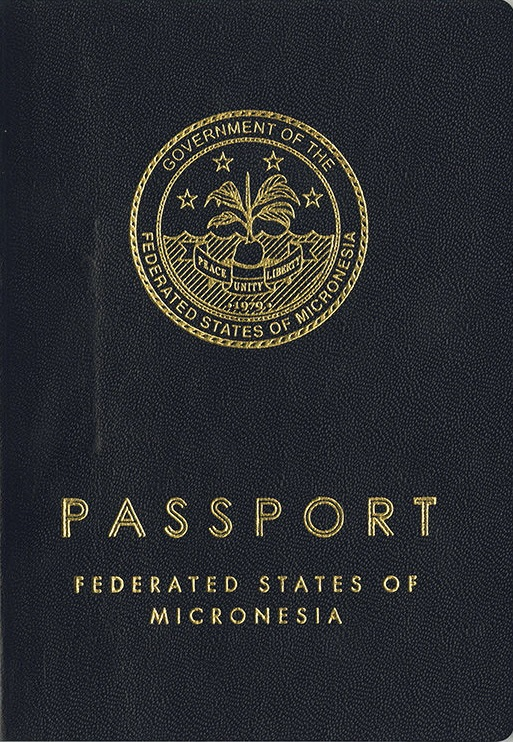
(Federated States of Micronesia) Micronesia

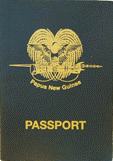
Papua New Guinea

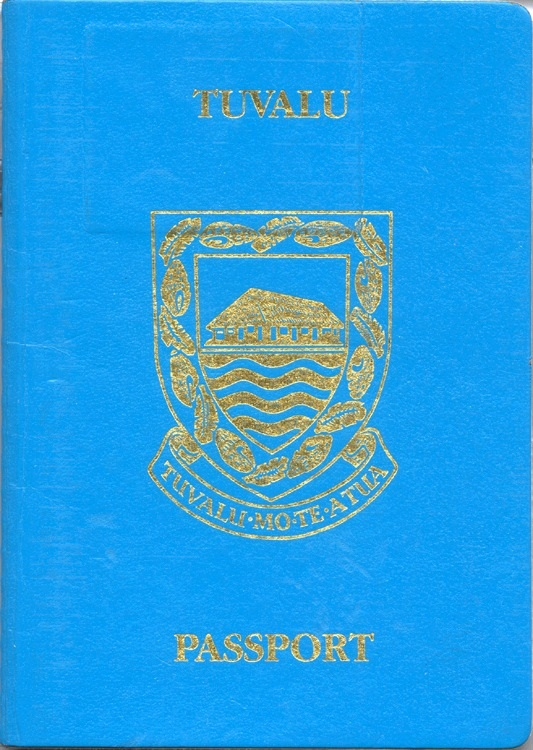
Tuvalu

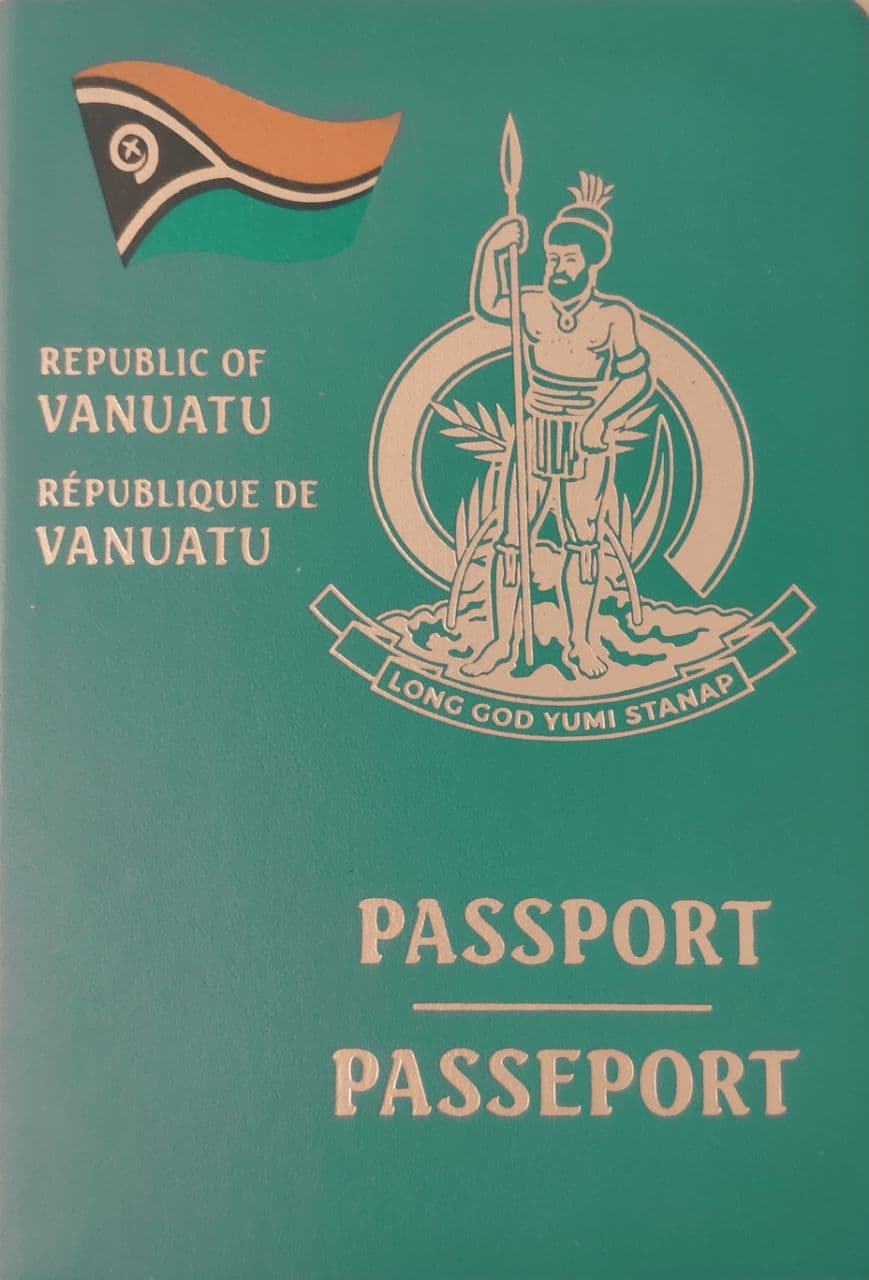
Vanuatu

== International organizations and sovereign subjects of international law ==
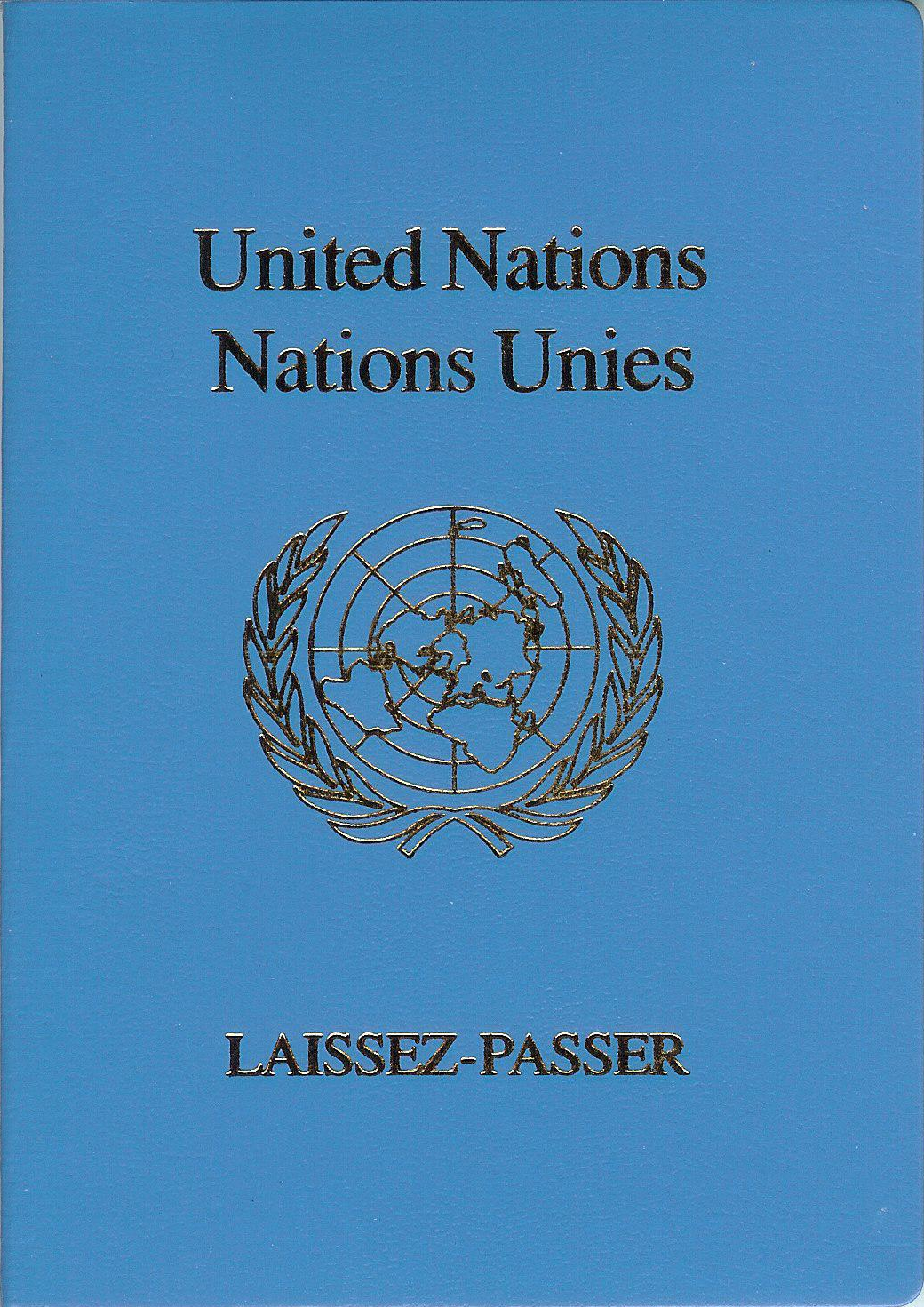
(United Nations) United Nations
Laissez-Passer

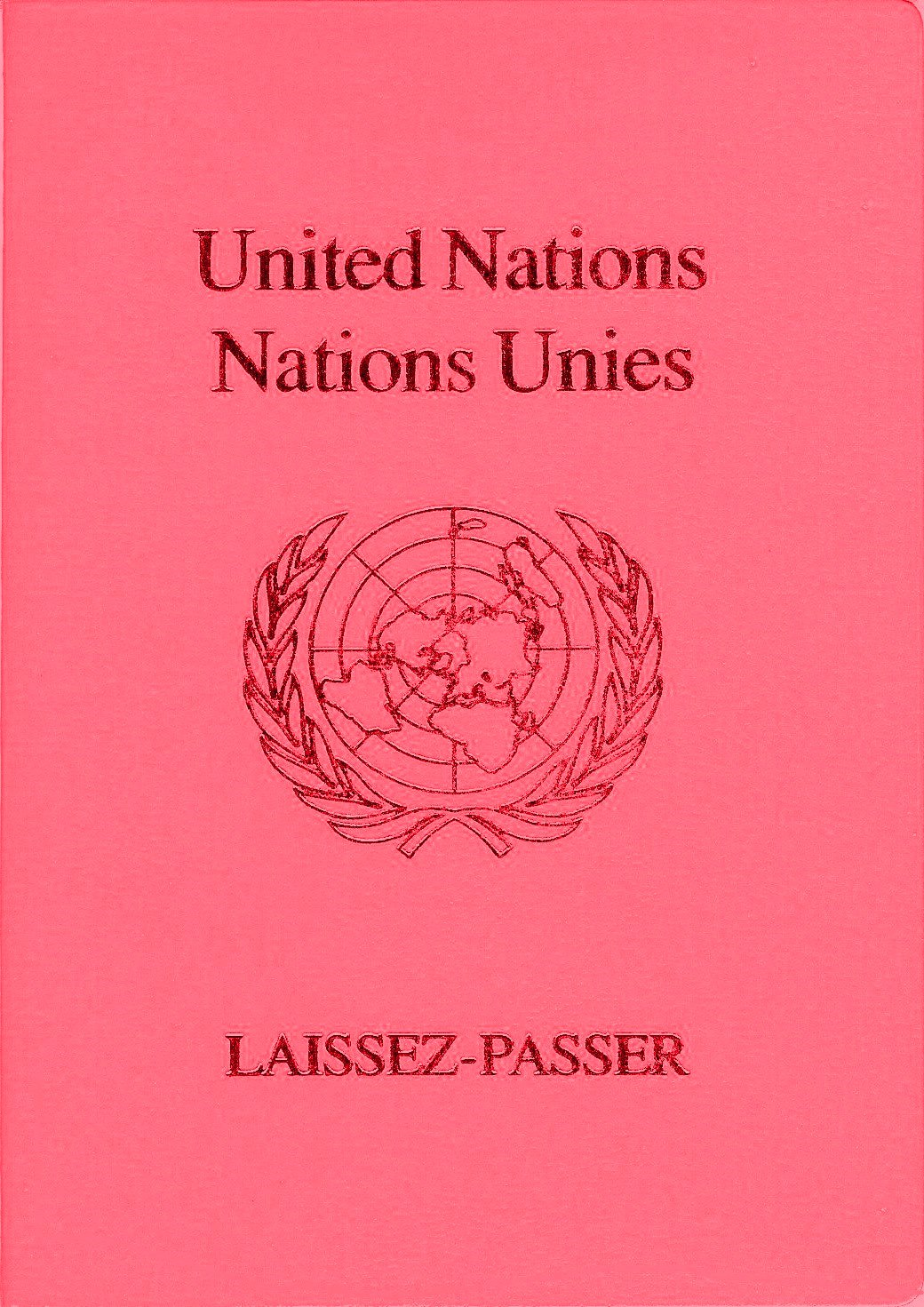
(United Nations) United Nations
Diplomatic Laissez-Passer

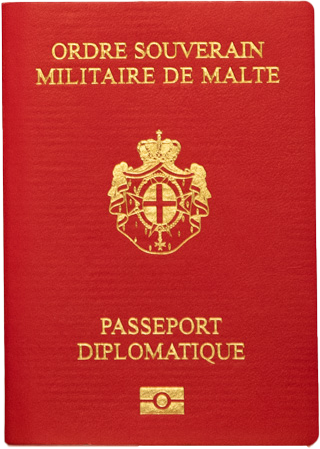
Sovereign Military Order of Malta

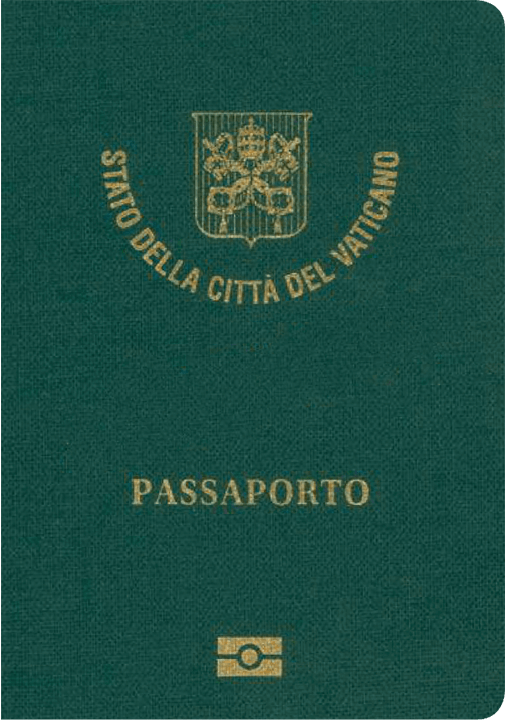
Holy See

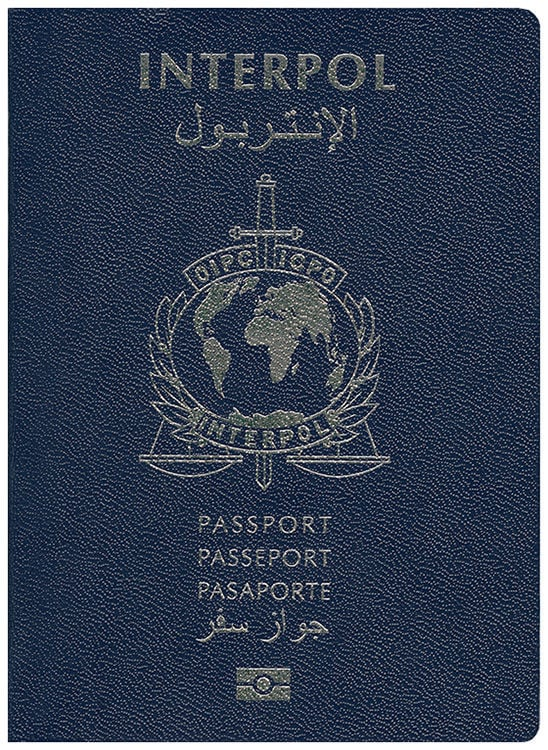
Interpol Travel Document
- European Union laissez-passer

== Contemporary diplomatic passports ==
Algeria

Bangladesh

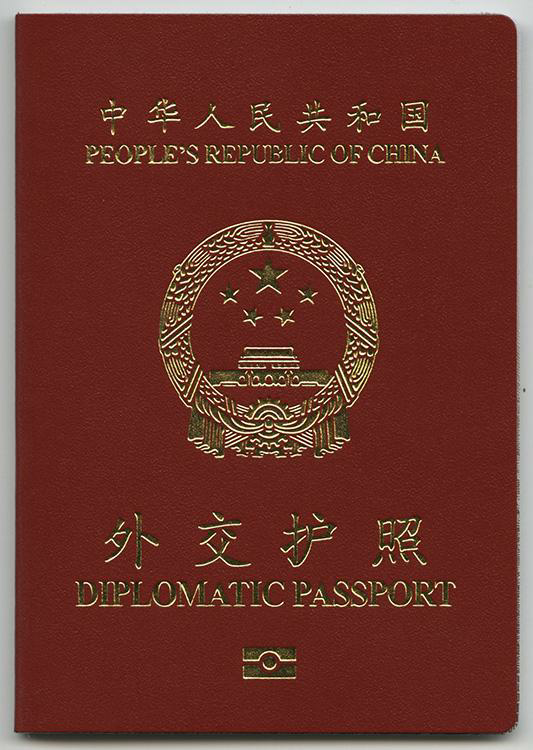
China

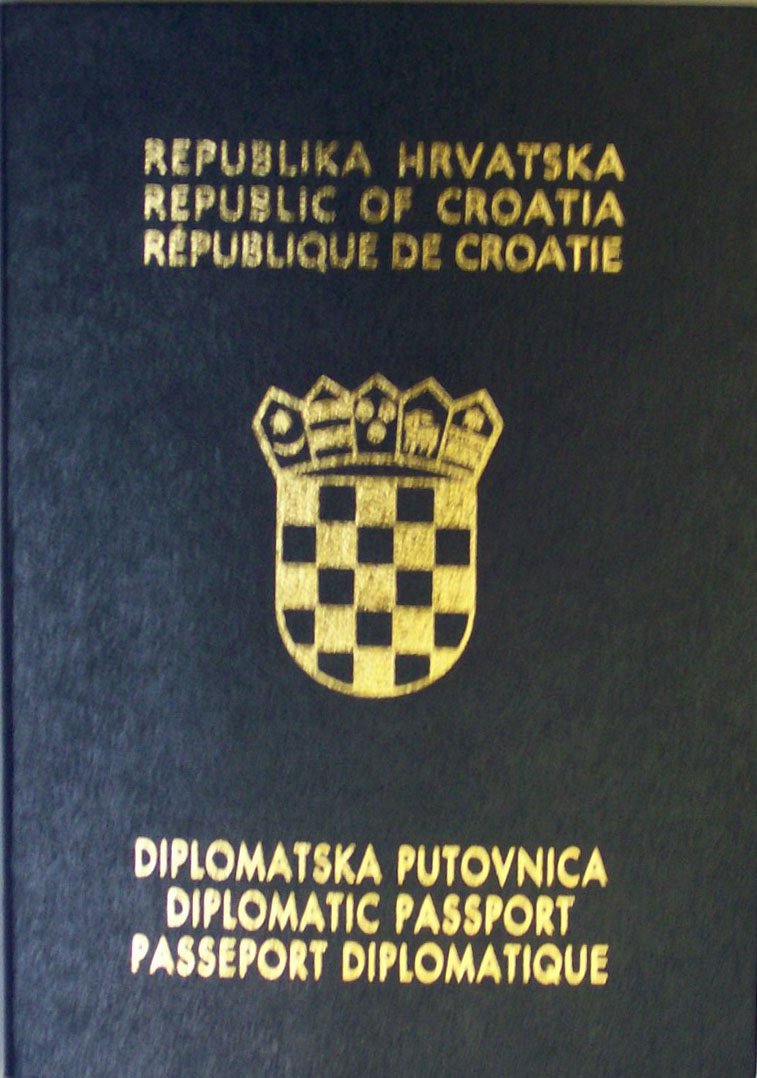
Croatia

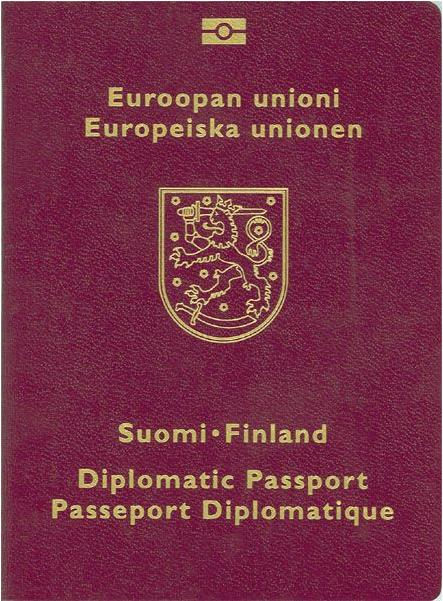
Finland

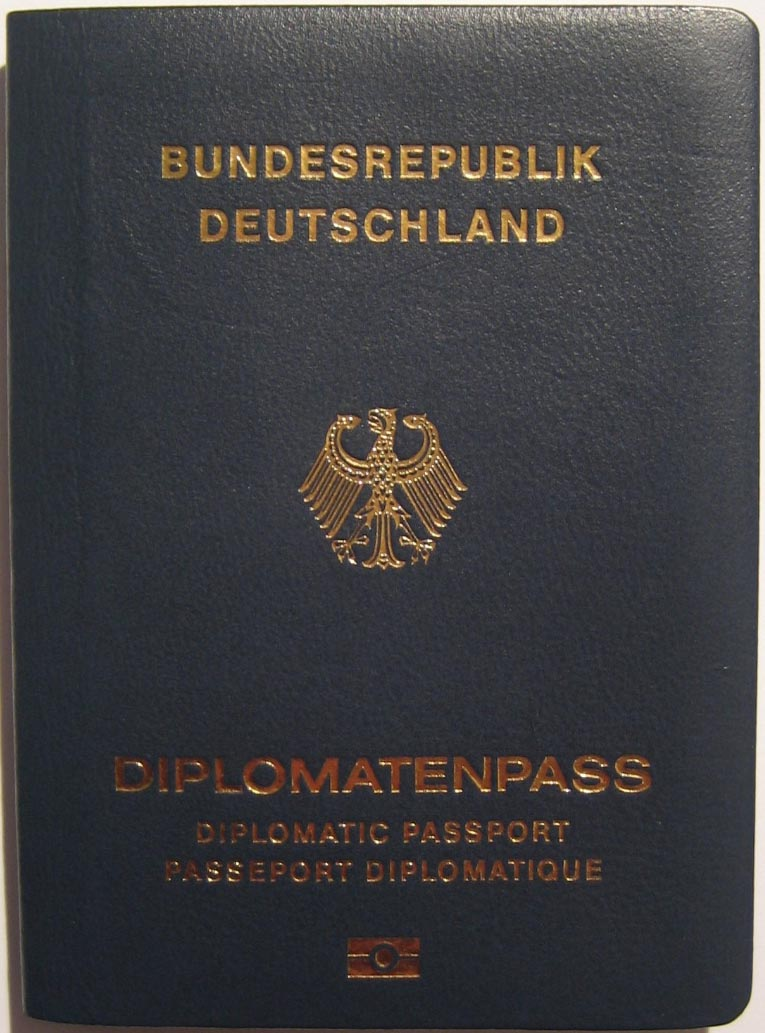
Germany

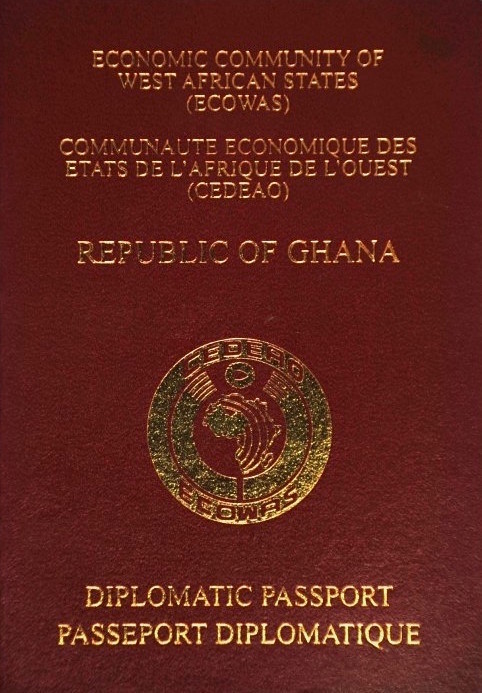
Ghana

Greece

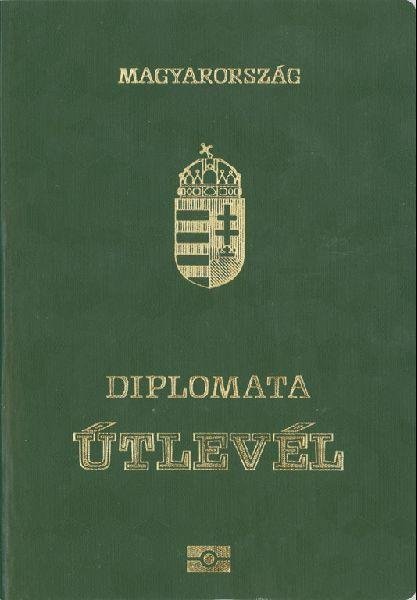
Hungary

India

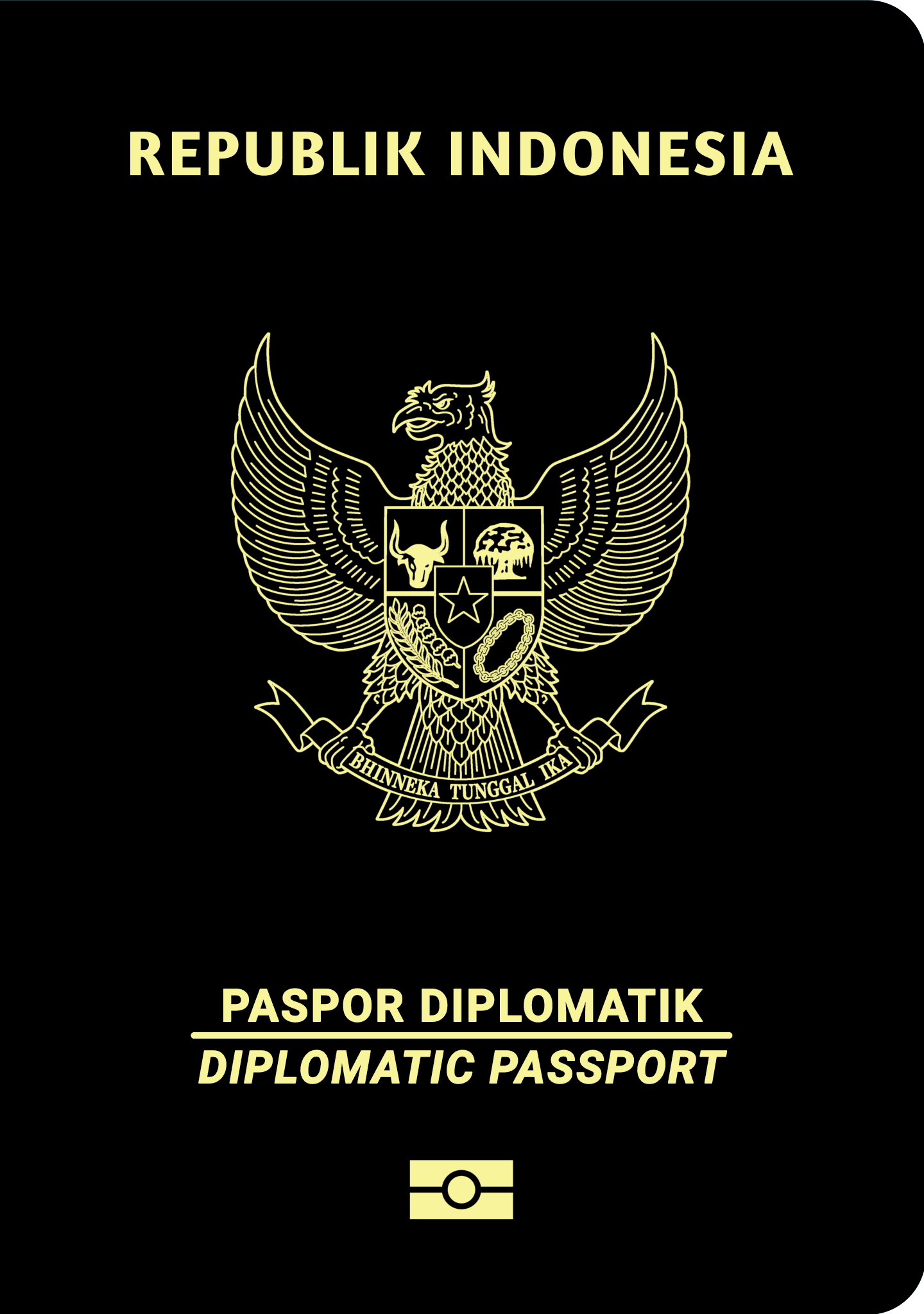
Indonesia

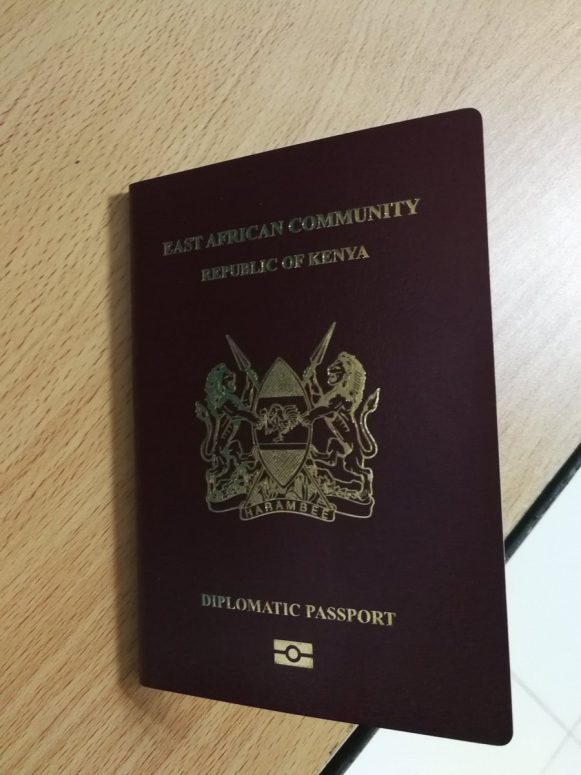
Kenya

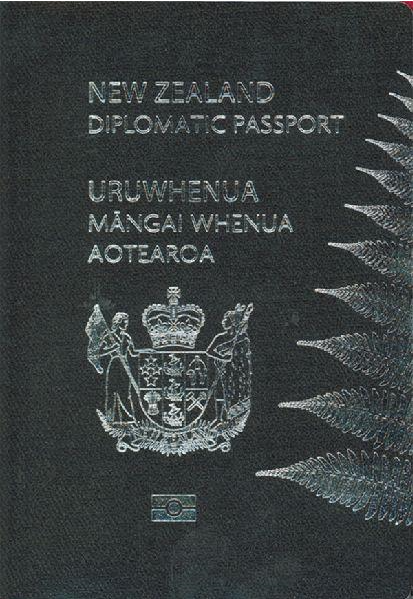
New Zealand

Poland

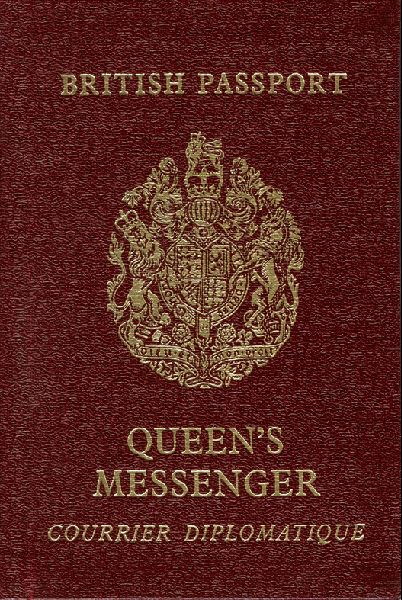
King's Messenger passport

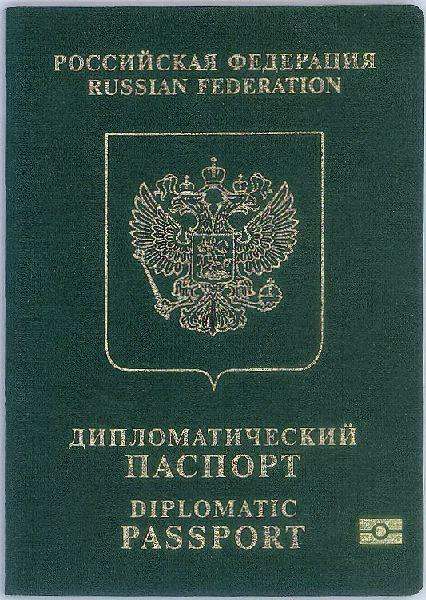
Russia

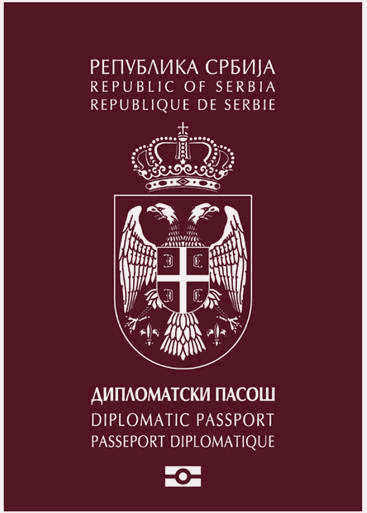
Serbia

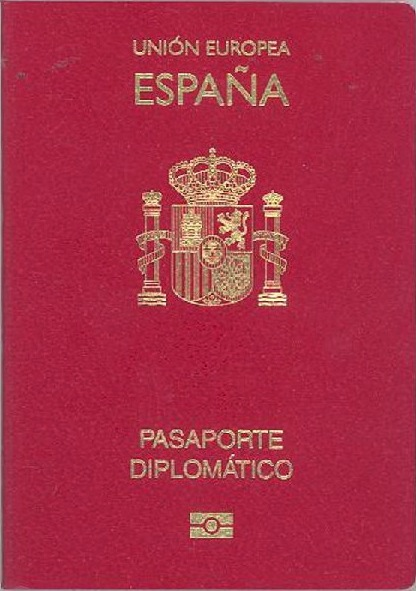
Spain

Turkey

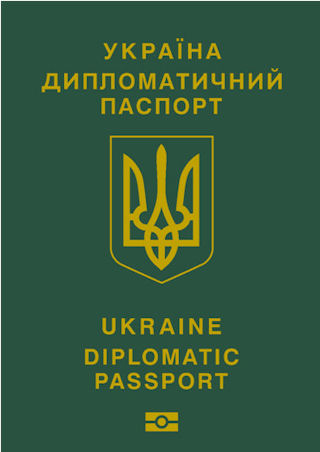
Ukraine

United States

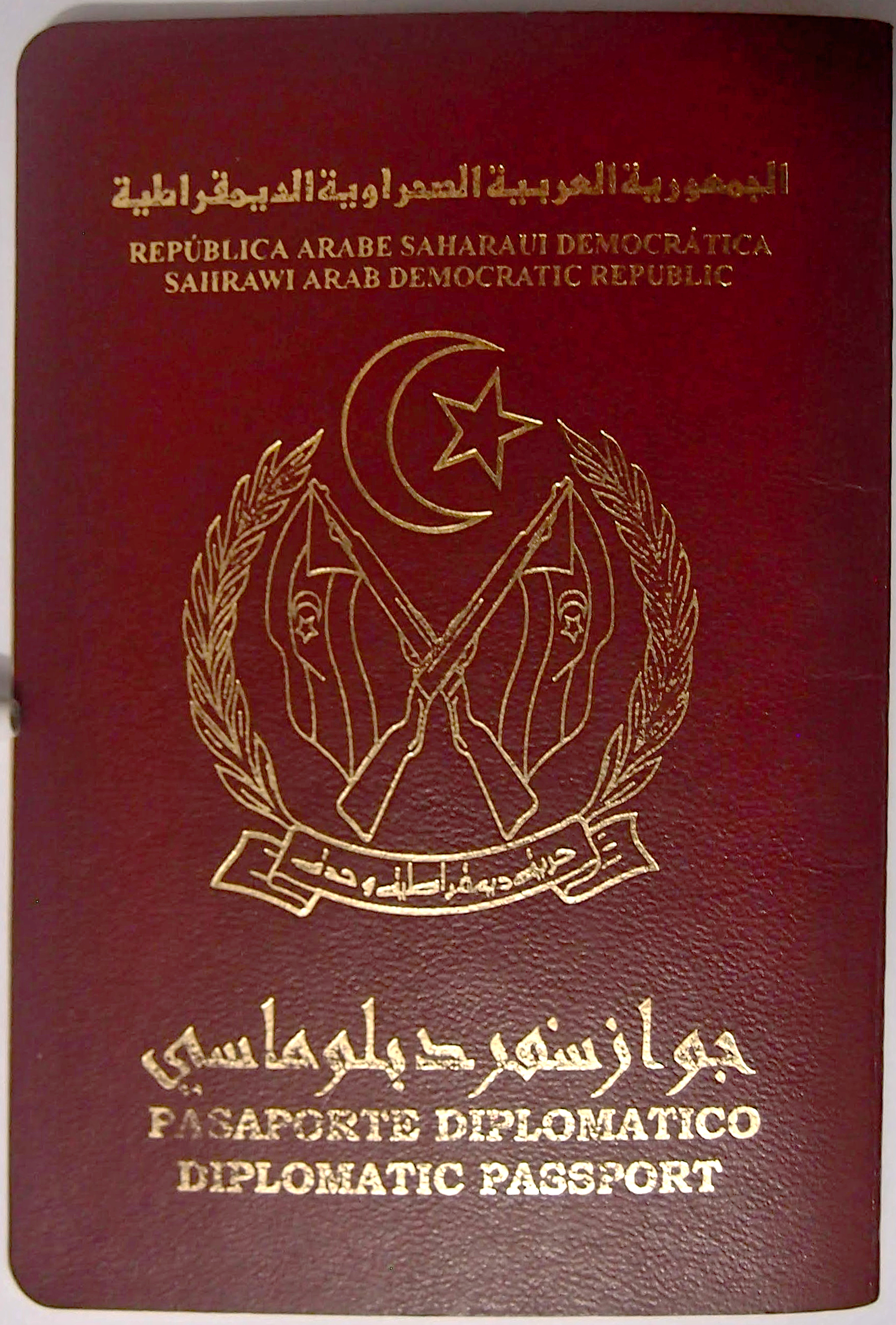
Western Sahara

== Types ==
- Biometric passport
- Internal passport
- International passport
- Machine-readable passport

=== Special passports ===
- Camouflage passport
- Fake passport
- Green Book (Tibetan document)
- Hajj passport
- Pet passport

==== Not granting a right of abode ====
Certain passports do not, without additional endorsement, confer the right of abode anywhere and have varying international acceptance for travel:

- (United Kingdom) British National (Overseas) passport - GBN is widely accepted for international travel
- (United Kingdom) British Subject passport - GBS is widely accepted for international travel
- Sovereign Military Order of Malta passport has very limited travel acceptance
- (Tonga) Tongan Protected Person passport has very limited travel acceptance

=== Travel documents issued to non-nationals ===
- 1951 Convention Travel Document
- 1954 Convention Travel Document
- Certificate of identity
- Interpol passport
- Laissez-passer (issued by the European Union and the United Nations)
- Nansen passport
- Travel document

=== Common design passport groups ===
- Andean passport
- CARICOM passport
- CEMAC passport
- Central America-4 passport
- ECOWAS passport
- Mercosul/Mercosur passport
- European Union passport
- Passports issued by EU candidate states
- Five Nations Passport Group

== See also ==
- Travel document
- Identity document
