= Indonesian passport =

Travel document issued to citizens of Indonesia

Indonesian passport; Paspor Indonesia
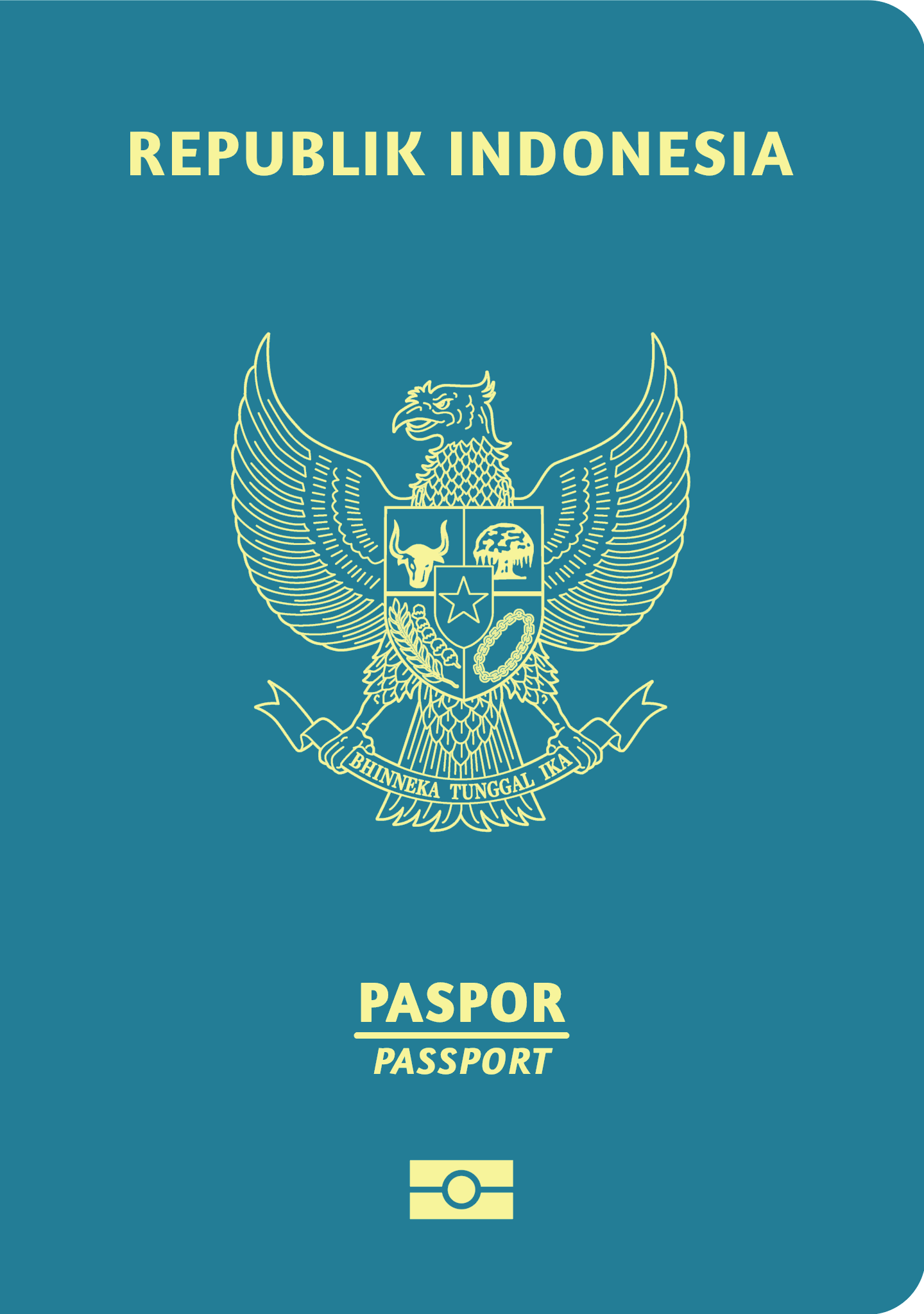
- The front cover of Indonesian passport with biometric passport (with chip)

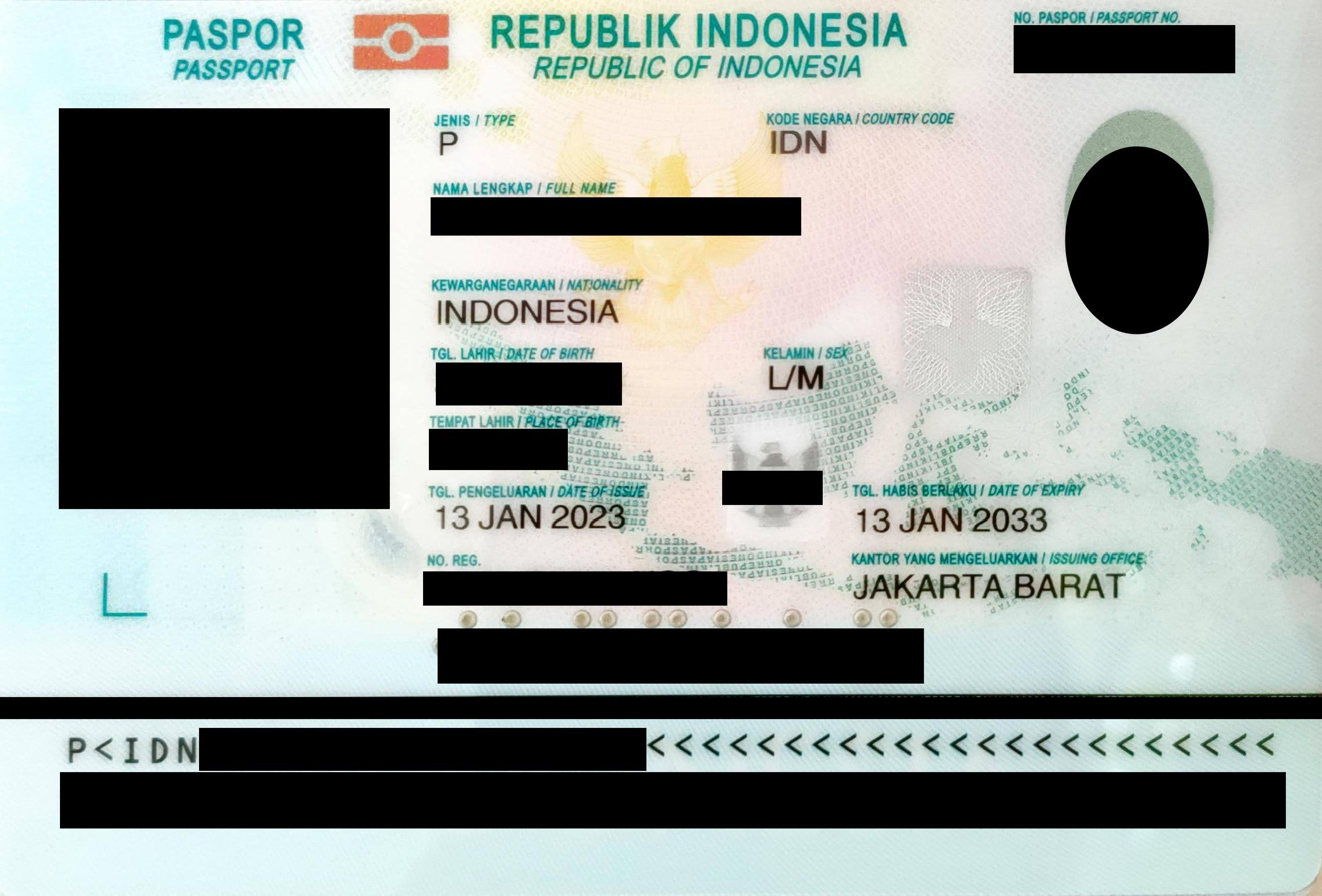
- The polycarbonate biodata page for the Indonesian biometric passport
- Type: Passport
- Issued by: Directorate General of Immigration
- First issued: 26 January 2011 (biometric passport); 30 October 2014 (latest version); 4 May 2023 (next-gen polycarbonate biometric passport)
- Purpose: Identification
- Eligibility: Indonesian citizenship
- Expiration: 10 years after acquisition (applicants age 17 and above or are married, residing or applying from within Indonesia); 5 years after acquisition (applicants below age 17 or residing in and applying from outside Indonesia); or if holder is a dual citizen may be adjusted accordingly to his/her 18th birthday and in some cases their 21st birthday for them to choose citizenship.
- Cost: Rp 950,000 for a 10-year e-passport (both laminate and polycarbonate versions); Rp 650,000 for a 5-year e-passport

An Indonesian passport (Indonesian: Paspor Indonesia) is a travel document issued by the Government of Indonesia to Indonesian citizens residing in Indonesia or overseas. The main governing body with regard to the issuance of such passport(s), possession(s), withdrawal and related matters is the Directorate General of Immigration under the Ministry of Immigration and Correction. Indonesia does not recognize multiple citizenship for its citizens and such citizens will automatically lose their Indonesian citizenship if another citizenship is acquired voluntarily. Special exceptions allow newly born citizens to hold dual nationalities (including Indonesian) until his/her eighteenth birthday after which a choice of either nationalities should be decided. The latest Indonesian passport has different national birds and sceneries on each page.

The latest version of the Indonesian passport was first announced on 30 October 2014. Visible revisions include:

1. Cover colour: Prior to 30 October 2014, ordinary Indonesian passports were issued with a dark green cover while the latest one is turquoise green (hijau toska).
2. Coat of arms: The coat of arms is now centered and significantly larger than older editions
3. Translation (cover only): Only 'passport' appears bilingually (Indonesian above and English below) while the phrase 'Republik Indonesia' is not translated to 'Republic of Indonesia'.

Starting from 12 October 2022, passports are now valid for 10 years.

== Types ==
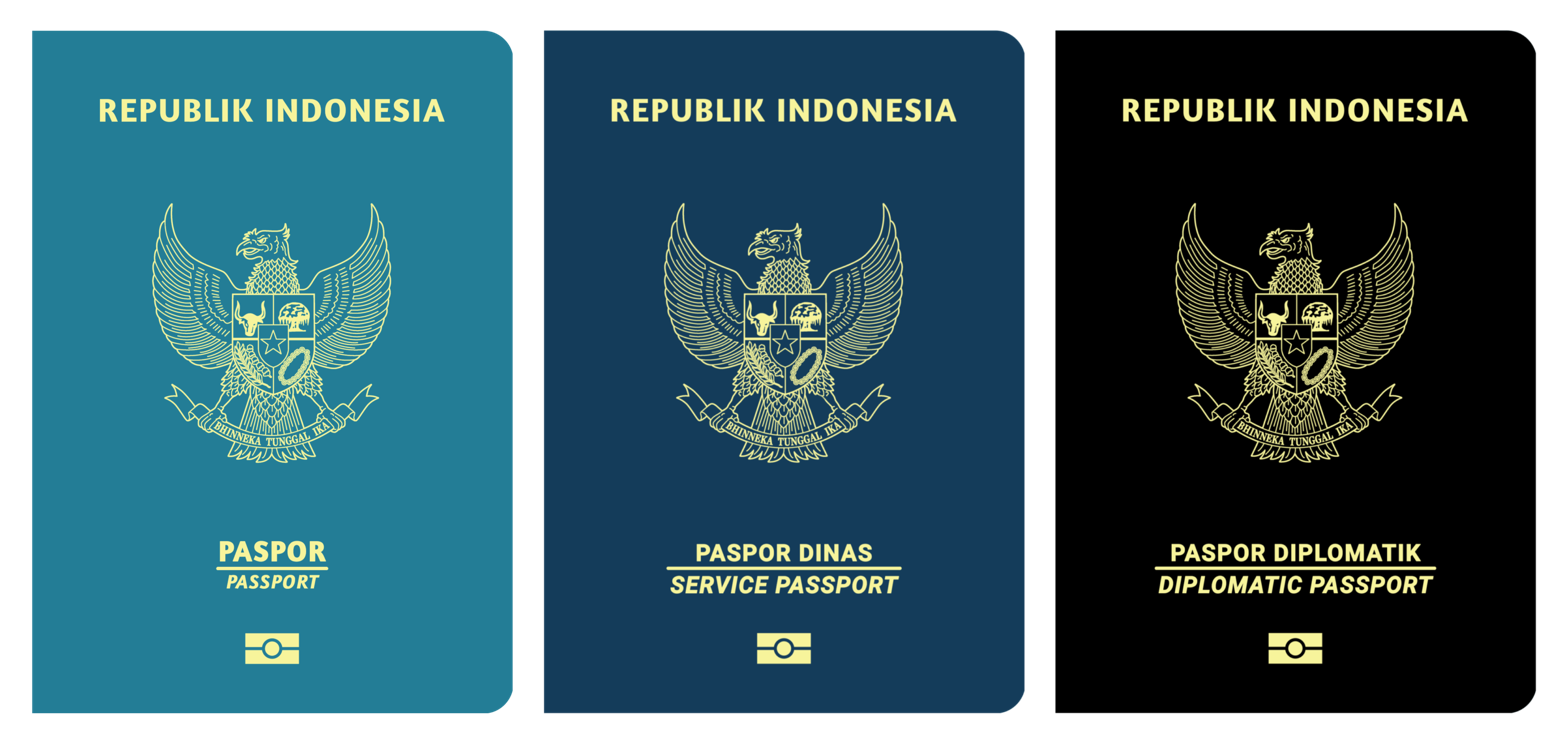
Left to right: ordinary (teal), official (navy blue), and diplomatic (black) passports of Indonesia.

=== Ordinary passports (obsolete) ===
According to Government Regulation No. 31/2013 (Peraturan Pemerintah Nomor 31 Tahun 2013), ordinary passports consist of electronic and non-electronic versions.

On 1 December 2024, the Directorate General of Immigration announced that it is phasing out the issuance of non-biometric passports nationwide, with a trial run started at 13 selected immigration offices in the major cities of Jakarta, Tangerang, Medan, Denpasar, Batam and Surabaya. As of May 2025, the phase-out of non-biometric ordinary passports will be expanded to the provinces of Indonesia, which starting 5 province in Sumatra.

=== Electronic passport ===
Effective from 26 January 2011, the Directorate General of Immigration introduced ordinary electronic passports (e-passport) for Indonesian citizens. The initial launch quota was set at 10,000 copies for the year 2011. Biometric passports were initially available only in three immigration offices: West Jakarta, Soekarno–Hatta, and Central Jakarta.

In 2011, approximately 12,000 Indonesian citizens obtained biometric passports and starting from the January 25, 2012, the Indonesian Immigration Authority launched computerized immigration gates at Soekarno–Hatta International Airport, reducing queue time for biometric passport holders as they no longer need to check in manually at the immigration counter. The service is available for both arriving and departing passengers. The government plans to install computerized gates in airports throughout the country.

As of early 2024, Indonesian e-passports can now be obtained in any local immigration office within Indonesia.. Indonesian e-passports can also be obtained at select embassies and consulates abroad.

Indonesian e-passport holders can enjoy visa-free travel to Japan for up to 15 days per stay (albeit still requiring a visa waiver endorsement certificate to be issued at a Japanese embassy / consulate or online prior to travel). Non-electronic passport holders do not enjoy this privilege and must apply for a visa whenever they want to travel to Japan.

Visa-free privileges of other countries for Indonesian passport holders are currently valid for both passport types.

According to Government Regulation No.28/2019, all Indonesian passports (both normal and biometric) now come with 48 pages. All types of Passports that only had 24 pages have been discontinued.

As of May 2023, there are two types of ordinary electronic passports; the first is an e-passport that has a laminate biodata sheet and has biometric chips embedded within the back cover of the passports, whereas the second is polycarbonate e-passport with the chip embedded in biometric data sheet page made of polycarbonate.

=== Diplomatic passports (Paspor diplomatik) ===
Issued by the Ministry of Foreign Affairs for Indonesian subject(s) who is serving as diplomat and/or government person in order to travel for diplomatic purpose(s). Such passport also covers the immediate family that would travel along with the main passport holder. Holding an Indonesian diplomatic passport does not guarantee a 'diplomatic immunity' to its bearer although those who gain 'diplomatic immunity' might be holding such passport. Holding such passport does not also entitle the bearer to travel with the passport for non-diplomatic mission. Appropriate 'non-diplomatic' visa or entry clearance should be obtained prior to travel to the destined country. The latest version of the Indonesian diplomatic passport is issued in a black colored-cover.

On 19 August 2021, the Ministry of Foreign Affairs launched a new version of the diplomatic e-passport, which complies with the Document 9303 ICAO standard.

=== Service passports (Paspor dinas) ===
Issued by Ministry of Foreign Affairs for Indonesian subject(s) who is serving as civil servant on official travel. This type of passport is also issued to the immediate family member of the main passport bearer. The latest version of the service passport is issued in a blue colored-cover.

On 19 August 2021, the Ministry of Foreign Affairs launched a new version of the service e-passport, which complies with the Document 9303 ICAO standard.

=== Hajj passports (obsolete) ===
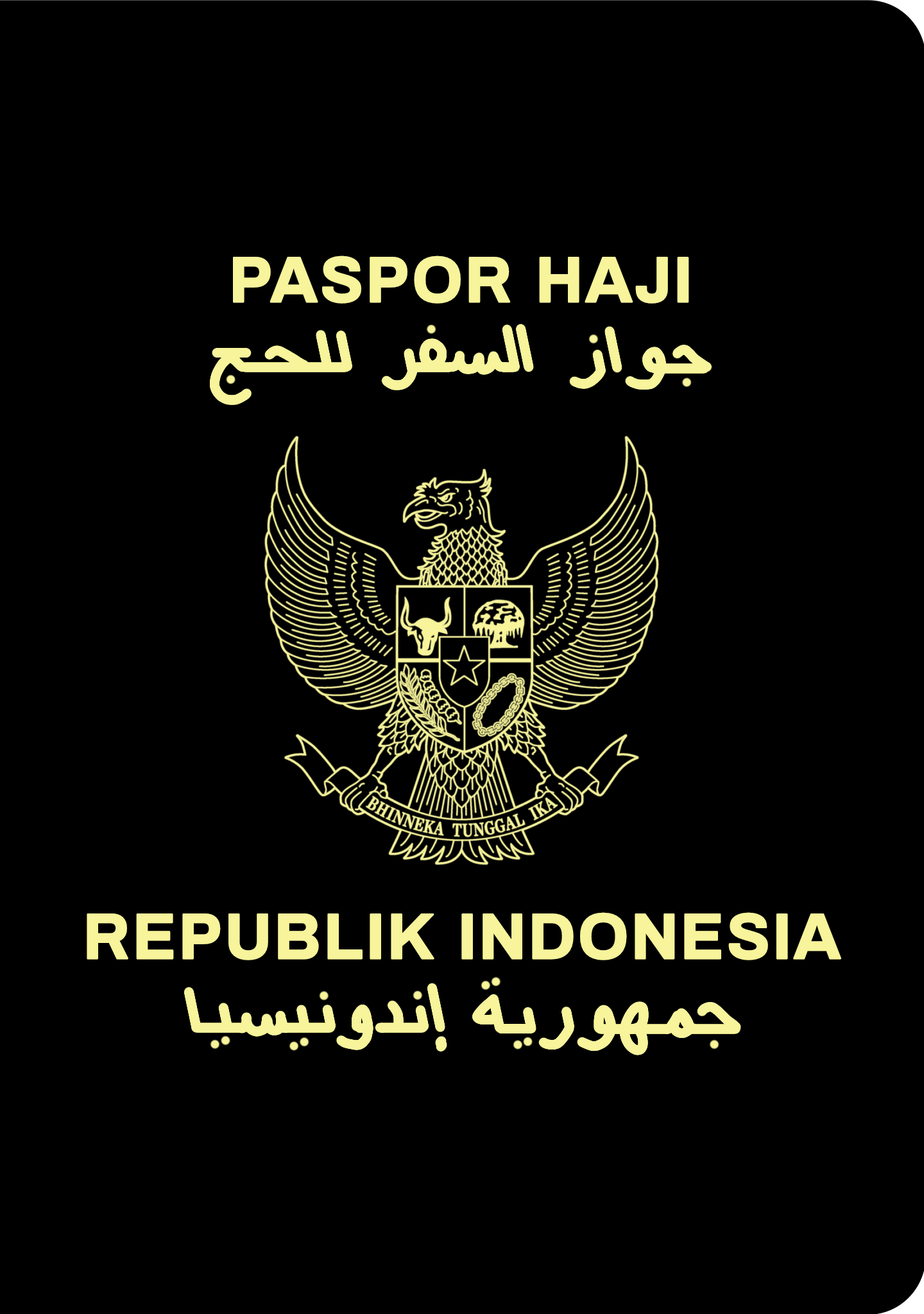
Indonesian hajj passport, no longer used since 2009

The Ministry of Religious Affairs formerly issued hajj passports for the hajj pilgrimage to Mecca under Article 29(1)(d) and Article 33 of the Immigration Act of 1992. However, new government regulations in 2009 deleted the relevant portions of the legislation. As of Hajj 2009, all hajj pilgrims from Indonesia use ordinary passports. The use of ordinary passports is a requirement of the Saudi Arabian government.

== History ==
The first Indonesian passport was issued in 1945. The cover of the Indonesian ordinary passport is only in Indonesian, but translations are also provided French and English inside the passport. This passport had a light gray cover. It had the portrait photo of the holder and a facial description as usual.

Diplomatic passports, meanwhile, were black in color. The cover is only in French with the text "Passeport Diplomatique" meaning "Diplomatic Passport". This passport did not have anything written in Indonesian, if not French and English.

In 1959, the cover color of Indonesian ordinary passports was changed to blue. Meanwhile, in diplomatic passports, French was replaced with Indonesian while keeping English, even though they retained the cover color of black. In 1968, following the beginning of the New Order era, French texts were removed from the passport; since then, the Indonesian passport have been strictly bilingual in Indonesian and English.

In 1983, the cover color was changed to green and now mentions the holder's profession outside its physical or facial description page.

Machine-readable Indonesian passports, which no longer include physical or facial descriptions, were first issued in 1995 and lacked physical characteristics, complying with ICAO standards. Not only that, the cover color was changed to dark green. By the mid-2000s, the machine-readable Indonesian passport was the sole model being issued.

The current model of the Indonesian passport had a turquoise cover and has been issued since 30 October 2014.

== Proposed passport redesign ==
Proposed red Indonesian passport redesign for 17 August 2025, before being postponed in 17 July 2025

The Directorate General of Immigration launched a new passport design on 17 August 2024, coinciding with the 79th Independence Day celebration. The cover will be changed to bright red (a national colour of Indonesia) with white letters. The newly designed passport was originally set to be issued starting from 17 August 2025, before the Directorate General of Immigration announced on 17 July 2025 that it is postponing the issuance of the new redesigned red passport with no confirmed release date, citing efficiency and austerity policies under the Prabowo administration.

== Passport Note ==
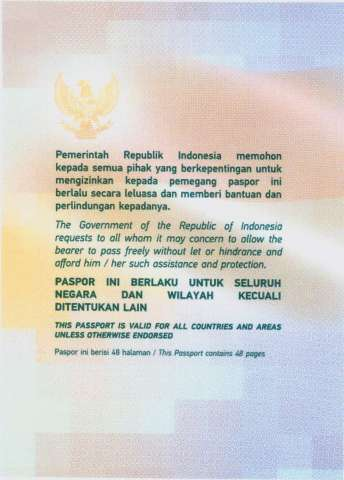
Interior cover and the first page of a contemporary Indonesian passport, on which the passport note from the government is depicted

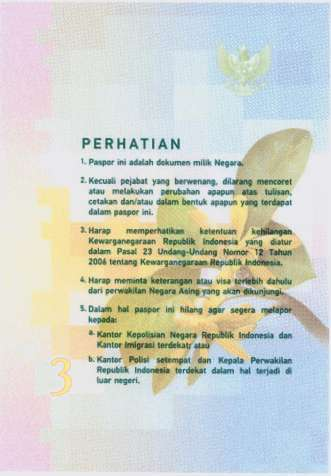
The latest version (2014) of Indonesian passport contains 'warning' on the third page, typically found on the interior back cover of its prior version.

The passports contain a note from the issuing state that is addressed to the authorities of all other states, identifying the bearer as a citizen of that state and requesting that he or she be allowed to pass and be treated according to international norms. The note is found on the first page of the passport, which is on the other side of the identity page. The note inside the latest version of Indonesian passports states:

In Indonesian:

Pemerintah Republik Indonesia memohon kepada semua pihak yang berkepentingan untuk mengizinkan kepada pemegang paspor ini berlalu secara leluasa dan memberikan bantuan dan perlindungan kepadanya.

Paspor ini berlaku untuk seluruh negara dan wilayah kecuali ditentukan lain

In English:

The Government of the Republic of Indonesia requests to all whom it may concern to allow the bearer to pass freely without let or hindrance and afford him/her such assistance and protection.

This passport is valid for all countries and areas unless otherwise endorsed

The English translation only makes sense if the phrase 'as may be necessary' follows 'protection' at the end of the sentence.

In case of diplomatic and service passports, those are not formally valid for visits to Israel and Taiwan, since there are no formal diplomatic ties with those countries, requiring diplomats and service personnels to use ordinary passports and to obtain appropriate visa or entry clearance from the immigration authority of the destined countries.

There is slight difference as appears on page number three, which is immediately next to the identity page, between the ordinary non-electronic passport and the electronic version. The ordinary non-electronic passport depicts signatures of both the bearer of the passport and the issuing authority; both are manually done at the immigration office during the interview by the immigration officer. Official later stamp of the corresponding issuing authority logo on the same page with the signatures.

The ordinary electronic passport no longer bears the signature or of the issuing authority as such information has been embedded in the digital information system. However, the signature of the bearer is still manually done during the interview by the immigration officer although digital signature of the holder is also included in the digital information embedded on the electronic chip along with the ten-fingerprints and digital face photograph. Above the signature, reminder of the inclusion of the chip on the passport can be found requesting appropriate treatment of the passport to avoid chip disturbance as such passport should not be bent and/or exposed to extreme radioactivity devices.

Third page of the latest (2014) version of Indonesian ordinary passport (both electronic and non-electronic versions) contains 'warning' (peringatan) that would typically be printed on the interior side of the back cover of its predecessor version.

== Absence of signature column in some passports ==
In 2019, the Directorate General of Immigration removed the bearer's signature column in both ordinary and electronic Indonesian passports for efficiency reasons. On 11 August 2022, the German Embassy in Jakarta announced that Indonesian passports without a signature column could not be processed for visa applications; citing inconsistency with international norms.

On 13 August 2022, the Directorate General of Immigration issued a statement saying that Indonesian passport holders who are affected by the problem could apply for an endorsement signature column in immigration offices and that they were communicating with the Indonesian Ministry of Foreign Affairs to discuss the issue with the German Embassy in Jakarta. However, the German Embassy initially stated that it did not recognize an endorsement as a valid replacement of the signature column and was therefore unable to accept passports with such endorsements for the processing of a visa application.

On 17 August 2022, the German Embassy in Jakarta announced that passports with the addition of an endorsement column by Indonesian immigration authorities can be processed for visa applications. The German Embassy also appealed to Indonesian passport holders who did not have a signature field and were undergoing the visa process to immediately validate their signatures on the endorsement page to the immigration authorities. The German Federal Ministry of Internal Affairs coordinated with the German Police at border checks so that Indonesian citizens with passports without a signature column can still travel if they already have a visa.

Starting from October 2022, all newly issued Indonesian passports include columns for the bearer's signature, while Indonesian polycarbonate biometric passports still do not include a signature column for the passport bearer. Indonesians that receive a new passport should check whether or not the signature column is present, and that passport holders who do not have a signature column should request for a signature column added on the endorsement page at the local immigration office or Indonesian diplomatic missions.

On 10 October 2022, the embassy of the Kingdom of the Netherlands in Jakarta also announced that the Netherlands (along with Belgium and Luxembourg) would only recognize Indonesian passports for visa applications if they contain a signature endorsement or a signature column.

== Identity information page ==
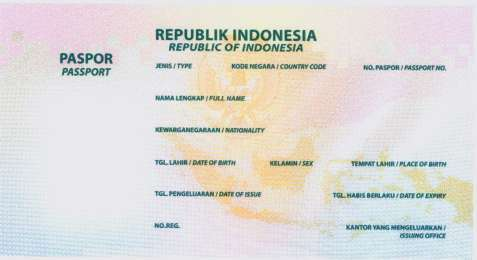
Page 2 of an ordinary Indonesian passport. The bearer's photograph is depicted on the left side, there are 2 holograms visible under UV light; a hologram of the national emblem on the top right and a big star in the center-right. The page is bilingual: Indonesian (first) then English (second).

Information listed:

- Photograph
- Type (jenis)
- Country code (kode negara)
- Passport number (nomor paspor)
- Full name (nama lengkap)
- Sex (kelamin)
- Nationality (kewarganegaraan)
- Date of birth (tanggal lahir)
- Place of birth (tempat lahir)
- Date of issue (tanggal pengeluaran)
- Date of expiry (tanggal habis berlaku)
- Issuing office (kantor yang mengeluarkan)
- Registration number (nomor registrasi)
- Machine readable zone

== Visa requirements map ==
Countries and territories with visa-free entries or visas on arrival for holders of regular Indonesian passports. Indonesia Visa not required eVisa or Visa on arrival eVisa Visa on arrival Visa required prior to arrival

Visa requirements for Indonesian citizens are administrative entry restrictions imposed on citizens of Indonesia by the authorities of other states. As of February 2026, Indonesian citizens have visa-free or visa on arrival access to 72 countries and territories, ranking the Indonesian passport 62nd in terms of travel freedom according to the Henley Passport Index.

As a member of ASEAN, Indonesian citizens enjoy visa-free access to other ASEAN member countries. Indonesian citizens carrying a biometric passport can also enjoy visa-free access to Japan for a maximum of 15 days after registering for a visa waiver online or in person.

== Passport fees ==
Effective 17 December 2024 per Government Regulation No. 45/2024, the Ministry of Law and Human Rights have raised the prices for Indonesian passports, while also introducing five-year and ten-year validity options for both ordinary and electronic biometric passports.

Passport type	Price in Indonesian rupiah
5-year electronic/electronic polycarbonate passport (48 pages)	Rp 650,000 (US$36)
10-year electronic/electronic polycarbonate passport (48 pages)	Rp 950,000 (US$52)

Payment can be made through banks (internet / mobile banking), ATMs (Bank Mandiri, BNI, BRI, and BCA), e-wallet (DANA), convenience stores (Indomaret), post office, and online e-commerce sites (Tokopedia and Bukalapak).

== See also ==
- Paspor Orang Asing
- Surat Perjalanan Laksana Paspor
- List of passports
- Visa requirements for Indonesian citizens
- Visa policy of Indonesia
