= SPLP =

SPLP may refer to:

- Surat Perjalanan Laksana Paspor, type of Indonesian travel document
- Las Palmas Air Base, Lima, Peru (ICAO abbreviation)
- Synthetic precipitation leaching procedure; see Leaching (Chemistry)
