= Surat Perjalanan Laksana Paspor =

The Surat Perjalanan Laksana Paspor (SPLP, "Travel Document in Lieu of a Passport") is an Indonesian travel document issued to persons who do not have other appropriate travel documents, for the purpose of proceeding to and from Indonesia. There are several categories of SPLPs, covering both Indonesian citizens and non-Indonesian citizens. Indonesia also issued a travel document known in English as an Alien Passport (Paspor Orang Asing), a two-year 24-page document which is separate from the SPLP.

== Issuance ==
At different times, various types of SPLPs have been authorised by Indonesian immigration and travel documents laws and regulations for both Indonesian citizens and non-Indonesian citizens.

1. Surat Perjalanan Laksana Paspor Untuk Warga Negara Indonesia ("Travel Document in Lieu of an Indonesian Citizen Passport" or "Indonesian SPLP"), a multiple-journey document issued to citizens of Indonesia.
2. Surat Perjalanan Laksana Paspor Dinas ("Travel Document in Lieu of an Official Passport" or "Official SPLP"), a single-journey document issued to government officials. Provision is no longer made for this type of SPLP since the 2011 Immigration Act.
3. Surat Perjalanan Laksana Paspor Untuk Orang Asing ("Travel Document in Lieu of an Alien Passport" or "Alien SPLP"), a single-journey document issued to aliens.
4. Surat Perjalanan Lintas Batas ("Cross-Border Travel Document" or "SPLB"), a multiple-journey document issued to Indonesian citizens living in border areas; it is classified as a kind of SPLP since 2011.

Indonesian SPLPs are often issued to Indonesians abroad who have not registered their stay abroad with the Indonesian consulate and have lost their original passports. They may also be issued in Indonesia in case stocks of blank Indonesian passports run low. They have sixteen pages and are valid for three years. In 2010, about 10,000 Indonesians staying in Malaysia without valid travel documents applied for SPLPs in order to return to Indonesia for Hari Raya Idul Fitri. The Indonesian Consulate General in Sabah states that their policy is to issue passports only to employed persons or those with guarantors; others receive SPLPs and are encouraged to leave the country to escape Malaysia's crackdowns on immigration violators.

Alien SPLPs have sixteen pages and are valid for one year. According to Indonesian missions abroad, alien SPLPs can be issued in two ways. First, they may be issued to foreigners in Indonesia who do not have any valid travel documents in order for them to depart Indonesia, and in this case are valid only for a one-way journey. Second, they may be issued to foreigners outside of Indonesia who do not have any valid travel documents to go to Indonesia, and in this case are valid for both legs of the journey to and from Indonesia. Issuance of an Alien SPLP requires proof that the holder can be readmitted to the country of departure. The Alien SPLP can be issued to individuals or families; the fee will be higher for the latter case.

Official SPLPs are issued to government officials to travel outside of Indonesia on official duty but do not qualify for an official passport, as well as to persons who have lost their official passports while outside of Indonesia. Like Alien SPLPs, Official SPLPs are valid only for one journey and a period of one year.

== Acceptance ==
As of 2007, amongst EU states, only Italy has stated that it officially recognises the Indonesian SPLP ("passport-like travel document for Indonesian citizens") for visa-issuance purposes; the Benelux countries, Spain, France, Slovenia, and Norway have explicitly indicated that they do not recognise it. Germany and Estonia indicated that they will accept SPLPs ("travel document in lieu of a passport") for exit purposes only to enable the holder to return to Indonesia. Other European Union countries did not provide the Council of the European Union's Visa Working Party with any information on their acceptance.

== Relevant laws and regulations ==
=== Prior ===
The 1950 Travel Documents Act in Article 1 authorised the issuance of "other travel documents" in general, but did not use the specific term SPLP. The 1959 Travel Documents Act specifically enumerated the SPLP in Article 1 as one of five types of travel documents of the Republic of Indonesia, and the only one which was not a passport. It did not distinguish between Indonesian, Alien, or Official SPLPs as did later acts; it simply stated in Article 4 that Indonesian citizens could obtain either regular passports or SPLPs, while aliens dwelling in Indonesia could obtain alien passports or SPLPs if they had no travel document from any other state or could not obtain one in a reasonable time. In both cases the SPLP could be issued for an individual or include the individual's wife and minor children (under 16) as well. There was no provision for Official SPLPs.

In the 1992 Immigration Act, the Indonesian SPLP, Alien SPLP, and Official SPLP are enumerated in Article 29 as three of a total of eight kinds of travel documents of the Republic of Indonesia. The issuance of the Alien SPLP was governed by Article 35, while no specific article governed the Indonesian SPLP or Official SPLP. Again, issuance of the Alien SPLP was only mentioned for the case of foreigners in Indonesia, not those outside of Indonesia. Government travel documents regulations issued in 1994 gave details about each type of SPLP: Indonesian SPLP in Articles 26 to 30, Alien SPLP in Articles 31 to 35, and Official SPLP in Articles 36 to 39. The regulations state that Alien SPLPs may be applied for either within the territory of Indonesia in order to depart from the country, or outside the territory of Indonesia in order to make a journey to Indonesia and then depart. The regulations required applicants for Alien SPLPs to have guarantors (penjamin) in Indonesia.

Prior to 1994, the SPLP had been issued in the form of a single-sheet letter, but from 1994 onward, the General Directorate of Immigration indicated in a public guidelines notice that it would be switching to a book-type format like a normal passport, due to forgery concerns. The notice listed some additional grounds for granting of an SPLP: Indonesian SPLPs would be issued to Indonesians living as illegal immigrants in other countries, as well as in the event of depletion of stocks of blank passports, while Alien SPLPs would be issued to former Indonesian citizens who had lost citizenship under Article 17(k) of Act No. 62 of 1958 and wanted to travel to Indonesia in order to regain Indonesian citizenship.

Regulations issued by the General Director of Immigration in November 2010 described the Alien SPLP as issued for the purpose of leaving and then returning to Indonesia, or entering once from outside the territory of Indonesia.

=== Current ===
The 2011 Immigration Act in Article 24 listed three types of passports (Diplomatic, Official, and Ordinary) and three types of SPLPs (Indonesian, Alien, and Border Pass). It did not mention Alien Passports nor Official SPLPs. Article 27 through 29 discussed SPLPs. Article 27 (like the 1992 Act's Article 35) did not mention the issuance of Alien SPLPs to people outside of Indonesia, and stated that the issuance of Alien SPLPs was restricted to foreigners whose countries lack diplomatic representation in Indonesia. Article 28 continued the practise of granting SPLPs either on an individual or collective basis. Article 29 discussed border passes. The Indonesian government has not yet issued travel document regulations in accord with the new Immigration Act.
