= Visa requirements for Indonesian citizens =

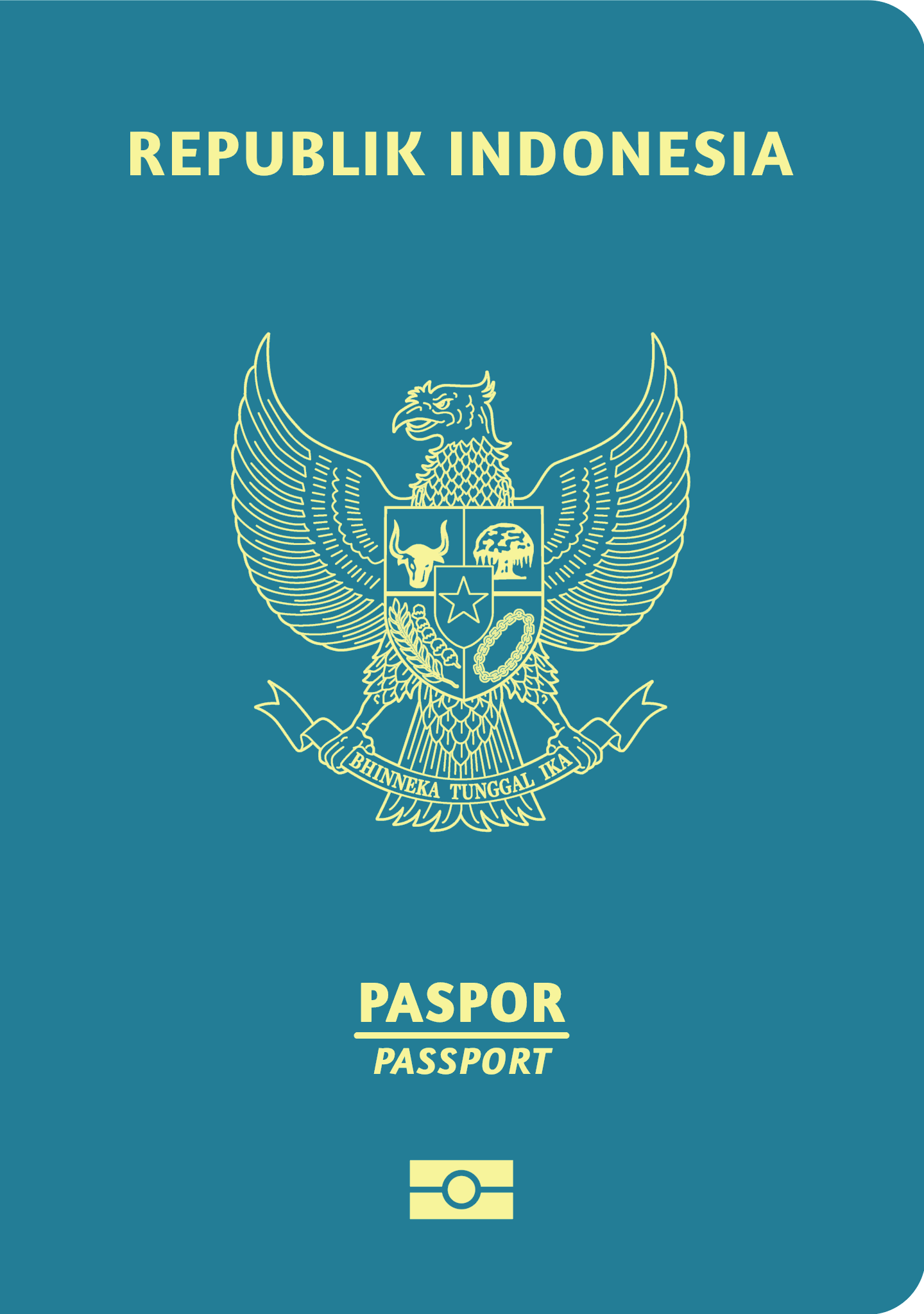
The cover of a biometric Indonesian passport

Visa requirements for Indonesian citizens are administrative entry restrictions imposed on citizens of Indonesia by the authorities of other states.

As of 2026, Indonesian citizens had visa-free or visa on arrival access to 70 countries and territories, ranking the Indonesian passport 63rd in the world according to the Henley Passport Index.

== Visa requirements map ==
Visa requirements for holders of Indonesian passport Indonesia Visa not required/Free ETA/ Free Visa on arrival Visa not required (conditional) Visa on arrival eVisa Visa available both on arrival or online Visa not required using substitute visa Visa available on arrival using substitute visa Visa required

== Visa requirements ==
| Country | Visa requirement | Allowed stay | Notes (excluding departure fees) |
|---|---|---|---|
| Afghanistan | eVisa (conditional) | 30 days | e-Visa : Visitors must arrive at Kabul International (KBL).; Visitors may apply for an e-Visa in other countries, excluding some countries of residence (include Indonesia).; As of November 2020, due to safety concerns, Indonesian government advises its citizens not to visit Afghanistan. |
| Albania | eVisa | 90 days | Nationals of Indonesia holding a valid, multiple-entry Schengen, UK, or US visa; A residence permit from a Schengen member state; or a 10-year residence permit of the UAE are permitted to enter Albania without a visa for 90 days. |
| Algeria | Visa required | | Persons may be denied entry if entering with a passport containing visas or stamps issued by Israel.; Visitors on tours organized to some southern regions by an approved travel agency may obtain a visa on arrival for up to 30 days. |
| Andorra | Visa required | | There are no visa requirements for entry into Andorra, but it can only be accessed by passing through France or Spain. A multiple-entry Schengen visa is required to re-enter either France or Spain when leaving Andorra. |
| Angola | Visa not required | 30 days | 30 days per trip, but no more than 90 days within any 1 calendar year for tourism purposes only.; Visitors must have a return/onward ticket and a hotel reservation confirmation.; An International Certificate of Vaccination is required. |
| Antigua and Barbuda | Visa not required | 30 days | A visa-exemption agreement was signed on 27 August 2021. |
| Argentina | Visa required | | A maximum of 90 days of stay per period. Electronic Travel Authorization (AVE) is available for holders of US B2 visa (with at least 3 months of validity left) at a fee of 50 USD, for a stay of up to 90 days. |
| Armenia | eVisa / Visa on arrival | 120 days | Visa on arrival is available for holders of a valid sticker visa or resident card issued by Australia, Canada, GCC countries, Japan, New Zealand, Russia, South Korea, EU or Schengen Area member states, United Kingdom or United States. |
| Australia | Visa required | | An Online Visitor visa can be obtained.; Transit visa is not required.; Australian visitor visa is granted up to 3 years for tourism purpose and up to 5 years for business purpose for nationals of Indonesia. |
| Austria | Visa required | | 90 days within any 180-day period in the Schengen Area.; Schengen Visa is now valid up to 5 years for nationals of Indonesia on second application. |
| Azerbaijan | eVisa / Visa on arrival | 30 days | e-Visa option is also available for Indonesian citizens for maximum stay of 30 days. |
| Bahamas | eVisa | 3 months | |
| Bahrain | eVisa / Visa on arrival | 14 days | e-Visa application required.; Only Nationals of Indonesia holding a Schengen, United Arab Emirates, United Kingdom, United States of America or Saudi Arabia visa (except Hajji/Umroh visa) are eligible to obtain visa on arrival. |
| Bangladesh | Visa on arrival | 30 days | |
| Barbados | Visa not required | 90 days | |
| Belarus | Visa not required / eVisa | 30 days | Indonesian citizens must arrive and depart via Minsk National Airport and are not on flights to or from Russia since these are regarded as the Union State internal flights with no border controls.; Indonesian citizens must also have plane tickets with confirmation of a departure date within 30 days and medical insurance in the amount of at least €10,000. |
| Belgium | Visa required | | 90 days within any 180-day period in the Schengen Area.; Schengen Visa is now valid up to 5 years for nationals of Indonesia on second application. |
| Belize | Visa required | | Visa requirement is waived for valid, multiple-entry Canada, US and Schengen visa holders. |
| Benin | eVisa | 30 days | Must have an international vaccination certificate.; Three types of electronic visa are offered: the e-Visa valid for 30 days for a single entry (50 EUR), the e-Visa valid for 30 days for several (multiple) entries (75 EUR), and the e-Visa valid for 90 days to make several (multiple) entries (100 EUR). |
| Bhutan | eVisa | 90 days | The Sustainable Development Fee (SDF) of 200 USD per person, per night for almost all visitors to Bhutan. Additionally, if payment is made in US dollars from September 1, 2023 to August 31, 2027, the SDF is 100 USD. |
| Bolivia | Visa required | | |
| Bosnia and Herzegovina | Visa required | | Visa requirement is waived for valid multiple-entry Schengen visa or residency permit holders, with a maximum of 15 days of stay. |
| Botswana | eVisa | 3 months | |
| Brazil | Visa not required | 30 days | |
| Brunei | Visa not required | 14 days | |
| Bulgaria | Visa required | | 90 days within any 180-day period in the Schengen Area.; Schengen Visa is now valid up to 5 years for nationals of Indonesia on second application. |
| Burkina Faso | eVisa | | |
| Burundi | Online Visa / Visa on arrival | 1 month | |
| Cambodia | Visa not required | 30 days | |
| Cameroon | eVisa | | |
| Canada | Visa required | | A Transit Without Visa (TWOV) is available if the Indonesian national holds a valid US visa, is traveling on an approved airline, and enters through an approved Canadian airport. However, nationals may not leave the airport during their stopover.; Canada Visitor Visa issued to nationals of Indonesia is valid up to 10 years or until the passport expiry whichever shorter.; Starting 26 May 2026, Indonesian visitors who have either held a Canadian visa in the last 10 years or who "currently hold a valid United States non-immigrant visa" can now apply for an eTA for up to 6 months instead of a visa when travelling to Canada by air. |
| Cape Verde | Visa required | | |
| Central African Republic | Visa required | | |
| Chad | eVisa | | |
| Chile | Visa not required | 60 days | Nationals of Indonesia are eligible to extend for additional 90 days for a total maximum stay of 150 days. |
| China | Visa required (conditional); Visa not required | | 240-hour (10-day) visa-free transit to a third country or region (including Hong Kong, Macau or Taiwan) using any mode of transport. Must have a confirmed onward ticket/itinerary, and enter through 1 of 64 approved ports.; During which, may freely travel within the 24 provinces permitted for visa-free transit and engage in tourism, business, and visits.; 24-hour visa-free transit to a third country or region (including Hong Kong, Macau, and Taiwan), is available at most international airports, without leaving the airport.; Travellers who need to leave the airport may obtain a temporary entry permit from immigration.; 5-day port visa (Visa on Arrival) for Shenzhen if arriving at designated ports of entry from Hong Kong by land or sea, for stays within Shenzhen.; 3-day port visa (Visa on Arrival) if arriving in Zhuhai or Xiamen at designated ports of entry, for stays within the respective city.; 15-day visa-free entry for cruise ship passengers in tour groups, if arriving at any cruise port along China's coastline, including but not limited to Tianjin; Dalian; Shanghai; Lianyungang; Wenzhou; Zhoushan; Xiamen; Qingdao; Guangzhou; Shenzhen; Beihai; Haikou; Sanya. May further travel inland to all regions of coastal provinces (and equivalents) and Beijing.; May apply for a port visa (Visa on Arrival) if travelling for an urgent, qualified reason. Prior clearance for port visa is highly recommended or may be denied boarding by airlines.; Visa not required when arriving and departing from Haikou Meilan International Airport, Hainan.; Passengers traveling as tourists can obtain a visa on arrival at Shenzhen Bao'an International Airport, Shenzen, for a maximum stay of 5 days. They must not leave Shenzhen during their stay. This is commonly done by entering Shenzhen from Hong Kong through the Lo Wu border crossing where VoA formalities are done. |
| Colombia | Visa not required | 90 days | Can be extended to a maximum of 180 days within a 1-year period. |
| Comoros | Visa on arrival | 45 days | |
| Republic of the Congo | Visa required | | |
| Democratic Republic of the Congo | eVisa | 7 days | |
| Costa Rica | Visa required | | Visa requirement is waived for US and Canada visa holders. |
| Côte d'Ivoire | eVisa | 3 months | e-Visa holders must enter through Félix-Houphouët-Boigny International Airport. |
| Croatia | Visa required | | 90 days within any 180-day period in the Schengen Area.; Schengen Visa is now valid up to 5 years for nationals of Indonesia on second application. |
| Cuba | eVisa | 90 days | |
| Cyprus | Visa required | | Nationals of Indonesia holding a valid, double or multiple-entry Schengen visa or a residence permit from a Schengen member state are permitted to enter Cyprus without a visa for 90 days within any 180-day period |
| Czech Republic | Visa required | | 90 days within any 180-day period in the Schengen Area.; Schengen Visa is now valid up to 5 years for nationals of Indonesia on second application. |
| Denmark | Visa required | | 90 days within any 180-day period in the Schengen Area.; Schengen Visa is now valid up to 5 years for nationals of Indonesia on second application. |
| Djibouti | eVisa | 90 days | |
| Dominica | Visa not required | 21 days | |
| Dominican Republic | Visa required | | Visa is not required for nationals of Indonesia holding Canada, Ireland, United States, United Kingdom or Schengen visa holders. |
| Ecuador | Visa not required | 90 days | Extendable stay.; Galapagos : A maximum of 60 days of stay; Visitors must pre-register to receive a 20 USD Transit Control Card (TCT). |
| Egypt | Visa required | | Passengers with a valid and used visa issued by Australia, Canada, Japan, New Zealand, USA, United Kingdom or a Schengen Member State can obtain a visa on arrival for a maximum stay of 30 days.; As of April 2024, due to safety concerns, Indonesian government advises its citizens not to visit Egypt. |
| El Salvador | Visa required | | |
| Equatorial Guinea | eVisa | | Required if travelling from a country with risk of yellow fever. |
| Eritrea | Visa required | | A maximum of 30 days of stay from the day of arrival.; Extendable at the Immigration Office in Asmara. |
| Estonia | Visa required | | 90 days within any 180-day period in the Schengen Area.; Schengen Visa is now valid up to 5 years for nationals of Indonesia on second application. |
| Eswatini | Visa required | | |
| Ethiopia | eVisa / Visa on arrival | 90 days | Visa on arrival is obtainable only at Addis Ababa Bole International Airport.; e-Visa holders must arrive via Addis Ababa Bole International Airport.; e-Visa is available for 30 or 90 days. |
| Fiji | Visa not required | 120 days | |
| Finland | Visa required | | 90 days within any 180-day period in the Schengen Area.; Schengen Visa is now valid up to 5 years for nationals of Indonesia on second application. |
| France | Visa required | | 90 days within any 180-day period in the Schengen Area.; Schengen Visa is now valid up to 5 years for nationals of Indonesia on second application. |
| Gabon | eVisa | 90 days | e-Visa holders must arrive through Libreville International Airport. |
| Gambia | Visa required | | |
| Georgia | eVisa | 30 days | An e-Visa will be valid for 120 days with the right to stay in Georgia up to 30 days during the validity period.; Visa may be substituted with a valid visa or residence permit issued by USA, UK, Japan, Canada, Australia, New Zealand, Israel, South Korea, Schengen, and GCC countries, whose holders may be granted visa-free entry for 90 days in any 180 days. The visa and other documentation must be presented at the border. |
| Germany | Visa required | | 90 days within any 180-day period in the Schengen Area.; Schengen Visa is now valid up to 5 years for nationals of Indonesia on second application. |
| Ghana | Visa required | | Visa on arrival or an emergency entry visa may be obtained. |
| Greece | Visa required | | 90 days within any 180-day period in the Schengen Area.; Schengen Visa is now valid up to 5 years for nationals of Indonesia on second application. |
| Grenada | Visa required | | |
| Guatemala | Visa required | | |
| Guinea | eVisa | 90 days | |
| Guinea-Bissau | Visa on arrival | 90 days | |
| Guyana | eVisa | | |
| Haiti | Visa not required | 90 days | |
| Honduras | Visa required | | |
| Hungary | Visa required | | 90 days within any 180-day period in the Schengen Area.; Schengen Visa is now valid up to 5 years for nationals of Indonesia on second application. |
| Iceland | Visa required | | 90 days within any 180-day period in the Schengen Area.; Schengen Visa is now valid up to 5 years for nationals of Indonesia on second application. |
| India | Free eVisa | 90 days | e-Visa holders must arrive via 32 designated airports (Note: Ahmedabad; Amritsar; Bagdogra; Bengaluru; Bhubaneswar; Chandigarh; Chennai; Coimbatore; Delhi; Gaya; Goa-Dabolim; Goa-Manohar; Guwahati; Hyderabad; Indore; Jaipur; Kannur; Kochi; Kolkata; Kozhikode; Lucknow; Madurai; Mangaluru; Mumbai; Nagpur; Port Blair; Pune; Surat; Thiruvananthapuram; Tiruchirappalli; Varanasi; Visakhapatnam) or 5 designated seaports. (Note: Chennai; Cochin; Mormugao (Goa); Mumbai; Mangalore); An Indian e-Tourist Visa may only be obtained twice within 1 calendar year.; Foreigners of Pakistani origin or who hold a Pakistani Passport are not eligible for an e-Visa. Foreigners who are not Pakistani nationals, but whose parents or grandparents (either paternal or maternal) were born in, or were permanent residents in Pakistan, are also not eligible for an e-Visa.; e-Visa is issued free of charge with validity up to 5 years for nationals of Indonesia. |
| Iran | Visa not required | 15 days | Maximum stay of 15 days within any 180-day period as a tourist.; As of April 2024, due to safety concerns, Indonesian government advises its citizens not to visit Iran. |
| Iraq | eVisa | 30 days | As of April 2024, due to safety concerns, Indonesian government advises its citizens not to visit Iraq. |
| Ireland | Visa required | | Visa is issued free of charge for nationals of Indonesia.; Nationals of Indonesia with a valid UK standard visitor visa, if they have first entered the United Kingdom and been granted a stay of 180 days in the United Kingdom, are visa exempt for a maximum stay of 90 days in Ireland (Rep.) or until the end of the period of stay granted in the United Kingdom, whichever is shorter. Not applicable to short-stay visas issued for the purpose of transit, marriage or to enter into a civil partnership, and to long-term student visas. |
| Israel | Visa required | | Confirmation from Israeli Foreign Ministry is required before a visa is issued.; As of April 2024, due to safety concerns, Indonesian government advises its citizens not to visit Israel. |
| Italy | Visa required | | 90 days within any 180-day period in the Schengen Area.; Schengen Visa is now valid up to 5 years for nationals of Indonesia on second application. |
| Jamaica | Visa required | | |
| Japan | Visa not required (conditional) | 15 days | Visa exemption is valid only if registered either through Japanese consulates or through the JAVES online portal. |
| Jordan | eVisa / Visa on arrival | 30 days | Visa can be obtained upon arrival, at a fee of 40 JOD.; The visa is obtainable at most international ports of entry and land border crossings, except Allenby Bridge.; As of April 2024, due to safety concerns, Indonesian government advises its citizens not to visit Jordan. |
| Kazakhstan | Visa not required | 30 days | |
| Kenya | Electronic Travel Authorization | 90 days | Applications can be submitted up to 90 days prior to travel and must be submitted at least 3 days in advance.; eTA fee is 32.50 USD.; Proof of reservation at the hotel where visitors plan to stay is required (if staying with friends, an invitation letter is also acceptable).; Yellow fever vaccination certificate is required if coming from endemic countries. |
| Kiribati | Visa not required | 90 days | 90 days within any 12-month period. |
| North Korea | Visa required | | |
| South Korea | Visa required | | Visa not required for a maximum stay of 30 days if the traveler: Holds a visa issued by Australia, Canada, USA or New Zealand, and only if they transit from or to those countries via South Korea.; Arrives and departs from Jeju International Airport, Jeju Island, for tourism purposes.; Group tourists can only travel to the Gangwon-do region and the metropolitan area of South Korea, and the maximum stay is 15 days.; Starting 28 May 2026 until December 2026, group travelers of 3 persons or more can enter South Korea without visa for maximum stay of 15 days if: Travelers' names previously registered by travel agents authorized by the South Korean government, reviewed and accepted by South Korean Ministry of Justice, and; The travelers enter and depart South Korea through the same flight or ship booking. |
| Kuwait | Visa required | | |
| Kyrgyzstan | eVisa / Visa on arrival | 60 days | Visa on arrival or e-Visa is for every types of passport.; Visa on arrival is available at Manas International Airport.; e-Visa holders must arrive via Manas International Airport or Osh Airport or through land crossings with China (at Irkeshtam or Torugart), Kazakhstan (at Ak-jol, Ak-Tilek, Chaldybar, or Chon-Kapka), Tajikistan (at Bor-Dobo, Kulundu, or Kyzyl-Bel), or Uzbekistan (at Dostuk). |
| Laos | Visa not required | 30 days | |
| Latvia | Visa required | | 90 days within any 180-day period in the Schengen Area.; Schengen Visa is now valid up to 5 years for nationals of Indonesia on second application. |
| Lebanon | Visa required | | In addition to a visa, an approval should be obtained from the immigration department of the General Directorate of General Security.; As of April 2024, due to safety concerns, Indonesian government advises its citizens not to visit Lebanon. |
| Lesotho | Visa required | | |
| Liberia | e-VOA | 3 months | |
| Libya | eVisa | | As of March 2015, due to safety concerns, Indonesian government advises its citizens not to visit Libya. |
| Liechtenstein | Visa required | | 90 days within any 180-day period in the Schengen Area.; Schengen Visa is now valid up to 5 years for nationals of Indonesia on second application. |
| Lithuania | Visa required | | 90 days within any 180-day period in the Schengen Area.; Schengen Visa is now valid up to 5 years for nationals of Indonesia on second application. |
| Luxembourg | Visa required | | 90 days within any 180-day period in the Schengen Area.; Schengen Visa is now valid up to 5 years for nationals of Indonesia on second application. |
| Madagascar | eVisa / Visa on arrival | 90 days | For stays of 61 to 90 days, the visa fee is 59 USD. |
| Malawi | eVisa / Visa on arrival | 90 days | |
| Malaysia | Visa not required | 30 days | |
| Maldives | Free visa on arrival | 30 days | |
| Mali | Visa not required | 30 days | |
| Malta | Visa required | | 90 days within any 180-day period in the Schengen Area.; Schengen Visa is now valid up to 5 years for nationals of Indonesia on second application. |
| Marshall Islands | Visa on arrival | 90 days | |
| Mauritania | eVisa | 30 days | |
| Mauritius | Visa on arrival | 60 days | |
| Mexico | Visa required | | Visa requirement is waived for valid US, Canada, Japan, UK or Schengen visa holders. |
| Micronesia | Visa not required | 30 days | |
| Moldova | Visa required | | A letter of invitation is required.; Citizens holding a residence permit or a valid visa issued by one of the member states of the European Union or one of the parties to the Schengen Agreement can apply for an e-Visa without an invitation. |
| Monaco | Visa required | | There are no visa requirements for entry into Monaco, but it can only be accessed by passing through France or Mediterranean sea. A multiple-entry Schengen visa is required to re-enter either France when leaving Monaco. |
| Mongolia | eVisa | 30 days | |
| Montenegro | Visa required | | Holders of travel documents containing a valid Schengen visa, a valid visa of the United States of America, United Kingdom, Ireland, as well as residence permits from those countries, may enter and stay in, or transit through, the territory of Montenegro for up to 30 days, but no longer than the expiration of their visa if the validity period is shorter than 30 days. |
| Morocco | Visa not required | 90 days | |
| Mozambique | Electronic Travel Authorization | 30 days | Visitors must register their ETA on the e-Visa platform at least 48 hours before travel and pay a processing fee of 48 USD. |
| Myanmar | Visa not required | 14 days | |
| Namibia | Visa not required | 90 days | |
| Nauru | Visa required | | |
| Nepal | Online Visa / Visa on arrival | 90 days | |
| Netherlands | Visa required | | 90 days within any 180-day period in the Schengen Area.; Schengen Visa is now valid up to 5 years for nationals of Indonesia on second application. |
| New Zealand | Visa required | | May transit without visa if transit is through Auckland Airport and for no longer than 24 hours, subject to meeting character requirements and obtaining an Electronic Travel Authority prior to departure.; Holders of an Australian Permanent Resident Visa or Resident Return Visa may be granted a New Zealand Resident Visa on arrival permitting indefinite stay (pursuant to the Trans-Tasman Travel Arrangement), subject to meeting character requirements and obtaining an Electronic Travel Authority prior to departure. |
| Nicaragua | Visa required | | |
| Niger | Visa required | | |
| Nigeria | eVisa | 30 days | |
| North Macedonia | Visa required | | Visa is not needed for holders of a multiple-entry Schengen visa (type C) valid for at least 5 (five) days beyond the intended stay in the Republic of North Macedonia, or for holders of permanent residence in an EU Member State or a country signatory to the Schengen Agreement. Eligible individuals may stay no longer than 15 (fifteen) days upon every entry into the territory of the Republic of North Macedonia as long as the total length of stay does not exceed 90 days in any 180-day period. |
| Norway | Visa required | | 90 days within any 180-day period in the Schengen Area.; Schengen Visa is now valid up to 5 years for nationals of Indonesia on second application. |
| Oman | Visa not required / eVisa | 14 days / 30 days | |
| Pakistan | eVisa | 3 months | |
| Palau | Free visa on arrival | 30 days | |
| Panama | Visa required | | Visa requirement is waived for multiple-entry, 1 year valid USA, Australia, Canada or UK visa holders. Schengen visa holders are also included in this category. |
| Papua New Guinea | Easy Visitor Permit / Visa on arrival | 60 days | Available at Gurney Airport, Mount Hagen Airport, Port Moresby Airport and Tokua Airport. |
| Paraguay | Visa on arrival | 30 days | |
| Peru | Visa not required | 90 days | |
| Philippines | Visa not required | 30 days | A single or multiple entry eVisa for stays of up to 59 days is also available. |
| Poland | Visa required | | 90 days within any 180-day period in the Schengen Area.; Schengen Visa is now valid up to 5 years for nationals of Indonesia on second application. |
| Portugal | Visa required | | 90 days within any 180-day period in the Schengen Area.; Schengen Visa is now valid up to 5 years for nationals of Indonesia on second application. |
| Qatar | Visa not required | 30 days | |
| Romania | Visa required | | 90 days within any 180-day period in the Schengen Area.; Schengen Visa is now valid up to 5 years for nationals of Indonesia on second application. |
| Russia | eVisa | 30 days | 72-hour visa-free visit to St. Petersburg, if travelling using St. Peter Line. |
| Rwanda | Visa not required | 90 days | |
| Saint Kitts and Nevis | Electronic Travel Authorisation | 90 days | |
| Saint Lucia | Visa required | | |
| Saint Vincent and the Grenadines | Visa not required | 3 months | |
| Samoa | Entry permit on arrival | 90 days | |
| San Marino | Visa required | | Only accessible via Italy, therefore a Schengen visa is required, |
| São Tomé and Príncipe | eVisa | | |
| Saudi Arabia | Visa required | | Passengers and first-degree family members of passengers with a tourist or business visa issued by USA, United Kingdom, or a Schengen Member State traveling as tourists can obtain a visa on arrival for a maximum stay of 90 days. The visa must have been used at least once and should have an entry stamp of the issuing country. Passengers are allowed a total stay of 90 days within a period of 12 months.; Travellers holding Umroh Visa can now travel outside Medina and Mekkah for tourism purposes. |
| Senegal | Visa required | | |
| Serbia | Visa not required | 30 days | 30 days within period of 1 year. |
| Seychelles | Electronic Border System | 3 months | Application can be submitted up to 30 days before travel.; Visitors must upload a reservation confirmation(s) for each visitor's location of stay in Seychelles.; Yellow fever vaccination certificate is required if coming from endemic countries.; Payment of the fee (EUR 10) by credit or debit card.; Valid for one journey only and it expires once exit the country. |
| Sierra Leone | eVisa / Visa on arrival | 3 months / 30 days | |
| Singapore | Visa not required | 30 days | |
| Slovakia | Visa required | | 90 days within any 180-day period in the Schengen Area.; Schengen Visa is now valid up to 5 years for nationals of Indonesia on second application. |
| Slovenia | Visa required | | 90 days within any 180-day period in the Schengen Area.; Schengen Visa is now valid up to 5 years for nationals of Indonesia on second application. |
| Solomon Islands | Visa required | | |
| Somalia | eVisa | 30 days | |
| South Africa | Electronic Travel Authorisation | 90 days | Indonesian passport holders may apply for instant South African electronic travel authorisation (ETA), provided the entry is via O.R. Tambo International Airport, Cape Town International Airport or Lanseria International Airport. |
| South Sudan | eVisa | | Obtainable online 30 days single entry for 100 USD, 90 days multiple entry for 200 USD and 180 days multiple entry for 350 USD.; Printed visa authorization must be presented at the time of travel. |
| Spain | Visa required | | 90 days within any 180-day period in the Schengen Area.; Schengen Visa is now valid up to 5 years for nationals of Indonesia on second application. |
| Sri Lanka | Free ETA/Free Visa on arrival | 30 days | ETA is issued free of charge for nationals of Indonesia. |
| Sudan | Visa required | | |
| Suriname | Visa not required | 90 days | An entrance fee of USD 50 or EUR 50 must be paid online prior to arrival.; Multiple entry e-Visa is also available. |
| Sweden | Visa required | | 90 days within any 180-day period in the Schengen Area.; Schengen Visa is now valid up to 5 years for nationals of Indonesia on second application. |
| Switzerland | Visa required | | 90 days within any 180-day period in the Schengen Area.; Schengen Visa is now valid up to 5 years for nationals of Indonesia on second application. |
| Syria | eVisa | | As of April 2024, due to safety concerns, Indonesian government advises its citizens not to visit Syria. |
| Tajikistan | Visa not required / eVisa | 30 days / 60 days | 60 days with e-Visa.; Visitors to the GBAO (Gorno-Badakhshan Autonomous Oblast) must obtain special permission. This can be applied for through the e-Visa website. |
| Tanzania | eVisa / Visa on arrival | 90 days | |
| Thailand | Visa not required | 60 days | |
| Timor-Leste | Visa not required | 30 days | Extendable once. |
| Togo | eVisa | 15 days | |
| Tonga | Visa required | | |
| Trinidad and Tobago | eVisa | | |
| Tunisia | Visa not required | 30 days | |
| Turkey | Visa not required | 30 days | 30 days per entry. A maximum of 90 days of stay within a 180-day period. |
| Turkmenistan | Visa required | | 10-day visa on arrival if holding a letter of invitation provided by a company registered in Turkmenistan with a prior approval from the Foreign Ministry. Visitors can apply to extend their stay for an additional 10 days.; When transiting between two non-bordering countries, visitors can obtain a Turkmenistan transit visa for a five-day stay. This must be applied for in advance at the Turkmenistan Embassy. Visitors must also submit copies of the visas for the country of entry into Turkmenistan and the country of departure from Turkmenistan. Visa fee is 20 USD. |
| Tuvalu | Visa on arrival | 1 month | |
| Uganda | eVisa | 3 months | Can also be entered on an East Africa Tourist Visa issued by Kenya or Rwanda. |
| Ukraine | eVisa | 30 days | Agreement on mutual visa abolishment (30 days) was approved on 18 November 2020. Visa exemption (30 days) agreement was signed in Kyiv, Ukraine on 29 June 2022.; This have not yet to be ratified. |
| United Arab Emirates | Visa required | | May apply using 'Smart service'.; Visa on arrival available for Indonesian ordinary passport holders that hold valid residence permit issued by USA, EU Member States, United Kingdom, Australia, Japan, Singapore, South Korea, Canada, or New Zealand. |
| United Kingdom | Visa required | | 24-hour visa-free transit: when in transit to/from Australia, Canada, New Zealand or USA, or if holder of residence permit issued by Australia, Canada, New Zealand or USA, or if holder of certain EEA or Switzerland visas, or if holder of certain Irish visas. |
| United States | Visa required | | B1/B2 visa issued to nationals of Indonesia is valid up to 5 years |
| Uruguay | Visa required | | No visa applications are considered further notice, this is yet to be confirmed whether it applies to every nationals that need a visa |
| Uzbekistan | Visa not required | 30 days | |
| Vanuatu | eVisa | 120 days | |
| Vatican City | Visa required | | Only accessible via Italy, therefore a Schengen visa is required. |
| Venezuela | Visa not required | 90 days | |
| Vietnam | Visa not required | 14 days | 90 days e-Visa also available. |
| Yemen | Visa required | | Separately, Yemen introduced an e-Visa system for visitors who meet certain eligibility requirements (group travel of 10 or more people, business trips, and transit etc.).; As of April 2024, due to safety concerns, Indonesian government advises its citizens not to visit Yemen. |
| Zambia | eVisa | 90 days | |
| Zimbabwe | eVisa / Visa on arrival | 1 month | |

=== Unrecognized or partially recognized countries ===
| Countries | Conditions of access | Notes |
|---|---|---|
| Abkhazia | Visa required | Tourists from all countries (except Georgia) can visit Abkhazia for a period not exceeding 24 hours as part of an organized tourist group. |
| Kosovo | Visa required | No visa needed for holders of a multi-entry Schengen visa, or a biometric valid residency permit from a Schengen member states. |
| Northern Cyprus | Visa not required | |
| Palestine | Visa not required | |
| South Ossetia | Visa required | To enter South Ossetia, visitors must have a multiple-entry visa for Russia and register their stay with the Migration Service of the Ministry of Internal Affairs within 3 days. |
| Taiwan (Republic of China) | Visa required | Online Application for Travel Authorization Certificate (TAC) available for Indonesian passport holders if: holding visa/residence permit/permanent residence certificate issued by USA/Canada/South Korea/UK/Schengen Convention countries, which may be valid or has expired less than 10 years prior to the date of arrival; holding electronic visa issued by Australia/New Zealand, that is still valid by the date of arrival; holding Japanese visa/visa waiver together with proof of record of entering Japan or confirmed onward ticket to Japan; holding South Korean visa together with proof of record of entering South Korea.; holding visa/residence permit issued by Taiwan (ROC) which has expired less than 10 years prior to the date of arrival; holders of entry visas bearing the remark FL (migrant worker), X (others), or P with "Special permission from MOFA" (visa and eVisa for "Project for Simplifying Visa Regulations for High-end Group Tourists from Southeast Asian Countries (Project Kuan-Hong)" ever issued), as well as holders of Taiwan (ROC) resident cards with stated purpose of residence being migrant worker (移工), are not eligible for a TAC |
| Transnistria | Visa not required | |

=== Dependent and autonomous territories ===
| Countries | Conditions of access | Notes |
United Kingdom
| Anguilla | eVisa | |
| Ascension Island | eVisa | 3 months within any year. |
| Bermuda | Visa required | |
| British Virgin Islands | Visa required | |
| British Indian Ocean Territory | Visa required | Those visiting the Territory must have prior approval. Visiting yachts to the Outer Islands require a permit before arrival. |
| Cayman Islands | Visa required | |
| Falkland Islands | Visa required | |
| Gibraltar | Visa required | Visa requirement is waived for holders of Schengen family residency permits |
| Guernsey | Visa required | |
| Isle of Man | Visa required | |
| Jersey | Visa required | |
| Montserrat | eVisa | Visa may be obtained online. |
| Saint Helena | eVisa | |
| Turks and Caicos | Visa required | |
| Tristan da Cunha | Prior permission of the island Council required | |
| Pitcairn Islands | Visa not required | |
China
| (China) Hainan | Visa not required | 30 days |
| Hong Kong | Visa not required | 30 days |
| Macau | Visa not required | 30 days |
Denmark
| Faroe Islands | Visa required | |
| Greenland | Visa required | |
Netherlands
| Aruba | Visa required | Visa requirement is waived for holders of Schengen residency permits |
| Caribbean Netherlands | Visa required | Includes Bonaire, Sint Eustatius and Saba Visa requirement is waived for holders of Schengen residency permits |
| Curaçao | Visa required | Visa requirement is waived for holders of Schengen residency permits |
| Sint Maarten | Visa required | Visa requirement is waived for holders of Schengen residency permits |
France
| French Guiana | Visa required | No visa required for holders of a permanent residency of France or one of the Schengen signatory states. Per July 2026, it also applies to Indonesian nationals holding French multiple-entry visa with validy between 6 months to 5 years. |
| French Polynesia | Visa required | No visa required for holders of a permanent residency of France or one of the Schengen signatory states. Per July 2026, it also applies to Indonesian nationals holding French multiple-entry visa with validy between 6 months to 5 years. |
| (France) French West Indies | Visa required | No visa required for holders of a permanent residency of France or one of the Schengen signatory states. includes overseas departments of Guadeloupe and Martinique and overseas collectivities of Saint Martin and Saint Barthélemy Per July 2026, it also applies to Indonesian nationals holding French multiple-entry visa with validy between 6 months to 5 years. |
| Mayotte | Visa required | No visa required for holders of a permanent residency of France or one of the Schengen signatory states. Per July 2026, it also applies to Indonesian nationals holding French multiple-entry visa with validy between 6 months to 5 years. |
| New Caledonia | Visa required | No visa required for holders of a permanent residency of France or one of the Schengen signatory states. Per July 2026, it also applies to Indonesian nationals holding French multiple-entry visa with validy between 6 months to 5 years. |
| Réunion | Visa required | No visa required for holders of a permanent residency of France or one of the Schengen signatory states. Per July 2026, it also applies to Indonesian nationals holding French multiple-entry visa with validy between 6 months to 5 years. |
| Saint Pierre and Miquelon | Visa required | No visa required for holders of a permanent residency of France or one of the Schengen signatory states. Per July 2026, it also applies to Indonesian nationals holding French multiple-entry visa with validy between 6 months to 5 years. |
| Wallis and Futuna | Visa required | |
New Zealand
| Cook Islands | Visa not required | 31 days, including diplomatic passport |
| Niue | Visa not required | 30 days, including diplomatic passport |
| Tokelau | Visa required | |
United States
| American Samoa | Visa required | |
| Guam | Visa required | |
| Northern Mariana Islands | Visa required | |
| U.S. Virgin Islands | Visa required | |
| Puerto Rico | Visa required | |

== Non-ordinary passports ==
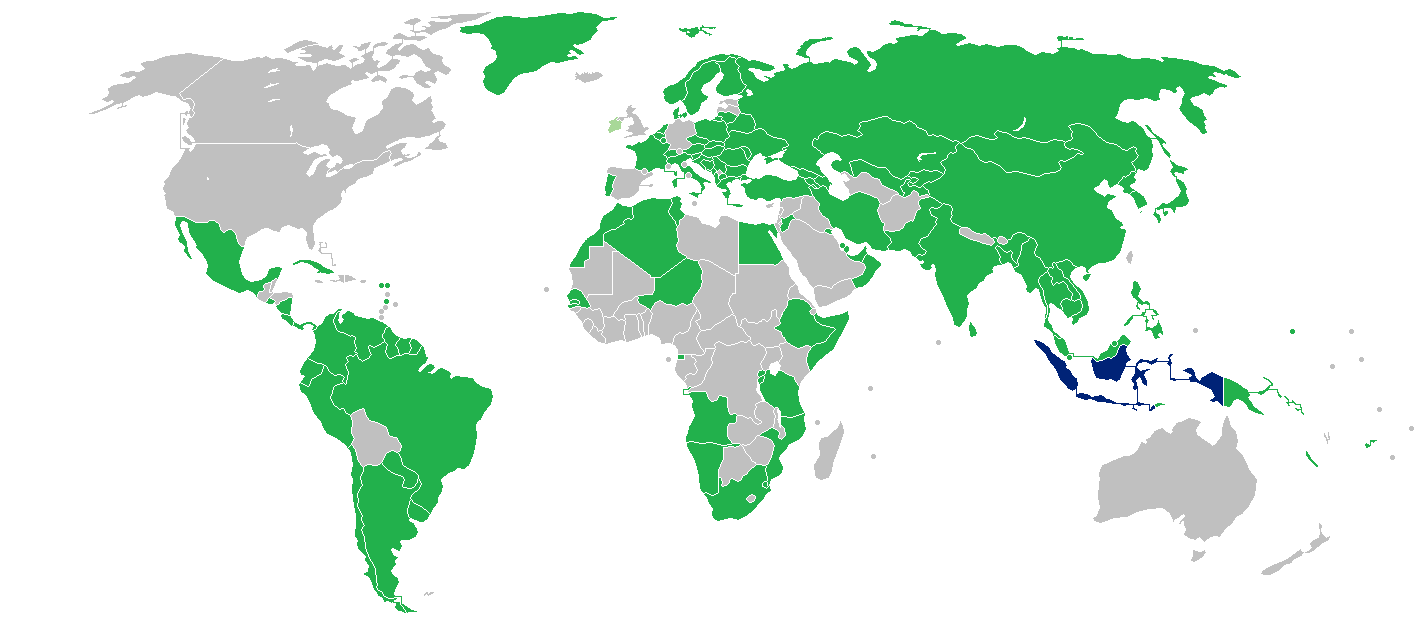
Visa requirements for Indonesian citizens holding diplomatic or service passports based on bilateral agreements Indonesia Visa-free for holders of both diplomatic and service passports Visa-free for holders of diplomatic passports only

Holders of Indonesian diplomatic or official / service passports may enter the following countries without a visa for 30 days (unless otherwise stated):

- Albania
- Algeria
- Angola
- Antigua and Barbuda
- Argentina
- Armenia
- Austria
- Azerbaijan
- Bahrain
- Bangladesh
- Belarus
- Belgium^{1}
- Bosnia and Herzegovina
- Brazil^{5}
- Brunei^{5}
- Bulgaria^{2}
- Burundi
- Cambodia^{5}
- Chile^{1}
- China
- Colombia
- Costa Rica
- Croatia
- Cuba
- Czech Republic^{2}
- Denmark^{2}
- Ecuador^{5}
- Egypt
- El Salvador
- Equatorial Guinea
- Eswatini
- Ethiopia
- Fiji
- Finland
- France
- Gambia
- Georgia
- Greece^{4}
- Guyana
- Hungary^{4}
- India
- Iran
- Ireland^{D}
- Italy^{2}
- Japan
- Jordan
- Kazakhstan
- Kuwait
- Kyrgyzstan
- Laos^{5}
- Lithuania^{2}
- Luxembourg^{1}
- Malaysia
- Mexico
- Moldova^{2}
- Mongolia
- Montenegro^{2}
- Morocco
- Mozambique
- Myanmar^{5}
- Namibia
- Nepal
- Netherlands^{1}
- Nicaragua^{1}
- Niger
- North Korea^{5}
- North Macedonia
- Norway^{2}
- Pakistan
- Panama
- Papua New Guinea
- Paraguay
- Peru
- Philippines
- Poland^{2}
- Portugal^{2}
- Qatar
- Romania
- Russia^{5}
- Rwanda
- Saint Kitts and Nevis
- Saint Lucia
- Senegal
- Serbia
- Singapore
- Slovakia^{2}
- Slovenia^{2}
- Solomon Islands
- Somalia
- South Africa
- South Korea
- Sri Lanka
- Suriname
- Sweden
- Switzerland^{2}
- Tajikistan
- Tanzania
- Thailand
- Timor-Leste
- Tunisia
- Turkey
- Ukraine
- United Arab Emirates^{3}
- Uruguay
- Venezuela
- Vietnam^{5}

_{D - Diplomatic passports only.}
_{1 – 90 days}
_{2 – 90 days within any 180-day period.}
_{3 – 60 days}
_{4 – 30 days within any 180-day period.}
_{5 – 14 days}

== Visa exemption due to having other visas ==
Although a visa is generally needed by Indonesian citizens who hold ordinary passports, some countries apply visa waivers providing the Indonesian passport holders are also in possession of a visa or residence permit for certain countries (mainly USA / Canada / UK / Schengen / Australia/New Zealand). Some countries who apply such rules are these:

1. Andorra: No formal visa required but multiple-entry Schengen visa is required.
2. Anguilla: Requires valid visa issued by U.K. Please read additional information.
3. Argentina: Electronic Travel Authorization (AVE) available for holders of US B2 visa or Schengen C visa (with at least 3 months' validity left) at a fee of 50 USD and for a stay of up to 90 days.
4. Belize: Visa on arrival for holder of valid multiple entry USA visa.
5. Bosnia and Herzegovina: Requires valid multiple-entry visa or residence permit issued by a Schengen or EU countries for stay up to 15 days.
6. British Virgin Islands: Requires visa issued by Canada, USA or United Kingdom valid for a minimum of 6 months on arrival. They must travel as tourists or on business for a maximum stay of 6 months.
7. Bulgaria: Valid visas and residence permits issued by Romania, Cyprus and Croatia.
8. Costa Rica: Requires valid visa from EU Member State, Canada, Japan, Korea (Rep. of) or USA, for a max.stay of 90 days.
9. Cyprus: Requires valid multiple entry Schengen visa ("C" or "D") or valid residence permit in any Schengen member states or valid multiple-entry visas and residence permits issued by Romania, Bulgaria and Croatia.
10. Dominican Republic: Requires visa issued by Canada, USA or any EU Member State for a max. stay of 30 days. Fee: USD 10.-. Extension possible.
11. Georgia: Requires valid visa/residence permit (min. 6 months from expire date) for Canada, the US, UK, a Schengen Member State, Overseas/Dependant Territories of GB & Northern Ireland, Middle East GCC, Japan, South Korea, Australia, or New Zealand for nationals of Indonesia.
12. Honduras: Requires valid visa for Canada, the USA or a Schengen Member State for nationals of Indonesia.
13. Kosovo: Requires valid multiple entry Schengen visa and stay up to 15 days.
14. Mexico: Requires permanent residency in Canada, Japan, the United Kingdom, the United States (B1/B2 visa also accepted) or the Schengen countries.
15. Montenegro: Requires visa issued by a Schengen Member State or U.S.A., or not longer than the expiry of the visa, if the validity of the visa is less than 7 days.
16. North Macedonia: Requires permanent residence permit of any EU or Schengen member states or a multiple entry Schengen visa (C). In case of possession of multiple entry Schengen type C visa, validity of the visa must be at least 5 days than the planned stay in North Macedonia.
17. Panama: Requires visa issued by USA/UK/Canada/Australia/any member countries of the EU, which has been used at least once to enter those countries AND must buy tourist card that is of 30 USD on arrival.
18. Romania:Permanent residence permits issued by the UK or Ireland (the validity of which is of 5 years or more) or valid visa issued by Bulgaria, Cyprus or Croatia.
19. São Tomé and Príncipe: Requires visa issued by USA or a Schengen Member state together with a passport valid for a minimum of 3 months from the arrival date for a maximum stay of 15 days.
20. Saudi Arabia: Passengers and first-degree family members of passengers with a tourist or business visa issued by USA, United Kingdom or a Schengen Member State traveling as tourists can obtain a visa on arrival for a maximum stay of 90 days. The visa must have been used at least once and should have an entry stamp of the issuing country. Passengers are allowed a total stay of 90 days within a period of 12 months.
21. South Korea: Requires valid visa of USA/Canada/Australia/New Zealand and is travelling between one of those countries to/from a third country and hold a confirmed onward ticket departing within 30 days.
22. Taiwan: Online Application for Travel Authorization Certificate (TAC) available for Indonesian passport holders who hold visa/residence permit/permanent residence certificate issued by the USA/Canada/South Korea/UK/Schengen Convention countries, which may be valid or has expired less than 10 years prior to the date of arrival, or valid electronic visa issued by Australia/New Zealand by the time of arrival, Japanese visa/visa waiver together with proof of record of entering Japan or confirmed onward ticket to Japan, or South Korean visa together with proof of record of entering South Korea. TAC is also available to those who have a visa/residence permit issued by Taiwan (ROC) which has expired less than 10 years prior to the date of arrival; holders of entry visas bearing the remark FL (migrant worker), X (others), or P with "Special permission from MOFA" (visa and eVisa for "Project for Simplifying Visa Regulations for High-end Group Tourists from Southeast Asian Countries (Project Kuan-Hong)" ever issued), as well as holders of Taiwan (ROC) resident cards with stated purpose of residence being migrant worker (移工), are not eligible for a TAC.
23. Turks and Caicos Islands: Requires visa for Canada, United Kingdom or the USA.

== APEC Business Travel Card ==
Full members of the scheme Transitional members (United States, Canada)

Holders of an APEC Business Travel Card (ABTC) travelling on business do not require a visa to the following countries:

- Australia^{2}
- Brunei^{2}
- Chile^{2}
- China^{4}
- Hong Kong^{4}
- Japan^{2}
- Malaysia^{2}
- Mexico^{1}
- New Zealand^{2}
- Papua New Guinea^{4}
- Peru^{2}
- Philippines^{4}
- Russia^{3}
- Singapore^{4}
- South Korea^{2}
- Taiwan^{2}
- Thailand^{2}
- Vietnam^{4}

_{1 - Up to 180 days}
_{2 - Up to 90 days}
_{3 - Up to 90 days in a period of 180 days}
_{4 - Up to 60 days}

The card must be used in conjunction with a passport and has the following advantages:

- No need to apply for a visa or entry permit to APEC countries, as the card is treated as such (except by Canada and United States)
- Undertake legitimate business in participating economies
- Expedited border crossing in all member economies, including transitional members

== Visa requirements amendment log ==
America

24 August 2015: During a meeting with the Vice President of Panama, Isabel Saint Malo at the East Asia-Latin America Cooperation in San José, Costa Rica, the foreign minister of Indonesia, Retno Marsudi formally requested Panama to provide a visa on arrival facility to Indonesians.

30 September 2015: In a bilateral meeting with the foreign minister of Mexico, Claudia Ruiz Massieu in the United Nations headquarters in New York, Retno Marsudi requested Mexico to give reciprocal treatment for a visa waiver policy for Indonesians to visit Mexico.

26 October 2015: In response to Indonesia's recent policy to abolish visa requirements for American citizens, the United States government plans to extend non-immigrant visas' validity issued to nationals of Indonesia to up to 10 years.

22 May 2018: Indonesian Foreign Minister, Retno Marsudi on her meeting with her Argentine counterpart, Jorge Faurie in Buenos Aires requests Argentina to ease visa application procedure for Indonesian citizens wanting to visit the South American nation.

15 May 2019: Barbados abolished visa requirement for regular passport holders for visa.

Asia

March 2015: The government of Indonesia plans to pursue a reciprocal visa-waiver agreement with China, Japan, South Korea and Russia.

5 August 2015: During her visit to the 48th AMM in Kuala Lumpur, the foreign minister of Indonesia, Retno Marsudi and the foreign minister of South Korea, Yun Byung-se discussed further implementation of visa exemption agreements for Indonesians to travel to South Korea. Negotiation for the same agreements also discussed with her Russian counterpart, foreign minister of Russia, Sergei Lavrov for further implementation of visa exemption agreements for Indonesians to travel to Russia.

21 October 2015: In the Joint Commission for Bilateral Cooperation (JCBC) meeting between Indonesia and Mongolia in Jakarta, Indonesia's Foreign Affairs Deputy Minister, A.M. Fachir and Mongolia State Secretary/Acting Foreign Affairs Vice Minister, Damba Gankhuyag are planning to arrange a mutual reciprocal visa waiver for holders of ordinary passports of both countries.

24 October 2015: On the sidelines meeting of the Ocean Rim Association in Padang, West Sumatra, Indonesian Foreign Minister Retno Marsudi and Indian Minister of State for Foreign Affairs Vijay Kumar Singh are planning to arrange a mutual reciprocal visa waiver for holders of ordinary passport of both countries.

8 June 2016: The Taiwan government plans to extend its visa exemption scheme to Indonesian passport holders, as well as visa simplification to the rest 7 ASEAN nations. Visitors from Brunei, Cambodia, Indonesia, Laos, Myanmar, the Philippines, Thailand and Vietnam will be granted entry privileges such as visa waivers, landing visas or e-visas, according to the report. Visitors from three others ASEAN member nations, Malaysia, Singapore, and Thailand already enjoy visa exemptions for stays of up to 30 days in Taiwan.

19 February 2019: At Investment Summit 2019 in Kathmandu, Nepal, Indonesian Ambassador to Bangladesh, Rina Soemarno requests that Bangladesh grants Indonesian passport holder visa-free access to the country based on reciprocity.

Europe
April 2015: Delegation of Indonesia and parliament of Romania has raised a possibility of waiving visa requirements for holders of diplomatic, service, and ordinary passports of both countries.

10 July 2015: Foreign minister of Indonesia, Retno Marsudi and European Commission Vice President, Frans Timmermans are planning to have a mutual reciprocal visa waiver arrangements for holders of ordinary passport of Indonesia and the European Union. During her meeting with Federica Mogherini at 48th AMM that was held in Kuala Lumpur early August 2015, Minister Retno Marsudi requested support from the European Union counterpart for abolishing Schengen visa requirements for Indonesian citizens.

July 27, 2015: During his visit in Indonesia, the prime minister of the United Kingdom, David Cameron and the president of Indonesia, Joko Widodo raised a possibility to abolish visa requirements for holders of diplomatic, service and ordinary passport of Indonesia.

31 July 2015: Indonesian Ambassador to Bulgaria and Albania and Bulgarian Vice Minister of Foreign Affairs have raised possibility of waiving visa requirements for holders of ordinary passports of both countries.

26 August 2015: In an interview to Indonesian media on 26 August 2015, Russian Ambassador to Indonesia, Mikhail Y Galuzin told that his government is ready to waive visa requirements to ordinary passport of Indonesia. Date of implementation is not determined yet because talks and negotiations are still on going.

28 September 2015: In the 70th UN General Assembly in New York, the foreign minister of Indonesia, Retno Marsudi requested support from her French and German counterparts to secure visa-free access to the Schengen Area for Indonesian citizens. Foreign minister of France, Laurent Fabius and foreign minister of Germany, Frank Walter Steinmeier are committed to support Indonesia's request by the time this issue is discussed at the EU Commission. Belgium, Denmark, Finland, Latvia, Lithuania, Luxembourg, Netherlands, Portugal and Romania also give their support for Indonesia to get a visa-free access to Schengen Area.

5 November 2015: On the sidelines of the EU-ASEAN ministerial meeting in Luxembourg, the European Commission has reportedly included Indonesia in a list of countries proposed for review by the European Council. Indonesia's proposal will be submitted to the council early next year. European Council then will ask three main entities (Frontex, Europol and EASO) to study and review Indonesia's eligibility. If the study results are positive then the Council and the European Commission will propose a new regulation regarding the status change of Indonesia to get visa-free Schengen.

27 April 2016: During his visit in Indonesia, the president of Serbia, Tomislav Nikolić and the president of Indonesia, Joko Widodo raised a possibility to abolish visa requirements for holders of diplomatic and service passports.

17 May 2017: President Grybauskaite, during her state visit to Indonesia, expressed Lithuania's readiness to support the negotiations on CEPA and the free-visa policy for EU member states as such cooperation will help to generate a revenue of €2.5 billion.

23 November 2018: Vice Chairman of Indonesia's People's Consultative Assembly, Ahmad Muzani requests Bosnia and Herzegovina to grant Indonesian passport holder visa-free travel to the Balkan nation.

13 July 2025: Following the conclusion of negotiations between Indonesia and the European Union on the CEPA, Indonesian President Prabowo Subianto and European Commission President Ursula von der Leyen announced that Indonesians will be granted a multiple-entry Schengen visa under a cascade regime for Indonesian nationals who are visiting Schengen Area countries for the second time.

Africa
1960 - Mohammed V of Morocco gave visa-free access to Indonesian citizens following President Soekarno's visit to Morocco on 2 May 1960. Still valid in 2026, making it one of the longest valid visa-free access to Indonesian citizens.

1 July 2021 - Tunisia gave visa-free access to Indonesian citizens

Oceania
1 November 1987 - Visa-free access was given by New Zealand.

1 October 1998 - 15 days visa-free access was given to Indonesian citizens to access Guam.

21 October 1998 - Visa-free access from New Zealand was revoked

28 November 2009 - Visa-free access to Guam was revoked

== Non-visa restrictions ==
=== Blank passport pages ===
Many countries require a minimum number of blank pages to be available in the passport being presented, typically one or two pages. Endorsement pages, which often appear after the visa pages, are not counted as being valid or available.

=== Vaccination ===
Cover of the new International Certificate of Vaccination issued by the Bureau of Quarantine in the Philippines since 2021

The African countries of Angola, Benin, Burkina Faso, Burundi, Cameroon, Central African Republic, Democratic Republic of the Congo, Republic of the Congo, Côte d'Ivoire, Gabon, Ghana, Guinea-Bissau, Mali, Niger, Sierra Leone and Togo, South Sudan and Uganda, along with French Guiana in South America, require all incoming passengers older than nine months to one year, to have a current International Certificate of Vaccination or Prophylaxis.

Some other countries require vaccination only if the passenger is coming from an infected area or has visited one recently or has transited for 12 hours in those countries: Algeria, Botswana, Cabo Verde, Chad, Djibouti, Egypt, Eswatini, Ethiopia, Gambia, Ghana, Guinea, Lesotho, Libya, Equatorial Guinea, Eritrea, Madagascar, Malawi, Mauritania, Mauritius, Mozambique, Namibia, Nigeria, Papua New Guinea, Seychelles, Somalia, South Africa, Sudan, Tunisia, Uganda, Tanzania, Zambia and Zimbabwe.

=== Passport validity length ===
Very few countries, such as Paraguay, just require a valid passport on arrival.

However many countries and groupings now require only an identity card – especially from their neighbours. Other countries may have special bilateral arrangements that depart from the generality of their passport validity length policies to shorten the period of passport validity required for each other's citizens or even accept passports that have already expired (but not been cancelled).

Some countries, such as Japan, Ireland and the United Kingdom, require a passport valid throughout the period of the intended stay.

In the absence of specific bilateral agreements, countries requiring passports to be valid for at least 6 more months on arrival include Afghanistan, Algeria, Anguilla, Bahrain, Bhutan, Botswana, British Virgin Islands, Brunei, Cambodia, Cameroon, Cape Verde, Cayman Islands, Central African Republic, Chad, Comoros, Costa Rica, Côte d'Ivoire, Curaçao, Ecuador, Egypt, El Salvador, Equatorial Guinea, Fiji, Gabon, Guinea Bissau, Guyana, Haiti, India, Indonesia, Iran, Iraq, Israel, Jordan, Kenya, Kiribati, Kuwait, Laos, Madagascar, Malaysia, Marshall Islands, Mongolia, Myanmar, Namibia, Nepal, Nicaragua, Nigeria, Oman, Palau, Papua New Guinea, Peru, Philippines, Qatar, Rwanda, Samoa, Saudi Arabia, Singapore, Solomon Islands, Somalia, Sri Lanka, Sudan, Suriname, Tanzania, Thailand, Timor-Leste, Tokelau, Tonga, Turkey, Tuvalu, Uganda, United Arab Emirates, Vanuatu, Venezuela, and Vietnam.

Countries requiring passports valid for at least 4 months on arrival include Micronesia and Zambia.

Countries requiring passports with a validity of at least 3 months beyond the date of intended departure include Azerbaijan, Bosnia and Herzegovina, Honduras, Montenegro, Nauru, Moldova and New Zealand. Similarly, the EEA countries of Iceland, Liechtenstein, Norway, all European Union countries (except Ireland) together with Switzerland also require 3 months validity beyond the date of the bearer's intended departure unless the bearer is an EEA or Swiss national.

Countries requiring passports valid for at least 3 months on arrival include Albania, North Macedonia, Panama, and Senegal.

Bermuda requires passports to be valid for at least 45 days upon entry.

Countries that require a passport validity of at least one month beyond the date of intended departure include Eritrea, Hong Kong, Lebanon, Macau, the Maldives and South Africa.

==== Maximum passport age ====
Countries of the Schengen area require non-EU passports to be less than 10 years old upon entry.

=== Criminal record ===
Some countries, including Australia, Canada, Fiji, New Zealand and the United States, routinely deny entry to non-citizens who have a criminal record, while others impose restrictions depending on the type of conviction and the length of the sentence.

=== Persona non grata ===
The government of a country can declare a diplomat persona non grata, banning them from entering the country or expelling them if they have already entered. In non-diplomatic use, the authorities of a country may also declare a foreigner persona non grata permanently or temporarily, usually because of unlawful activity.

=== Israeli stamps ===
Kuwait, Lebanon, Libya, and Yemen do not allow entry to people with passport stamps from Israel or whose passports have either a used or an unused Israeli visa, or where there is evidence of previous travel to Israel such as entry or exit stamps from neighbouring border posts in transit countries such as Jordan and Egypt.

To circumvent this Arab League boycott of Israel, the Israeli immigration services have now mostly ceased to stamp foreign nationals' passports on either entry to or exit from Israel (unless the entry is for some work-related purposes). Since 15 January 2013, Israel no longer stamps foreign passports at Ben Gurion Airport. Passports are still (as of 22 June 2017) stamped at Erez when passing into and out of Gaza.

Iran refuses admission to holders of passports containing an Israeli visa or stamp that is less than 12 months old.

=== Biometrics ===
Several countries mandate that all travellers, or all foreign travellers, be fingerprinted on arrival and will refuse admission to or even arrest travellers who refuse to comply. In some countries, such as the United States, this may apply even to transit passengers who merely wish to change planes rather than go landside.

Fingerprinting countries/regions include Afghanistan, Argentina, Brunei, Cambodia, China, Ethiopia, Ghana, Guinea, India, Japan, Kenya (both fingerprints and a photo are taken), Malaysia upon entry and departure, Mongolia, Saudi Arabia, the Schengen Area, Singapore, South Korea, Taiwan, Thailand, Uganda, the United Arab Emirates and the United States.

Many countries also require a photo be taken of people entering the country. The United States, which does not fully implement exit control formalities at its land frontiers (although long mandated by its own legislation), intends to implement facial recognition for passengers departing from international airports to identify people who overstay their visa.

Together with fingerprint and face recognition, iris scanning is one of three biometric identification technologies internationally standardised since 2006 by the International Civil Aviation Organization (ICAO) for use in e-passports and the United Arab Emirates conducts iris scanning on visitors who need to apply for a visa. The United States Department of Homeland Security has announced plans to greatly increase the biometric data it collects at US borders. In 2018, Singapore began trials of iris scanning at three land and maritime immigration checkpoints.

== See also ==
- Visa policy of Indonesia
- Indonesian passport
