= Paspor Orang Asing =

The Paspor Orang Asing is an alien's passport issued by Indonesia. It is a two-year, 24-page document issued to persons permanently resident in Indonesia who cannot obtain travel documents from any other country. It is referred to in English variously as "Indonesian Passport for Aliens", "Indonesian Stateless Person Passport", or "Indonesian Stateless Travel Document".

== Details ==
The 1950 Travel Documents Act used the term "Paspor Orang Asing" (POA) and in Article 5 authorised the issuance of POAs to persons dwelling in Indonesia. Article 6 stated that the validity period would only be eight to twelve months and could not be extended, in contrast to ordinary passports which were issued for two years and could be extended twice by that same length of time. The 1959 Travel Documents Act switched to using the term "Paspor Untuk Orang Asing" (PUOA) but gave similar provisions on issuance, and authorised a longer validity period of eighteen months, again non-renewable. Article 34 of the 1992 Immigration Act restricted the issuance of PUOAs to aliens permanently resident in Indonesia, and clarified that a PUOA loses validity if its holder obtains a travel document from another country. 1994 Travel Document Regulations explained that the PUOA is equivalent to the international term "certificate of identity", and that its period of validity may not be extended. The 2011 Immigration Act makes no provision for the PUOA, only for a travel document in lieu of an alien's passport.

They were commonly issued to pro-Kuomintang ethnic Chinese residents not born in Indonesia, who were regarded as stateless by the Indonesian government since they were not covered by the People's Republic of China–Indonesia Dual Nationality Treaty.

== Acceptance ==
Immigration New Zealand states that the POA is an acceptable travel document for visa issuance purposes, provided that it is valid for New Zealand and the other countries which the holder will pass through, and has been properly endorsed with an Indonesian re-entry permit valid for at least three months after the expected date of departure from New Zealand. As of 2007, the Benelux countries, Spain, France, Italy, Lithuania, Portugal, Slovenia, and Norway have explicitly indicated that they do not recognise Indonesian alien's travel documents and will not affix visas to them. Other European Union countries did not provide the Council of the European Union's Visa Working Party with any information on their acceptance. No EU country explicitly indicated their acceptance of them. In April 2010 the Czech Republic became the first EU country to explicitly indicate their acceptance of it.
