= Hajj passport =

Special passport for pilgrimage to Mecca

Algerian hajj passport (2008)

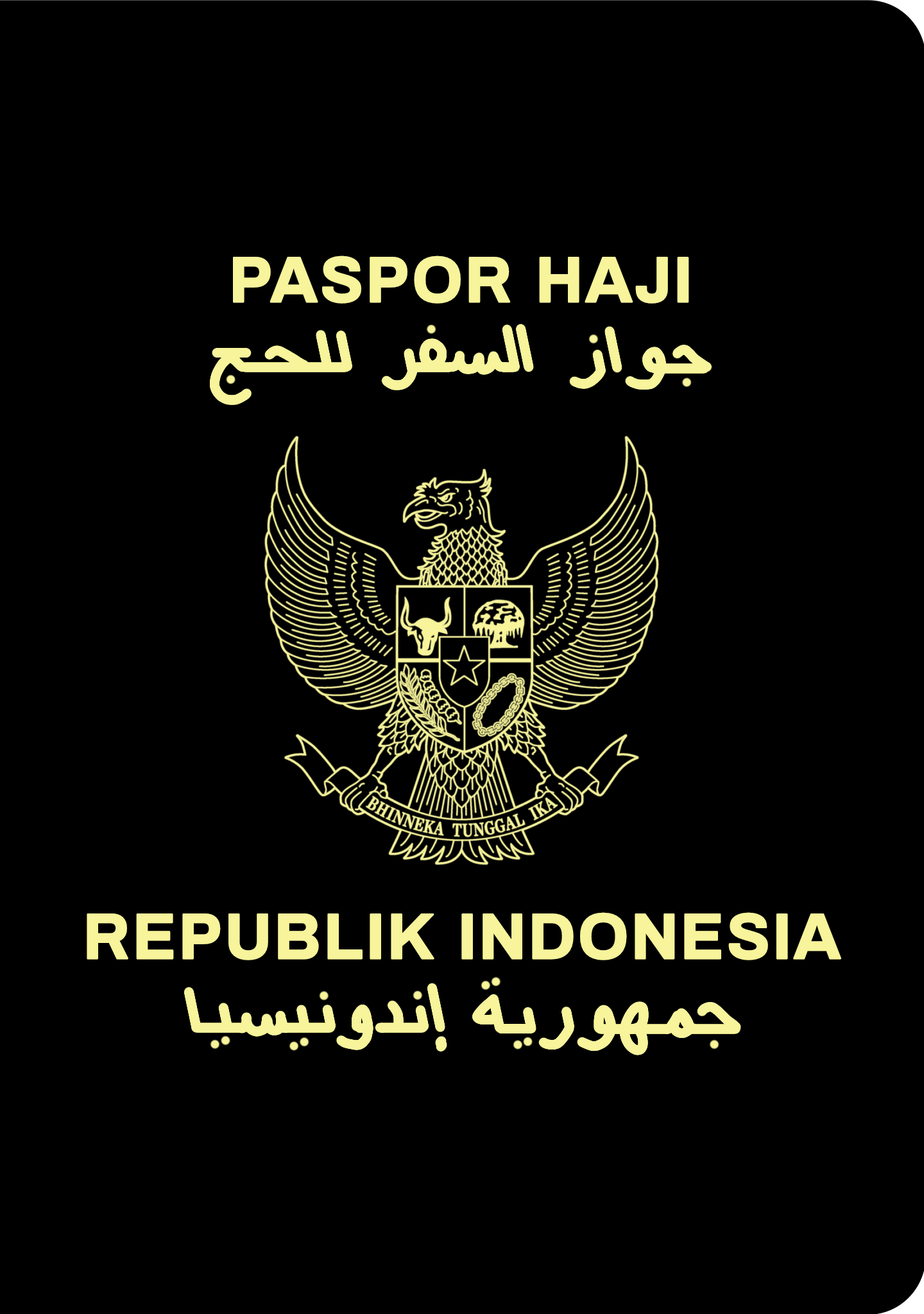
Indonesian hajj passport (before 2009)

A Hajj passport was a special passport used only for entry into Saudi Arabia for the purpose of performing hajj (Muslim pilgrimage to Mecca and adjacent sites). This passport is no longer used, as Saudi Authorities have required ordinary passports since 2009.

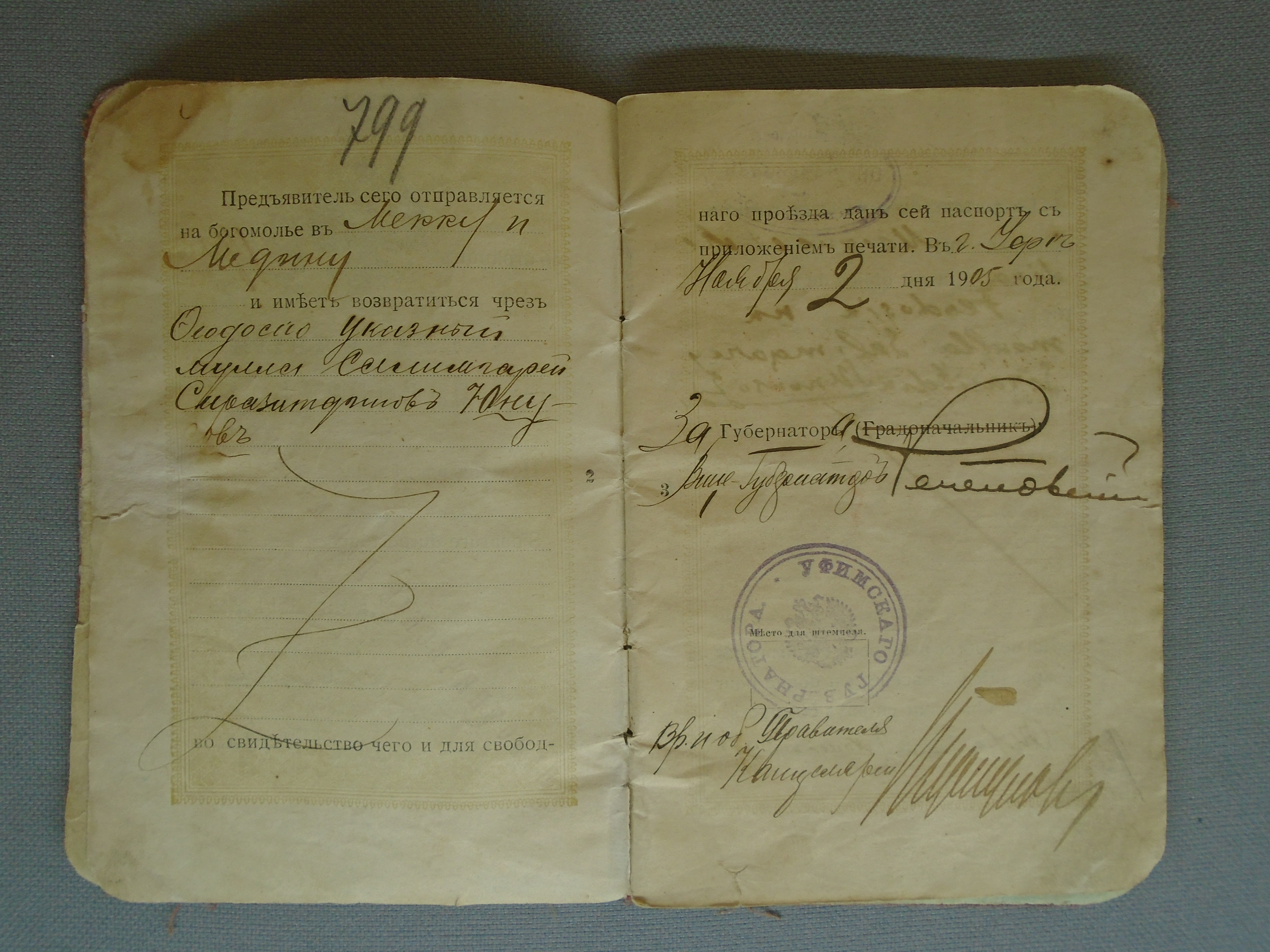
Special hajj passport issued on November 2nd, 1905 by Imperial Russian authorities to a Tatar man for a pilgrimage to Mecca and Medina.

== Issuing countries ==
- Afghanistan
- Algeria
- Bahrain
- Bangladesh (for Bangladeshi Muslims only)
- Brunei
- China (for Chinese Muslims only)
- Egypt
- Eritrea (for Eritrean Muslims only)
- India (for Indian Muslims only)
- Indonesia (for Indonesian Muslims only)
- Iran
- Jordan (also issues a temporary Jordanian passport combined with a Hajj passport to Israeli Muslims)
- Kuwait
- Lebanon (for Lebanese Muslims only)
- Libya
- Malaysia (for Malaysian Muslims only)
- Maldives
- Morocco
- Pakistan (for most Pakistani Muslims, not including Ahmadiyya Muslims)
- Palestine (for Arab Muslims only)
- Philippines (for Filipino Muslims only)
- Qatar
- Senegal
- Somalia
- Syria
- Thailand (for Thai Muslims only; see also Saudi Arabia–Thailand relations)
- Tunisia
- United Arab Emirates

== See also ==
- Passport
