= Polycarbonate e-passport =

Biometric travel document

Examples of polycarbonate data pages

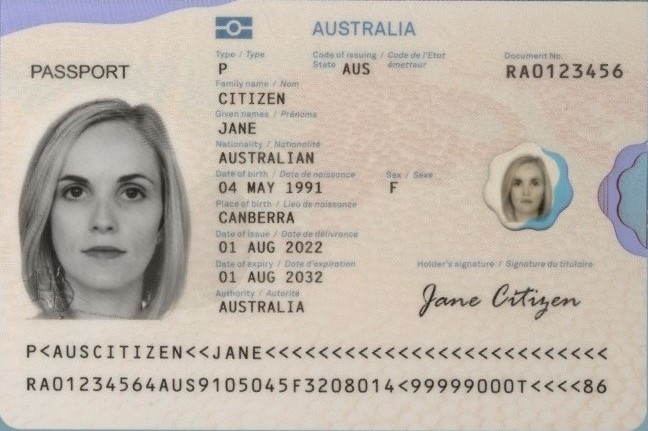
Australian passport

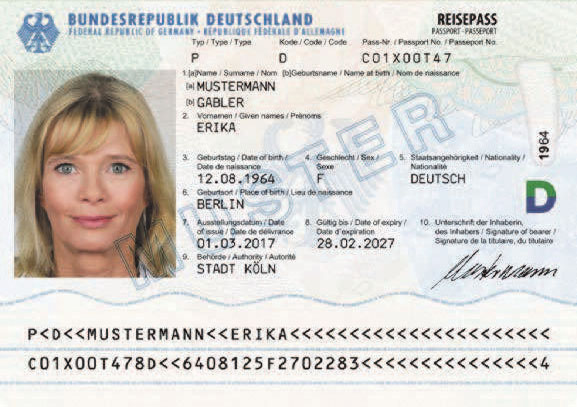
German passport

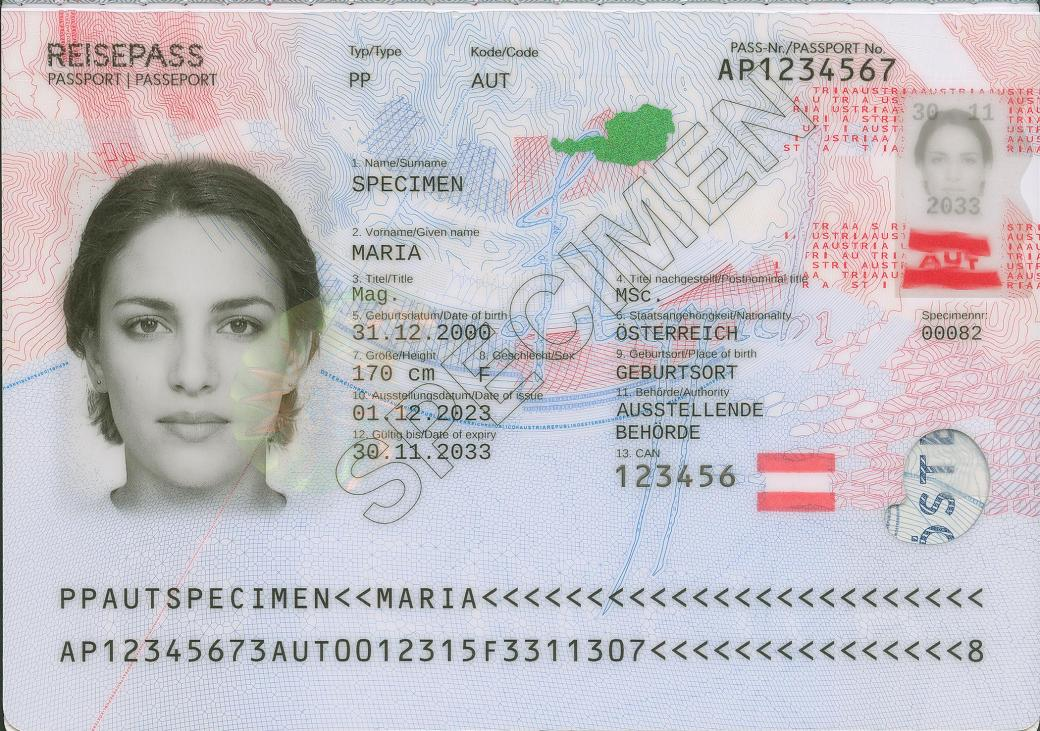
Austrian passport

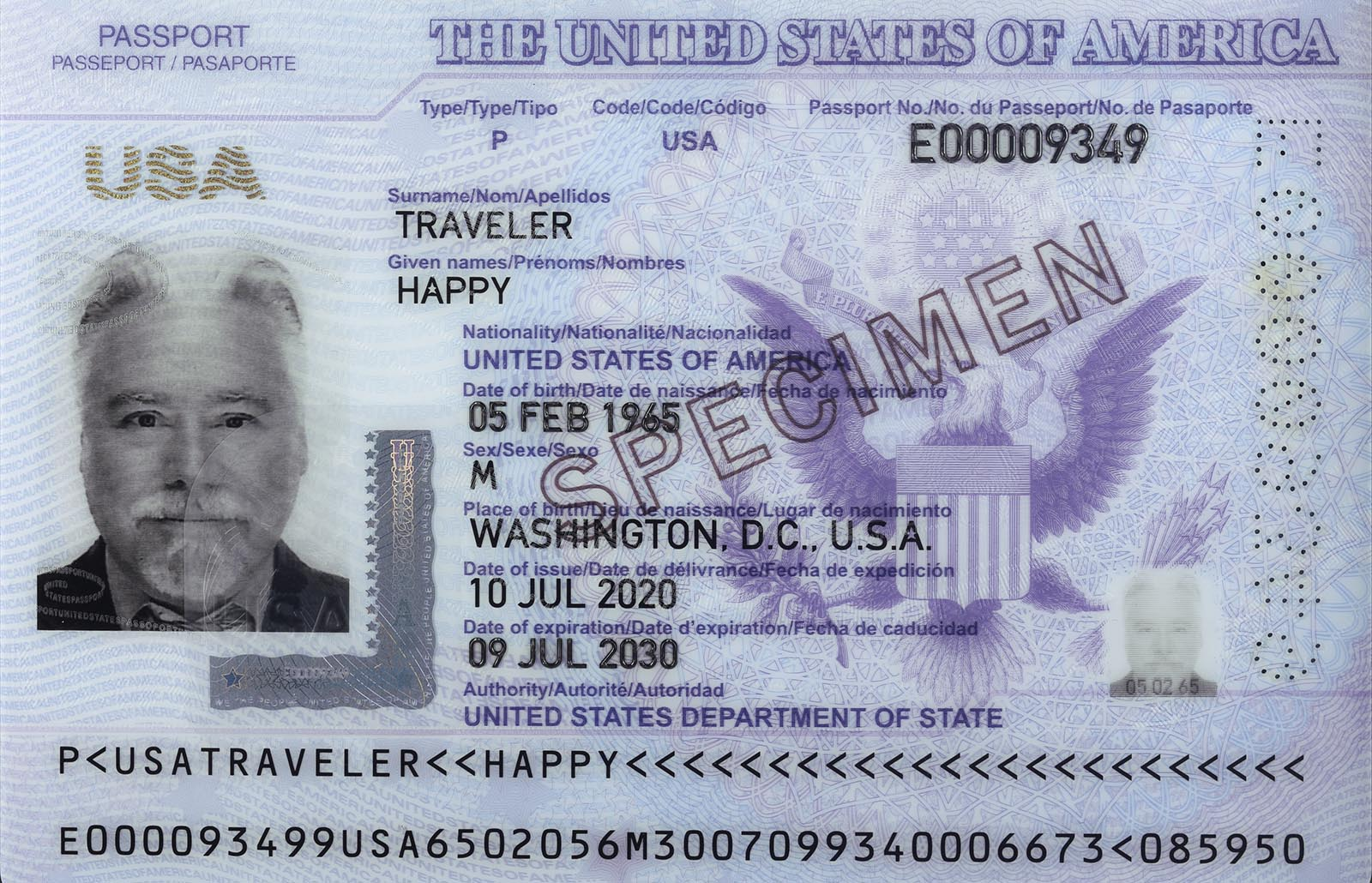
United States passport

A polycarbonate e-passport is a type of travel document that features a biometric data page made from polycarbonate, a durable thermoplastic material, rather than a traditional paper or laminated paper sheet. Polycarbonate passports are designed to improve document durability, security, and resistance to tampering, by laser-engraving information into the inner layers of the plastic, which significantly enhances protection against counterfeiting and ensures greater long-term reliability compared to traditional laminated pages.

== History ==
Finland was the first country to introduce a passport with a polycarbonate data page in 1997. Sweden followed shortly after, becoming the first to implement a biometric polycarbonate data page during the early adoption of e-passports. Since then, the design has gradually been adopted around the world.

As of 2019, over 40 countries have transitioned from laminated paper biometric data pages to polycarbonate alternatives in their passports.

== Global adoption ==
- Argentina: Issued since February 2026.
- Australia: Issued since September 2022.
- Bangladesh: Issued since January 2020.
- Brunei: Issued since 2008.
- Cambodia: Issued since 2014.
- Canada: Introduced in May 2023.
- Chile: Issued since December 2024.
- Colombia: Previously issued from September 2010 to April 2026.
- Cyprus: Issued since 2026.
- East Timor: Issued since 2017.
- Hong Kong: Issued since 2007.
- Indonesia: Issued since 2023.
- Japan: Issued since March 2025.
- Jordan: Issued since 2025.
- Macau: Issued since 2009.
- Malaysia: Issued since 2013.
- Maldives: Issued since 2016.
- New Zealand: Issued since 2009.
- Poland: Issued since 2018.
- Pakistan: Issued since 2022.
- Singapore: Issued since 2006.
- South Africa: Issued since 8 April 2009.
- South Korea: Issued since 2021.
- Thailand: Issued since 2020.
- United Arab Emirates: Issued since 2024.
- United Kingdom: Issued since 2020.
- United States: Issued since 2021.
- Ukraine: Issued since 2015.

== See also ==
- Biometric passport
