= List of diplomatic missions in Mozambique =

This is a list of diplomatic missions in Mozambique. At present, the capital city of Maputo hosts 54 embassies/high commissions.

Several other countries have non-resident ambassadors accredited from other capitals in Southern Africa, such as Pretoria, Luanda, and Harare.

Honorary consulates are omitted from this listing.

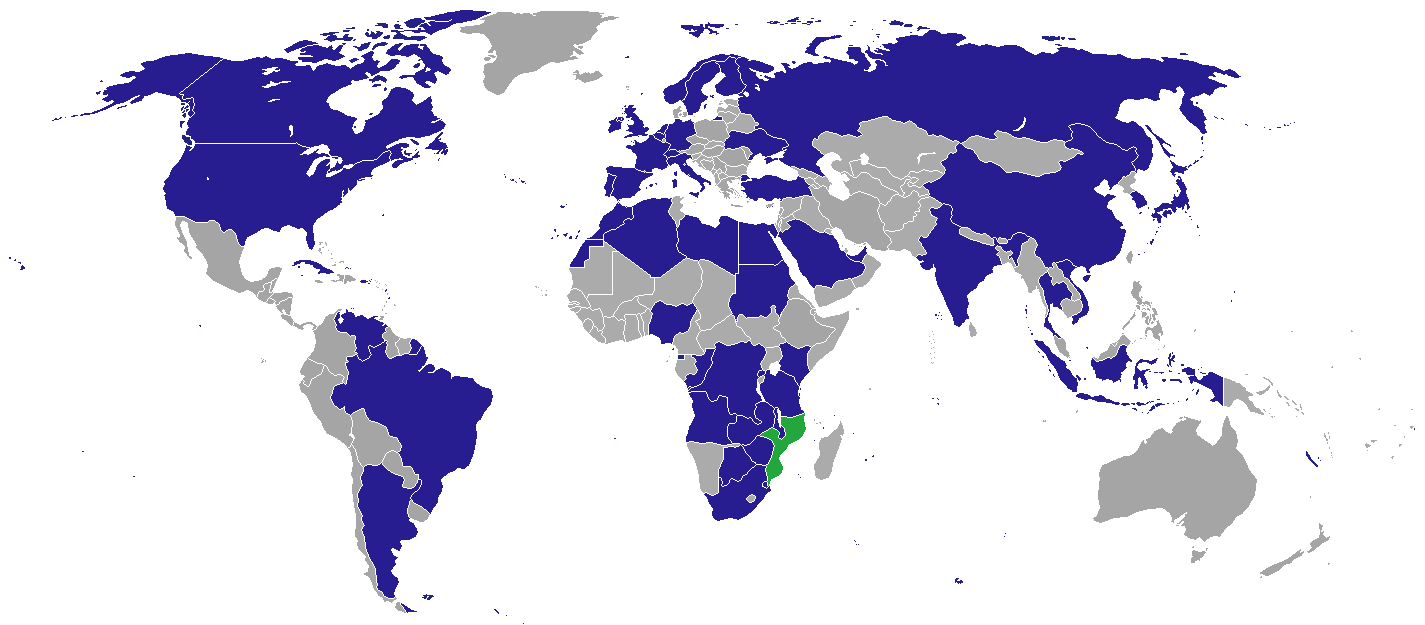
Map of diplomatic missions in Mozambique

== Diplomatic missions in Maputo ==
=== Embassies/High Commissions ===
Entries marked with an asterisk (*) are member-states of the Commonwealth of Nations. As such, their embassies are formally termed as "high commissions".

1. Algeria
2. Angola
3. Argentina
4. Botswana*
5. Brazil
6. Canada*
7. China
8. Congo-Brazzaville
9. Congo-Kinshasa
10. Cuba
11. Egypt
12. Equatorial Guinea
13. Eswatini*
14. Finland
15. France
16. Germany
17. Holy See
18. India*
19. Indonesia
20. Ireland
21. Italy
22. Japan
23. Kenya
24. Libya
25. Malawi
26. Mauritius
27. Morocco
28. Netherlands
29. Nigeria
30. Norway
31. Palestine
32. Portugal
33. Russia
34. Rwanda
35. Sahrawi Republic
36. Saudi Arabia
37. South Africa
38. South Korea
39. Spain
40. Sovereign Military Order of Malta
41. Sweden
42. Switzerland
43. Tanzania
44. Thailand
45. Timor-Leste
46. Turkey
47. Ukraine
48. United Arab Emirates
49. United Kingdom*
50. United States
51. Venezuela
52. Vietnam
53. Zambia*
54. Zimbabwe

=== Other missions and delegations ===
1. Belgium (Diplomatic office)
2. European Union (Delegation)

=== Gallery ===
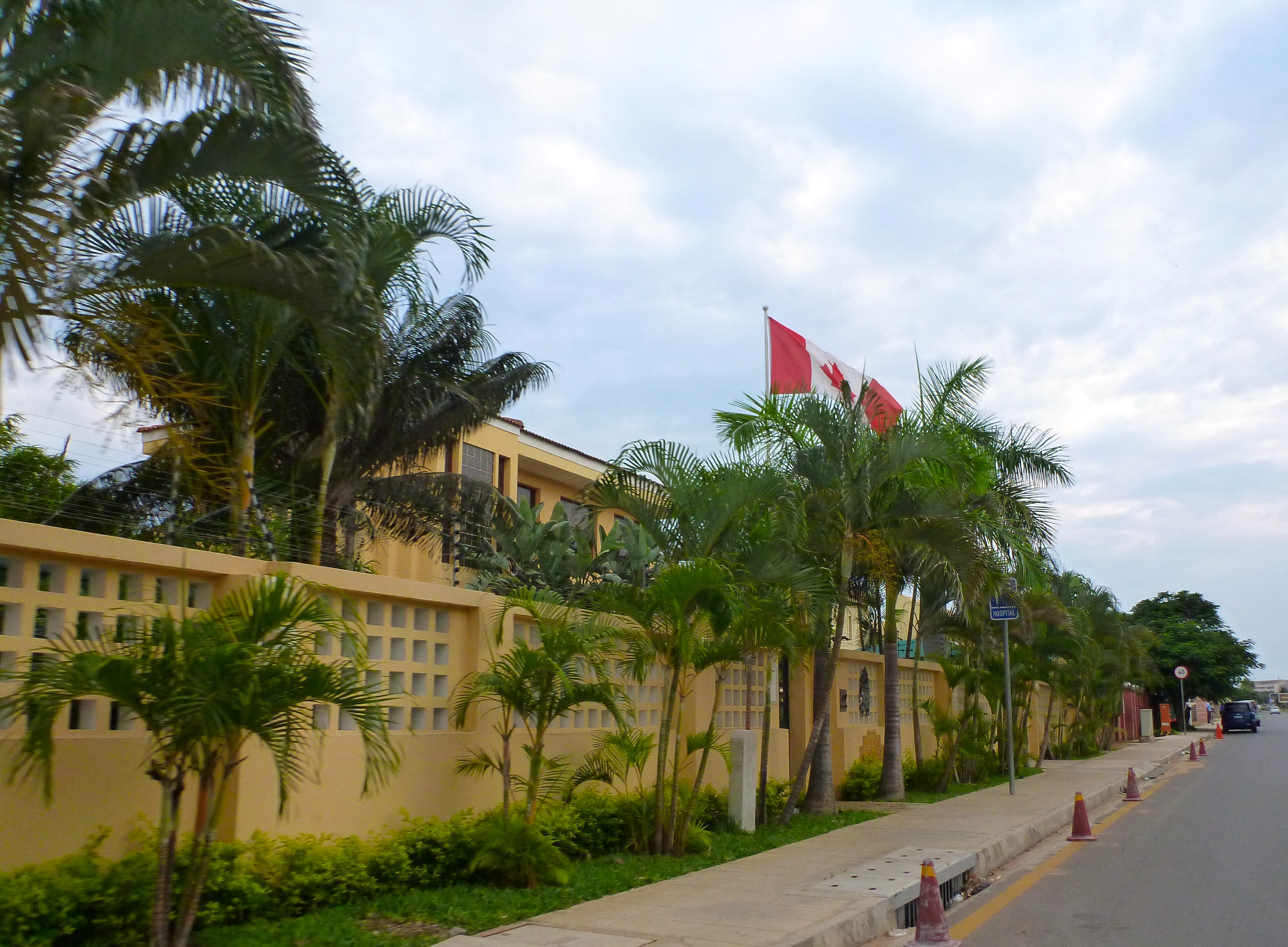
High Commission of Canada

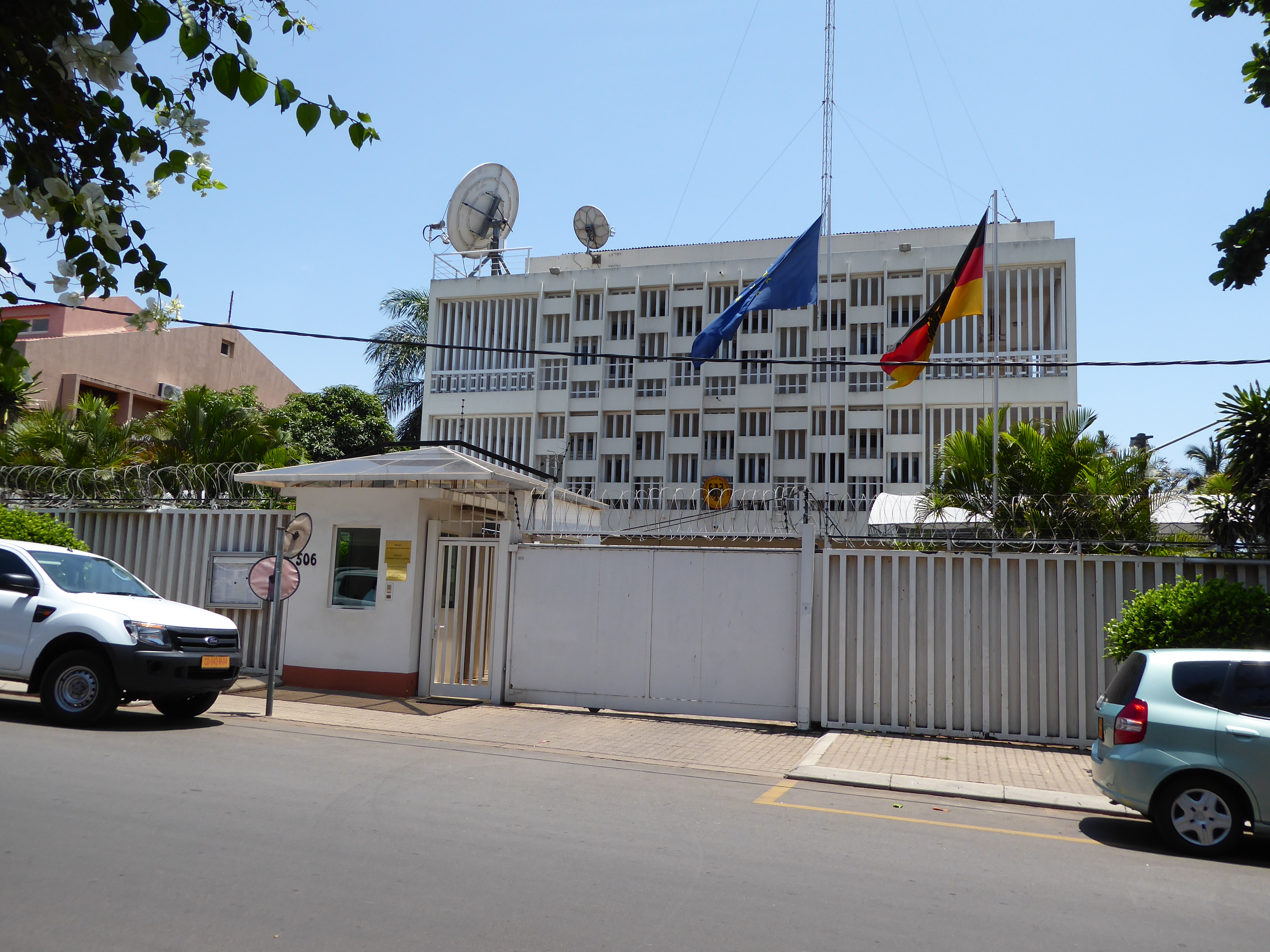
Embassy of Germany

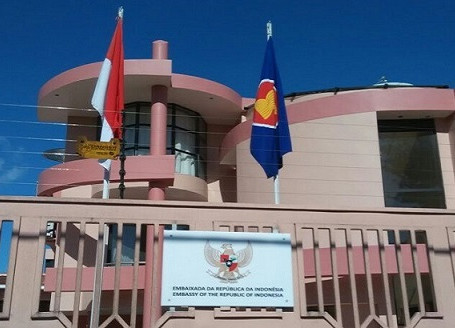
Embassy of Indonesia

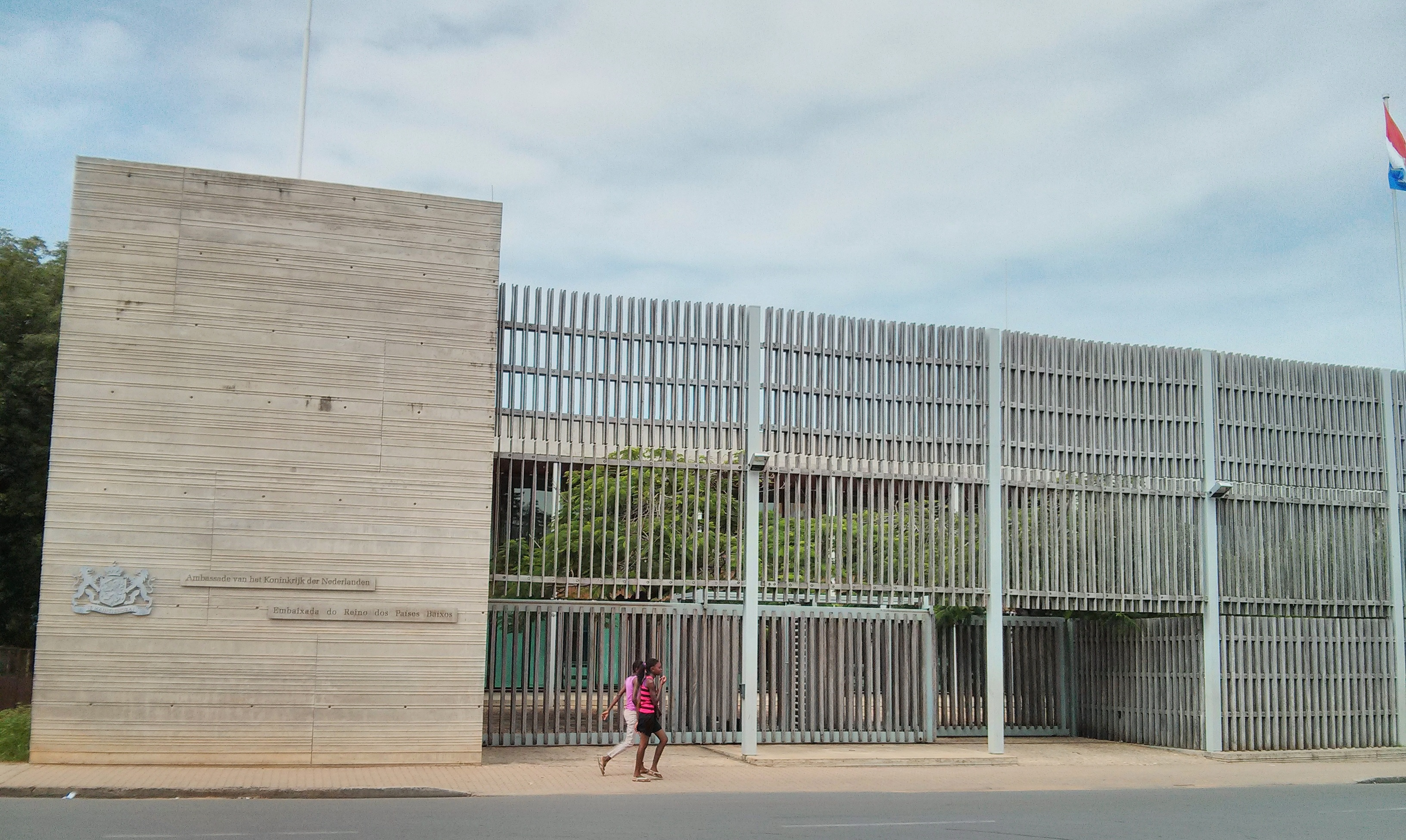
Embassy of the Netherlands

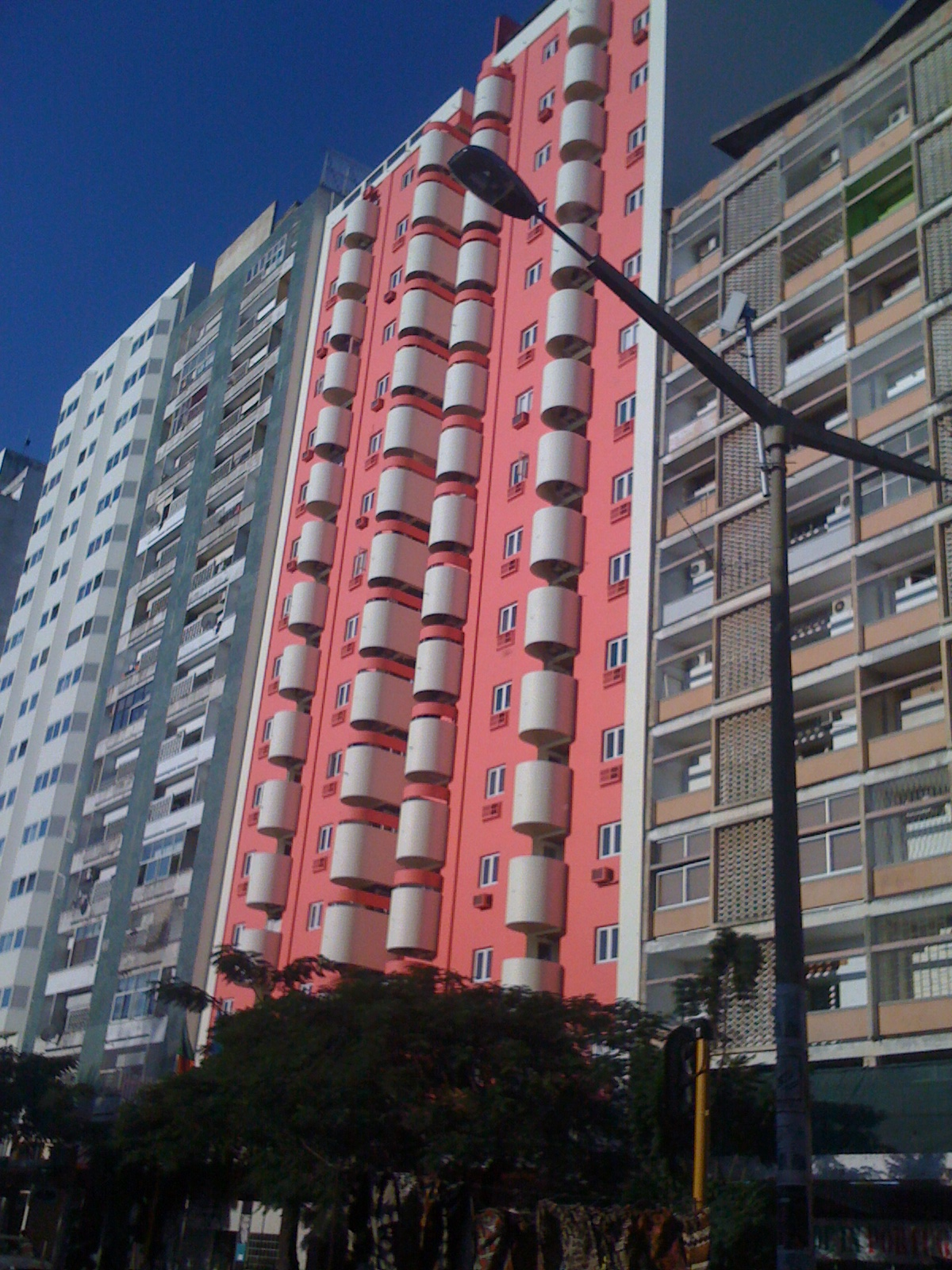
Embassy of Portugal

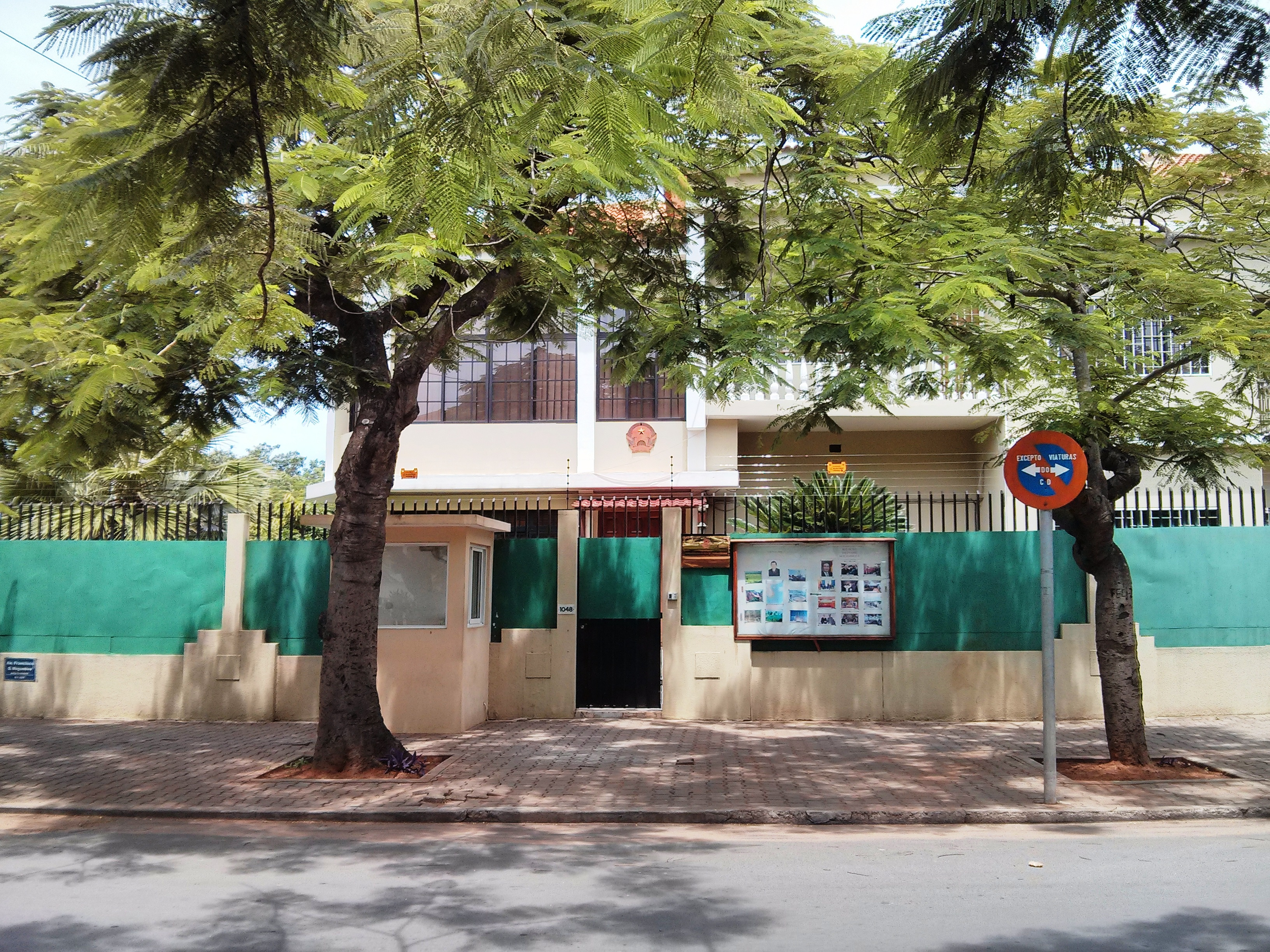
Embassy of Vietnam

== Consular missions ==
The cities of Beira and Tete are host to career consular missions. All entries are consulates-general unless indicated otherwise.

=== Beira, Sofala Province ===
1. Portugal
2. Zimbabwe

=== Tete, Tete Province ===
1. Malawi

== Non-resident embassies/high commissions ==
=== Resident in Luanda, Angola ===
1. Cape Verde
2. Hungary
3. Israel
4. Ivory Coast
5. São Tomé and Príncipe

=== Resident in Pretoria, South Africa ===
1. Australia
2. Austria
3. Azerbaijan
4. Bangladesh
5. Belgium
6. Bulgaria
7. Burkina Faso
8. Burundi
9. Cameroon
10. Central African Republic
11. Chile
12. Colombia
13. Croatia
14. Cyprus
15. Czechia
16. Denmark
17. Ecuador
18. Eritrea
19. Ethiopia
20. Gabon
21. Gambia
22. Georgia
23. Greece
24. Guinea
25. Iran
26. Jamaica
27. Kazakhstan
28. Kuwait
29. Lesotho
30. Lebanon
31. Liberia
32. Lithuania
33. Madagascar
34. Malaysia
35. Mali
36. Mauritania
37. Mexico
38. Namibia
39. Nepal
40. New Zealand
41. Niger
42. North Korea
43. Oman
44. Pakistan
45. Paraguay
46. Peru
47. Philippines
48. Poland
49. Romania
50. Senegal
51. Serbia
52. Seychelles
53. Slovakia
54. Somalia
55. Sri Lanka
56. Togo
57. Trinidad and Tobago
58. Tunisia
59. Uruguay

=== Resident elsewhere ===
1. Belarus (Harare)
2. Ghana (Harare)
3. Guatemala (London)
4. Mongolia (Cairo)
5. Qatar (Mbabane)
6. Republic of China (Taiwan) (Mbabane)
7. Sierra Leone (Addis Ababa)
8. Uganda (Dar es Salaam)
9. Yemen (Addis Ababa)

== Closed missions ==
Host city	Sending country	Mission	Year closed	Ref.
Maputo	Cape Verde	Embassy	2005	
Maputo	Denmark	Embassy	2017	
Maputo	Iceland	Embassy	Unknown	
Maputo	Iran	Embassy	Unknown	
Maputo	Nicaragua	Embassy	Unknown	
Maputo	North Korea	Embassy	1995	
Maputo	Romania	Embassy	1999	
Maputo	Somalia	Embassy	Unknown	
Maputo	Sudan	Embassy	2021	

== See also ==
- Foreign relations of Mozambique
- List of diplomatic missions of Mozambique
- Visa policy of Mozambique
- Visa requirements for Mozambican citizens
