= Bilhete de Identidade =

Bilhete de Identidade (Portuguese for "identity ticket") may refer to:

- Bilhete de Identidade de Residente (Macau)
- Bilhete de identidade (Mozambique)
- Bilhete de Identidade (Portugal)
