= Mozambican passport =

Passport issued to citizens of Mozambique

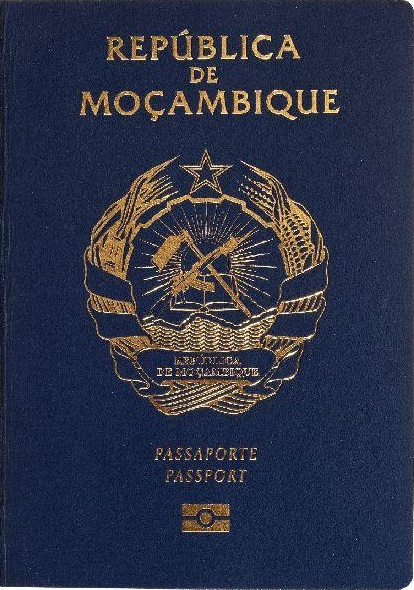
- Mozambican biometric passport cover
- Type: Passport
- Issued by: Mozambique
- Purpose: Identification
- Eligibility: Mozambican citizenship

The Mozambican passport is issued to citizens of Mozambique for international travel. In 2016, Mozambican passport holders had visa-free or visa on arrival access to 51 countries and territories.

== Visa requirements ==
Countries and territories with visa-free entries or visas on arrival for holders of regular Mozambican passports. Mozambique Visa not required Visa on arrival eVisa Visa available both on arrival or online Visa required prior to arrival

== See also ==
- List of passports
- Mozambican national ID card
- Visa requirements for Mozambican citizens
