= List of diplomatic missions of Mozambique =

This is a list of diplomatic missions of Mozambique, excluding honorary consulates. Mozambique is the only former Portuguese colony to be part of the Commonwealth of Nations, and thus has High Commissions in the capitals of its fellow member-states.

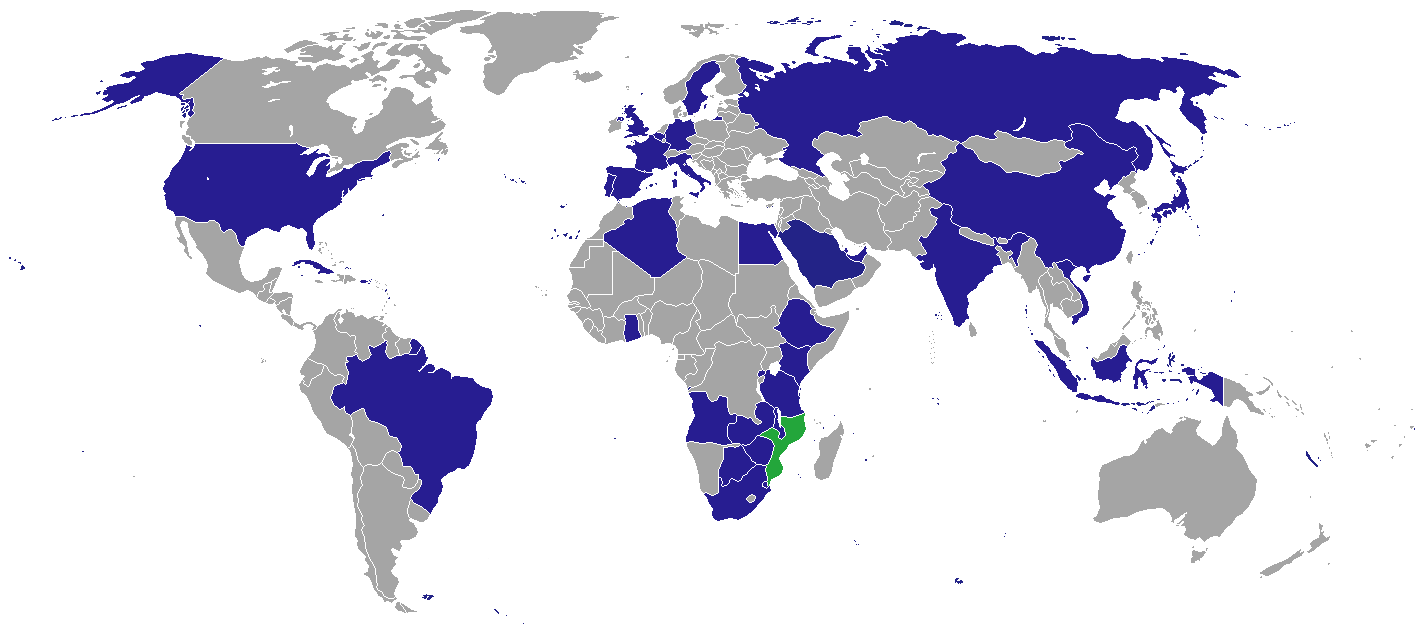
Map of Mozambican diplomatic missions

== Africa ==
Host country	Host city	Mission	Concurrent accreditation	Ref.
Algeria	Algiers	Embassy	Countries: Sahrawi Republic	
Angola	Luanda	Embassy	Countries: São Tomé and Principe	
Botswana	Gaborone	High Commission	International Organizations: Southern African Development Community	
Egypt	Cairo	Embassy	Countries: Libya; Morocco; Tunisia	
Eswatini	Mbabane	High Commission		
Ethiopia	Addis Ababa	Embassy	International Organizations: African Union	
Ghana	Accra	High Commission		
Kenya	Nairobi	High Commission	Countries: Uganda; International Organizations: United Nations; United Nations Environment Programme; United Nations Human Settlements Programme	
Malawi	Lilongwe	High Commission		
Malawi	Blantyre	Consulate-General		
Rwanda	Kigali	High Commission		
South Africa	Pretoria	High Commission	Countries: Lesotho; Madagascar; Mauritius; Namibia; Seychelles	
South Africa	Cape Town	Consulate-General	Countries: Lesotho; Madagascar; Mauritius; Namibia; Seychelles	
South Africa	Johannesburg	Consulate-General	Countries: Lesotho; Madagascar; Mauritius; Namibia; Seychelles	
South Africa	Mbombela	Consulate-General	Countries: Lesotho; Madagascar; Mauritius; Namibia; Seychelles	
Tanzania	Dar es Salaam	High Commission	Countries: Burundi	
Tanzania	Zanzibar City	Consulate-General	Countries: Burundi	
Zambia	Lusaka	High Commission		
Zimbabwe	Harare	Embassy		
Zimbabwe	Mutare	Consulate-General		

== Americas ==
Host country	Host city	Mission	Concurrent accreditation	Ref.
Brazil	Brasília	Embassy	Countries: Argentina; Chile; Colombia; Paraguay; Uruguay; Venezuela	
Cuba	Havana	Embassy		
United States	Washington, D.C.	Embassy	Countries: Canada	

== Asia ==
Host country	Host city	Mission	Concurrent accreditation	Ref.
China	Beijing	Embassy	Countries: North Korea	
China	Macau	Consulate-General	Countries: North Korea	
India	New Delhi	High Commission	Countries: Nepal; Sri Lanka	
Indonesia	Jakarta	Embassy	Countries: Brunei; Malaysia; Philippines; Singapore; Thailand; Timor-Leste	
Japan	Tokyo	Embassy	Countries: Australia; New Zealand; South Korea	
Qatar	Doha	Embassy		
Saudi Arabia	Riyadh	Embassy	International Organizations: Organisation of Islamic Cooperation	
United Arab Emirates	Abu Dhabi	Embassy	International Organizations: International Renewable Energy Agency	
United Arab Emirates	Dubai	Consulate-General	International Organizations: International Renewable Energy Agency	
Vietnam	Hanoi	Embassy		

== Europe ==
Host country	Host city	Mission	Concurrent accreditation	Ref.
Belgium	Brussels	Embassy	Countries: Luxembourg; Netherlands; International Organizations: European Union; Organisation for the Prohibition of Chemical Weapons	
France	Paris	Embassy	Countries: Monaco; International Organizations: UNESCO	
Germany	Berlin	Embassy	Countries: Austria; Czechia; Hungary; Poland	
Holy See (Note: The Mozambican Embassy to the Holy See is located outside Vatican territory in Rome.)	Rome	Embassy		
Italy	Rome	Embassy	Countries: Greece; Malta; Turkey; International Organizations: Food and Agriculture Organization; International Fund for Agricultural Development; World Food Programme	
Portugal	Lisbon	Embassy		
Portugal	Porto	Consulate-General		
Russia	Moscow	Embassy	Countries: Belarus; Bulgaria; Ukraine	
Spain	Madrid	Embassy	International Organizations: World Tourism Organization	
Sweden	Stockholm	Embassy	Countries: Denmark; Finland; Iceland; Norway	
United Kingdom	London	High Commission	Countries: Ireland; International Organizations: International Maritime Organization	

== Multilateral organizations ==
Organization	Host city	Host country	Mission	Concurrent accreditation	Ref.
CPLP	Lisbon	Portugal	Permanent Mission		
United Nations	New York City	United States	Permanent Mission	Countries: Guatemala; Trinidad and Tobago	
United Nations	Geneva	Switzerland	Permanent Mission	Countries: Switzerland; International Organizations: International Organization for Migration; UNIDO; World Health Organization; World Trade Organization	

== Gallery ==
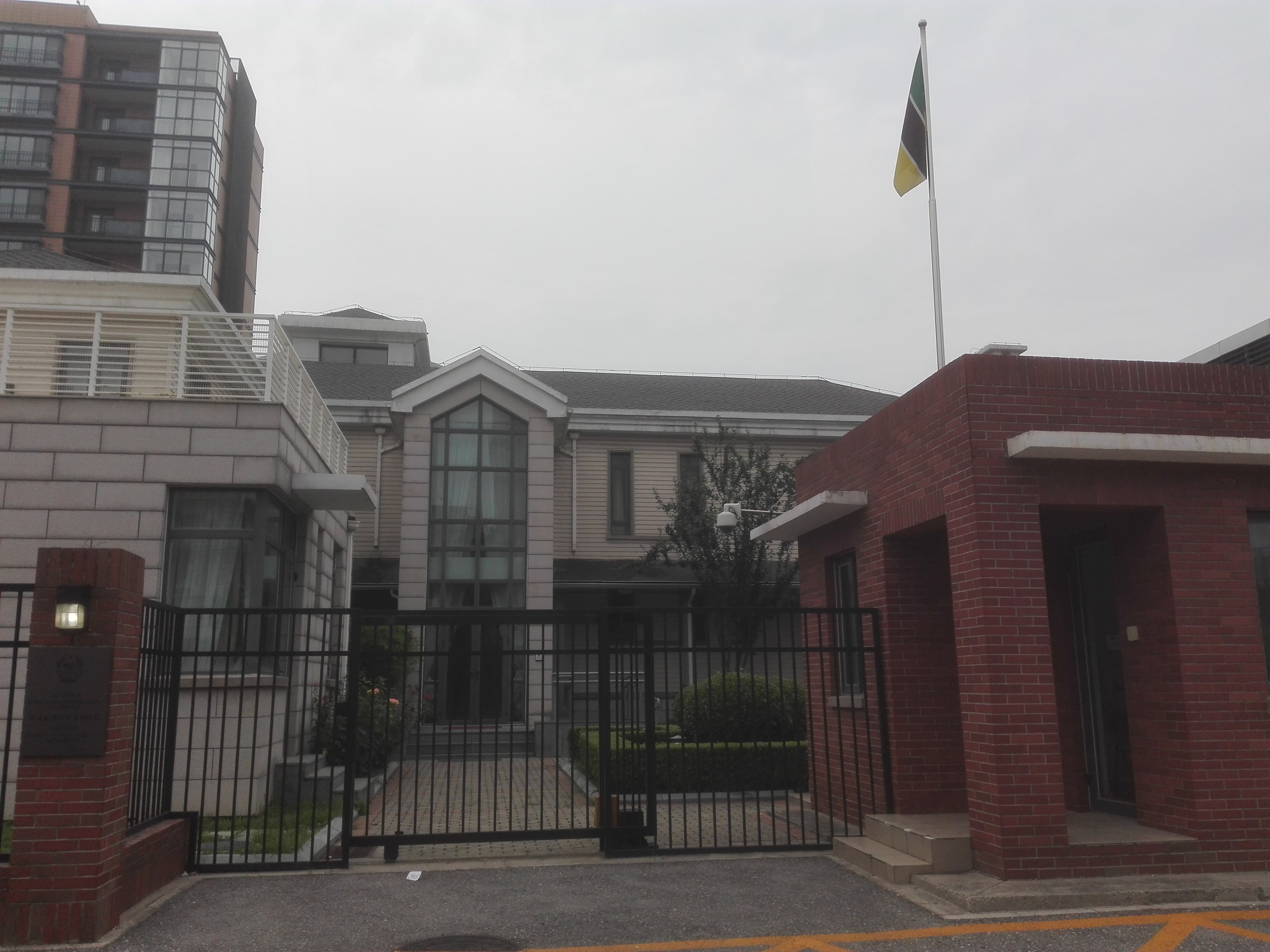
Embassy in Beijing

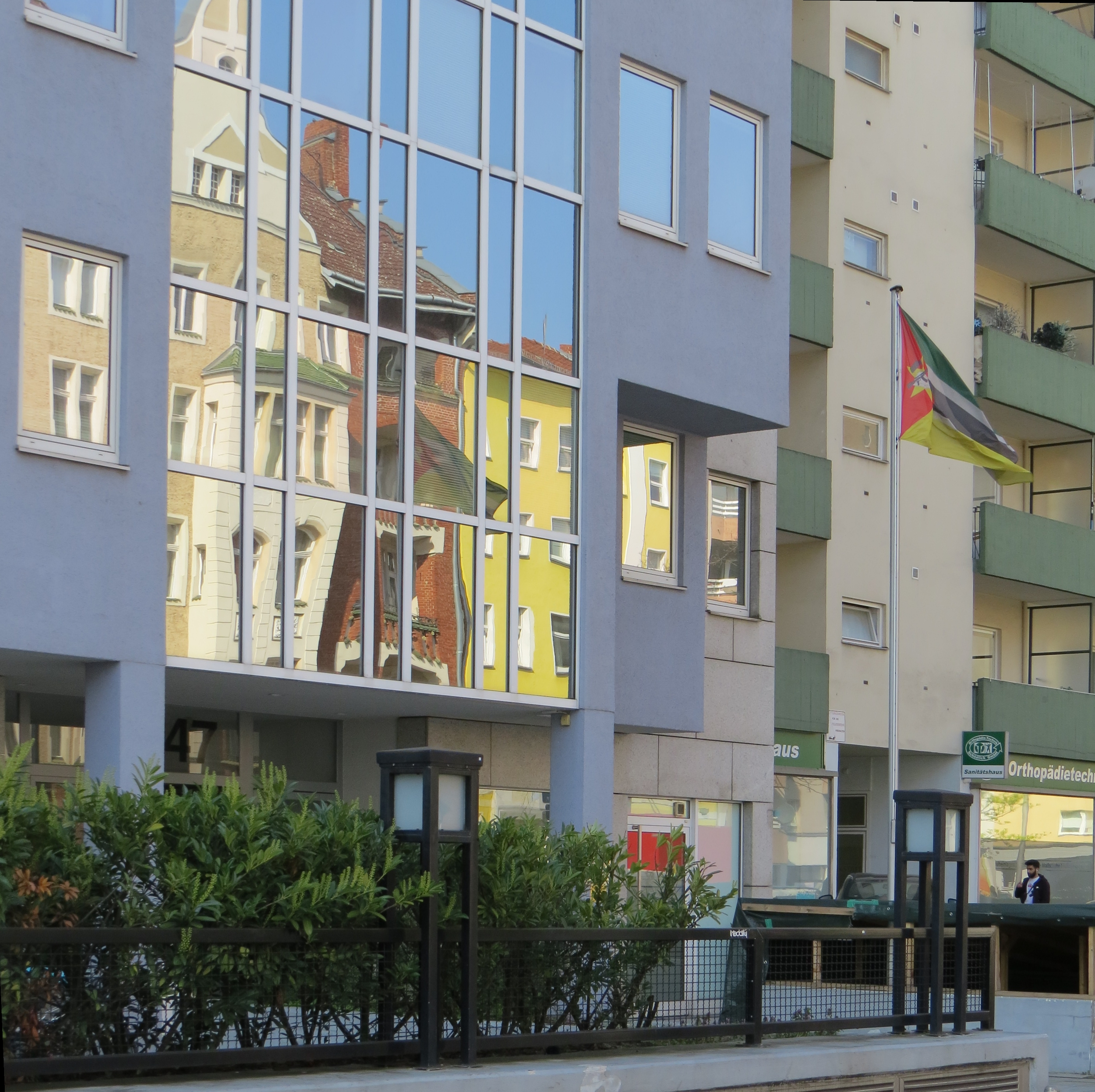
Embassy in Berlin

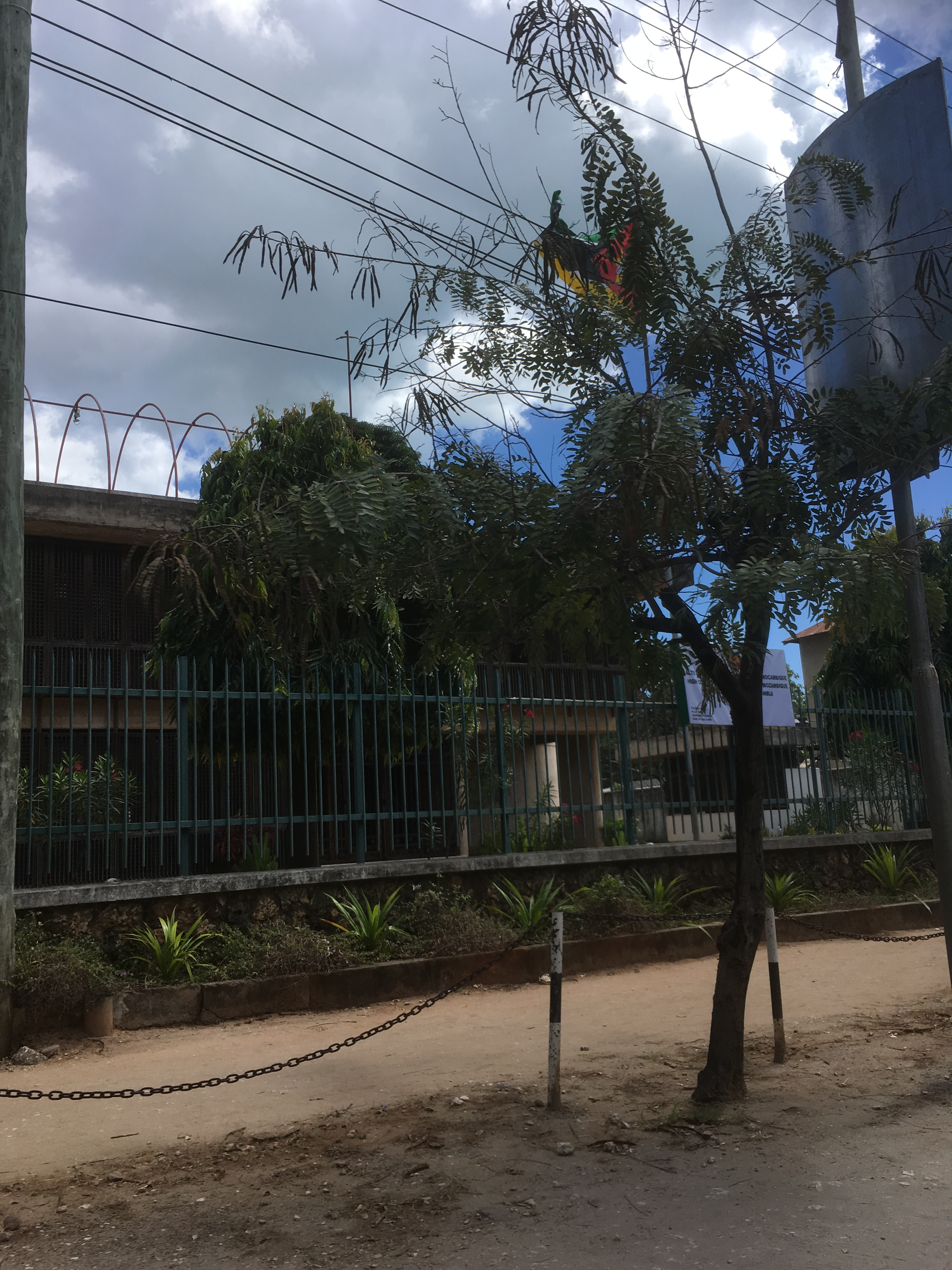
High Commission in Dar es Salaam

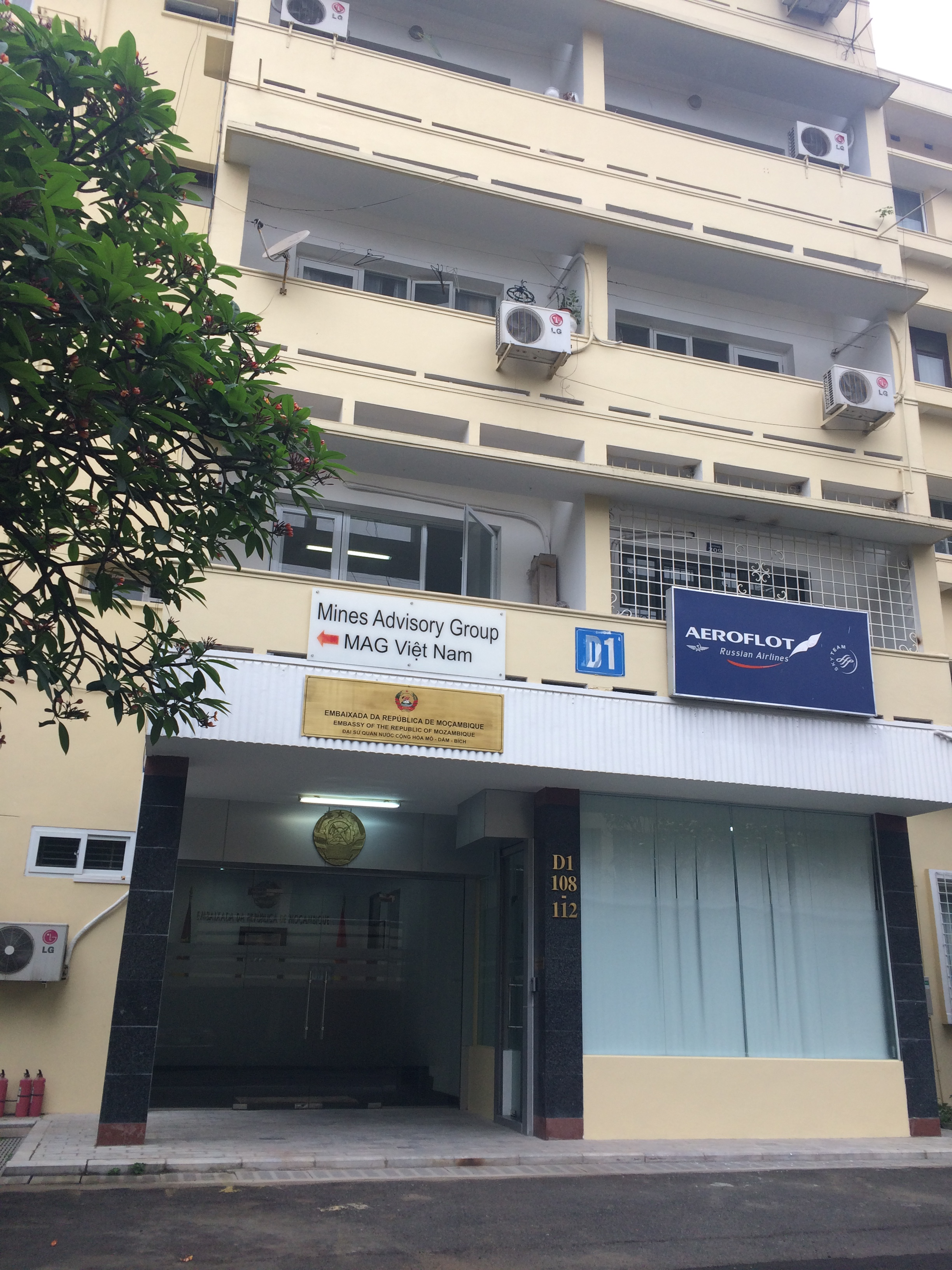
Building hosting the embassy in Hanoi

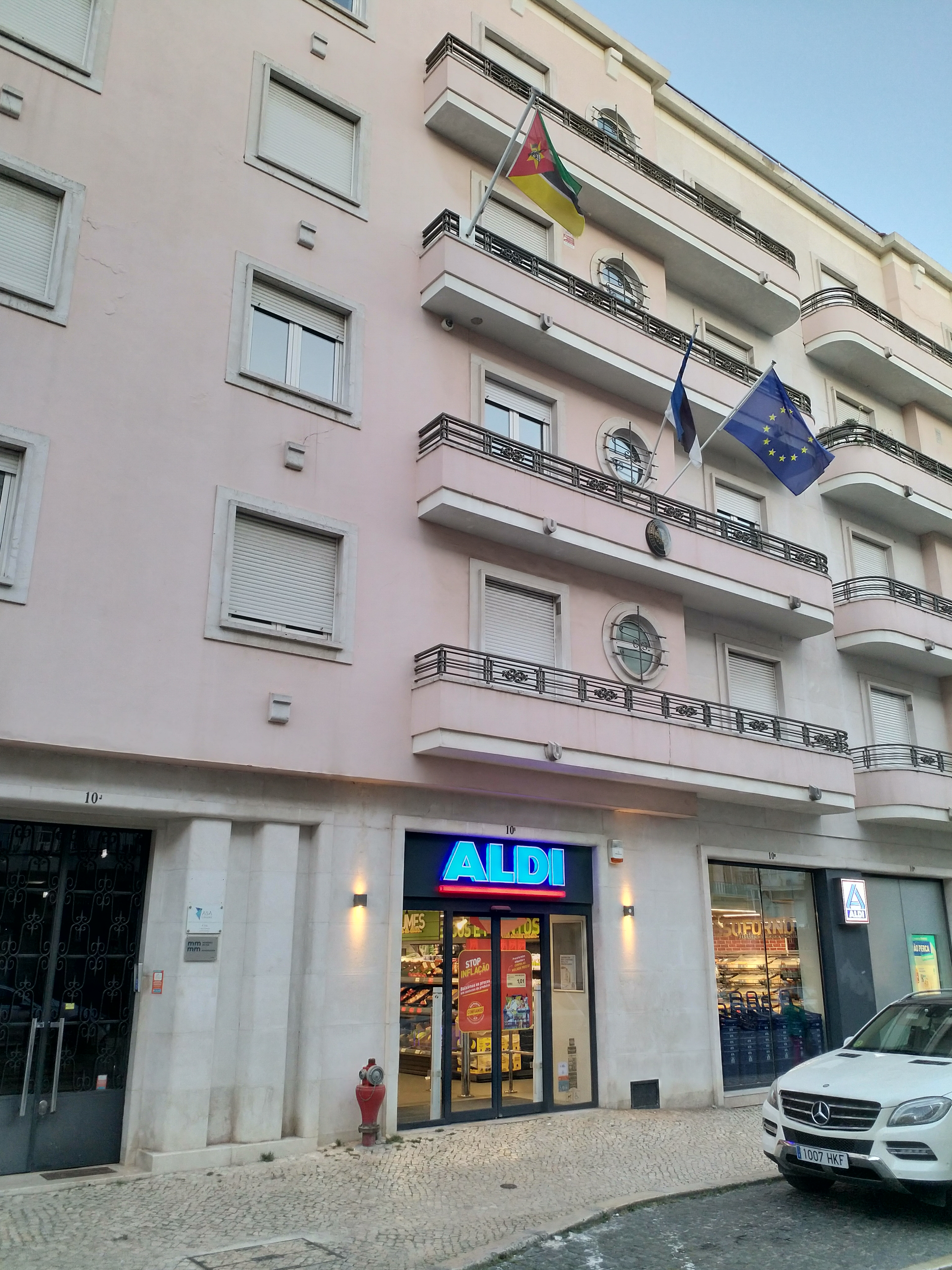
Embassy in Lisbon

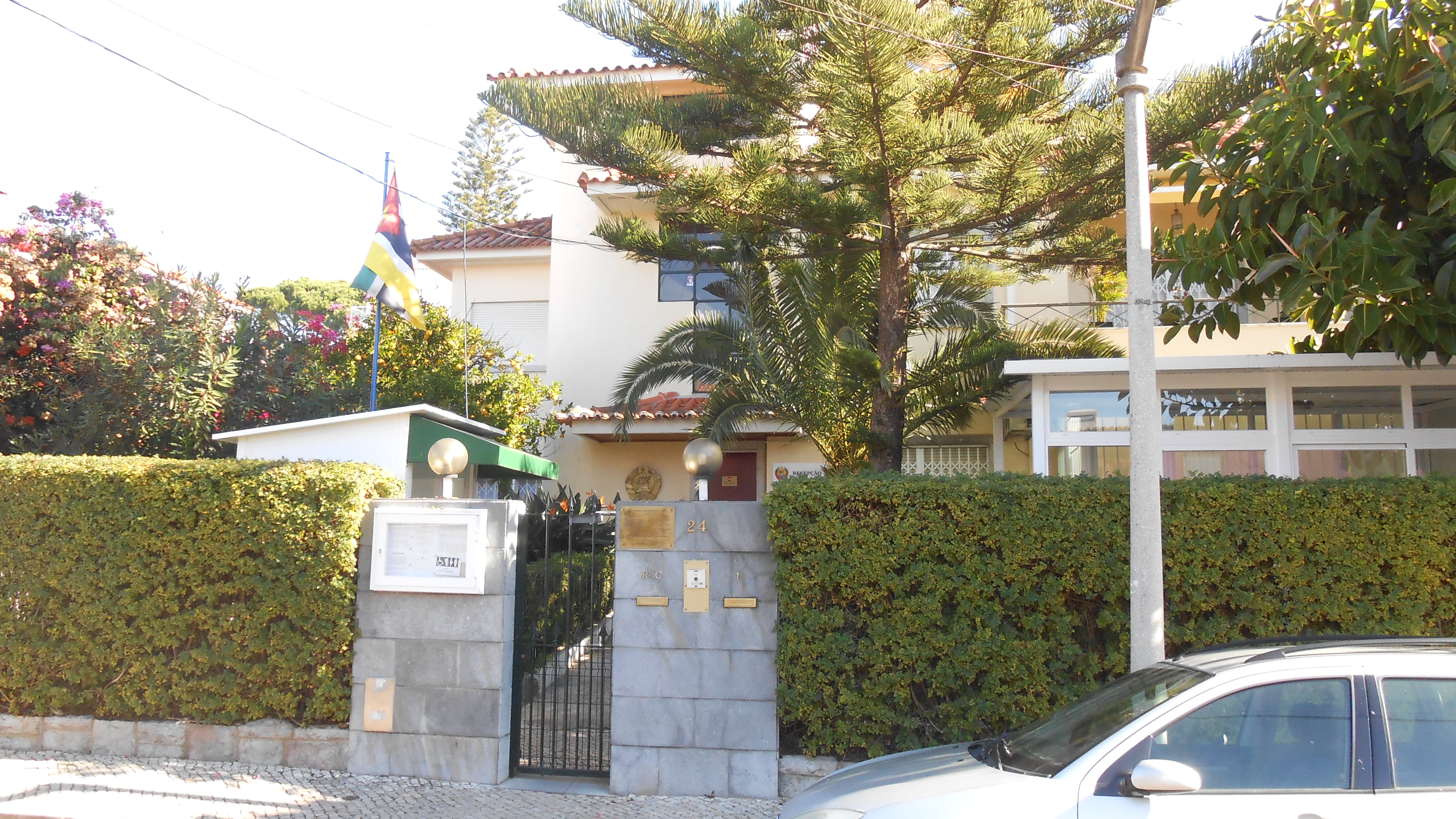
Embassy in Lisbon (Consular section)

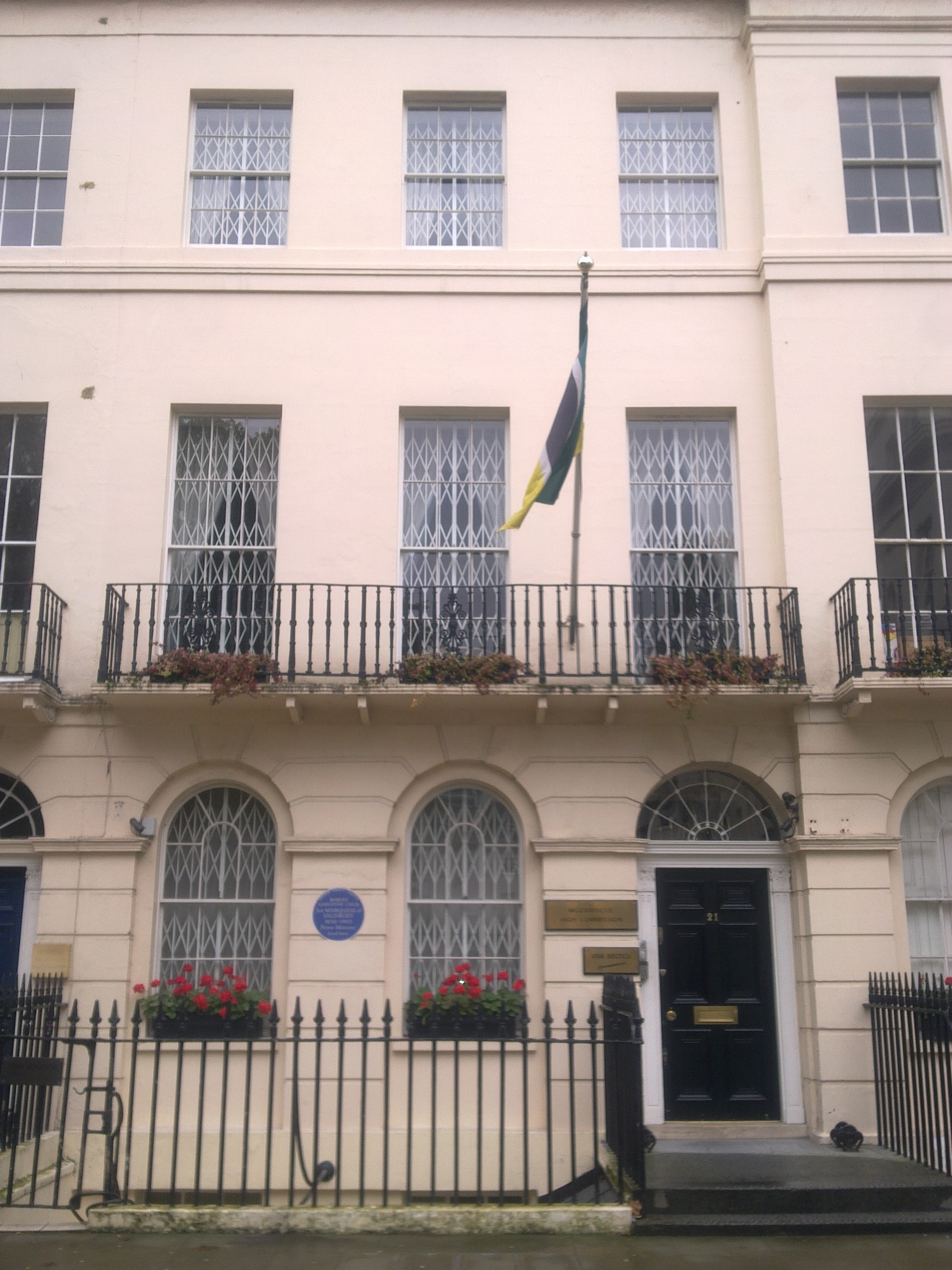
High Commission in London

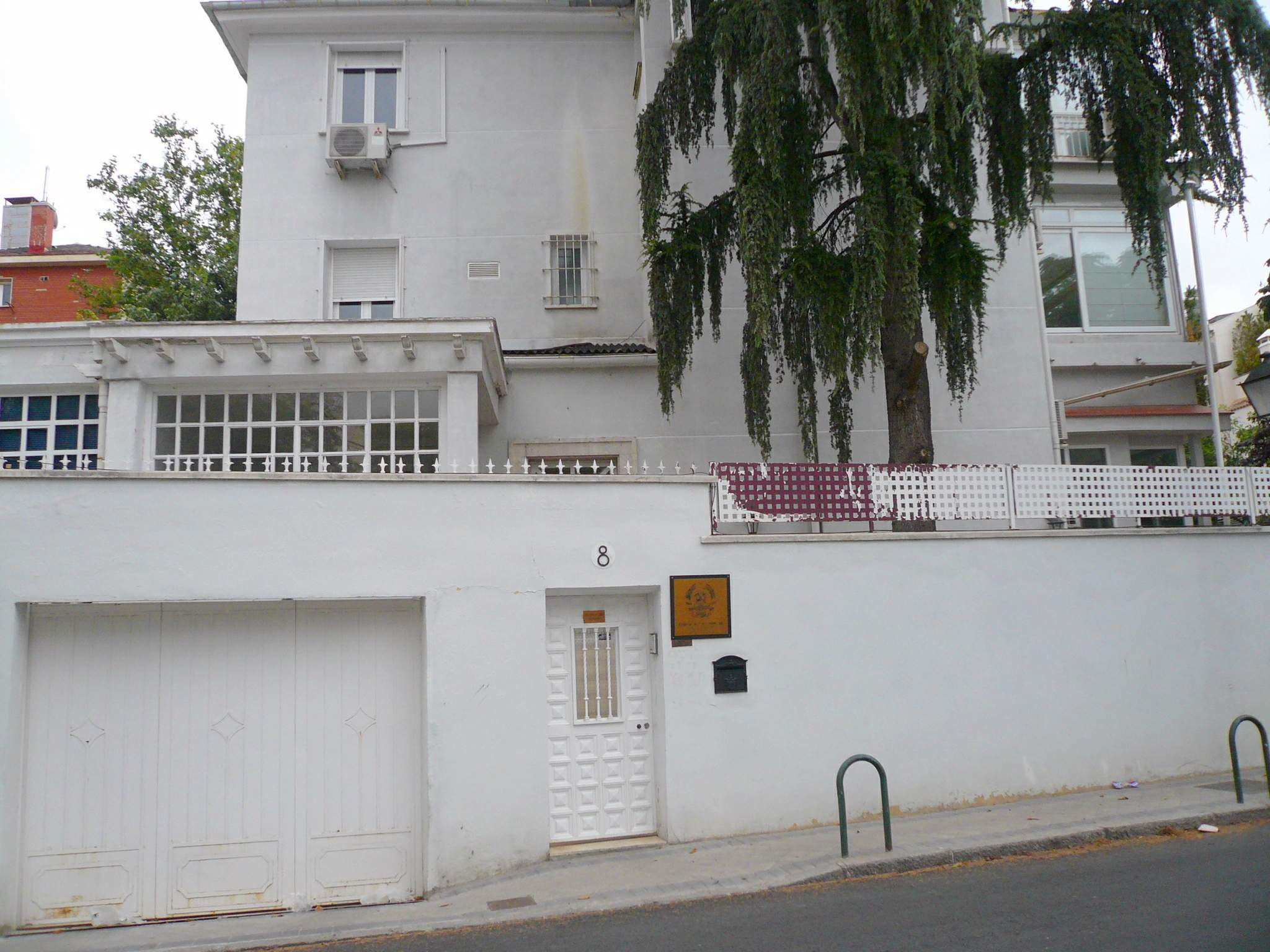
Embassy in Madrid

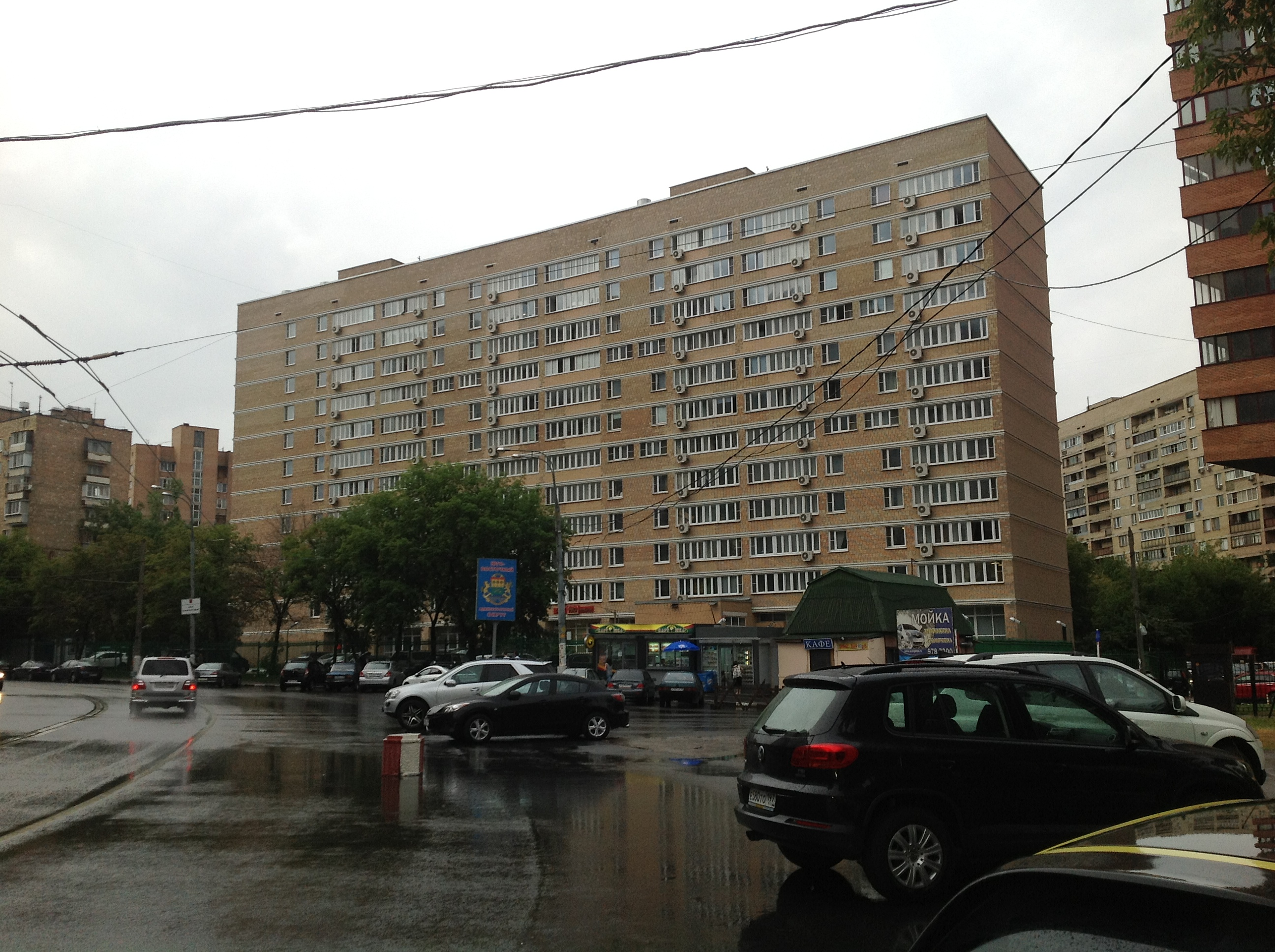
Building hosting the embassy in Moscow

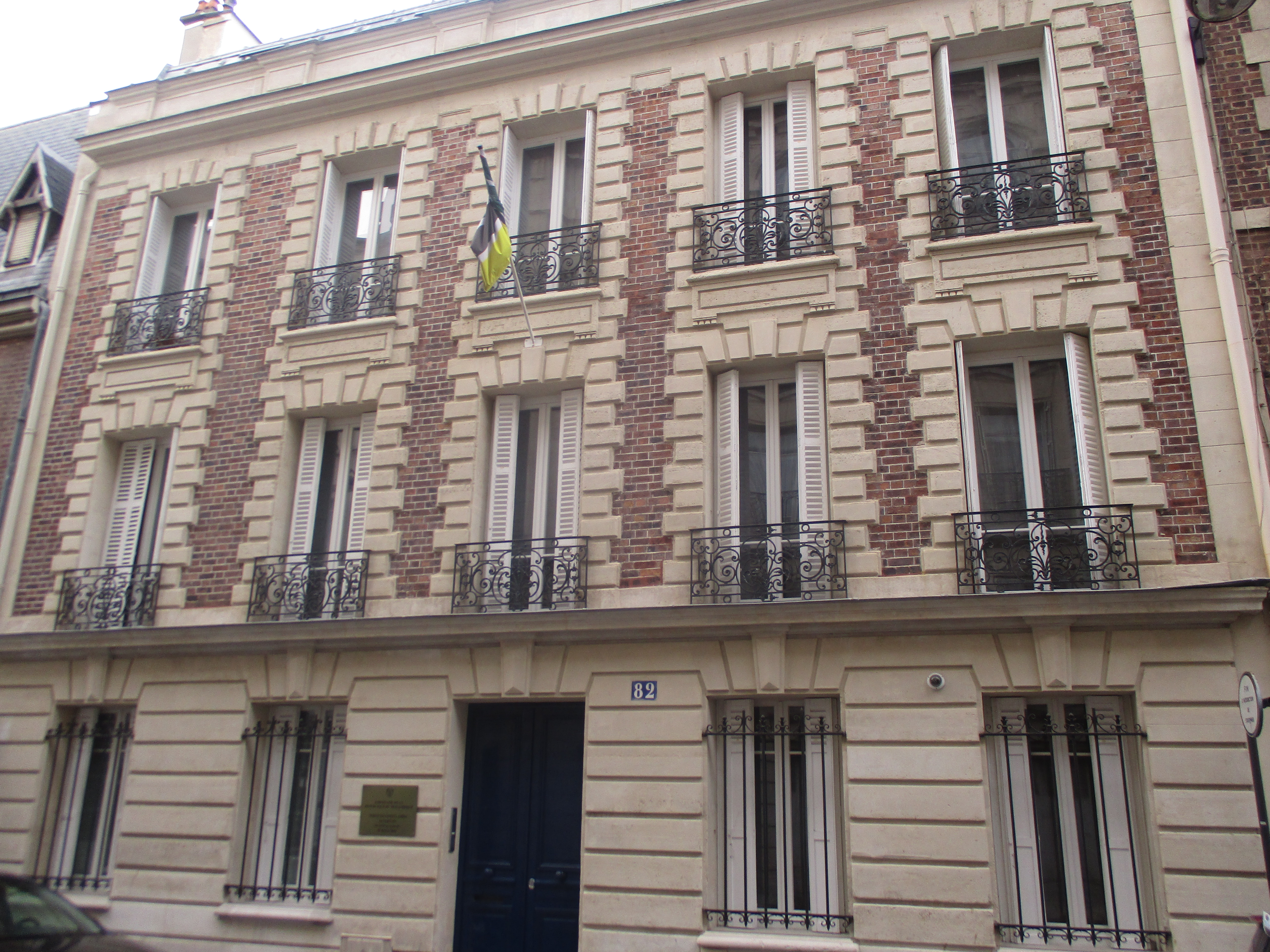
Embassy in Paris

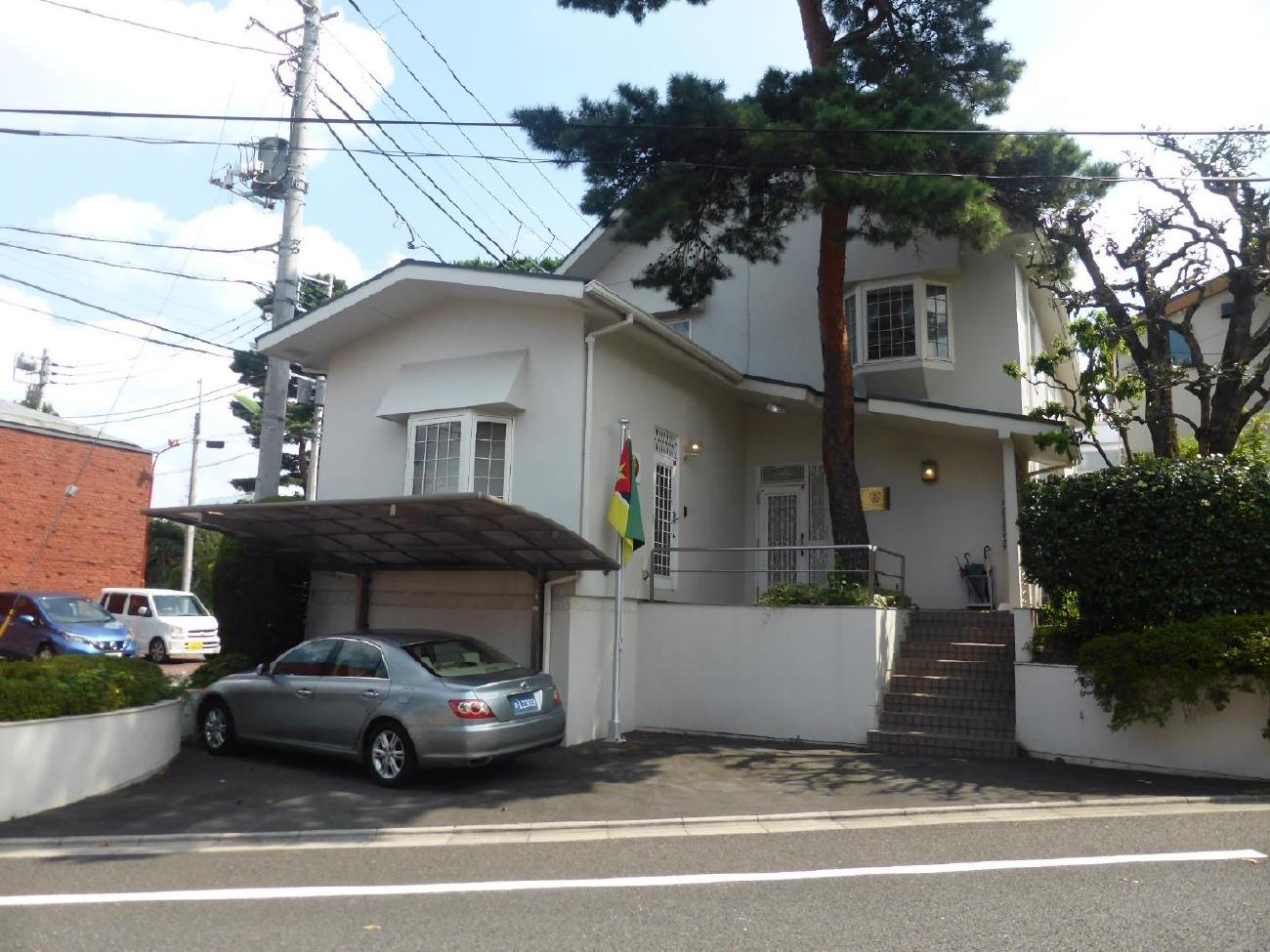
Embassy in Tokyo

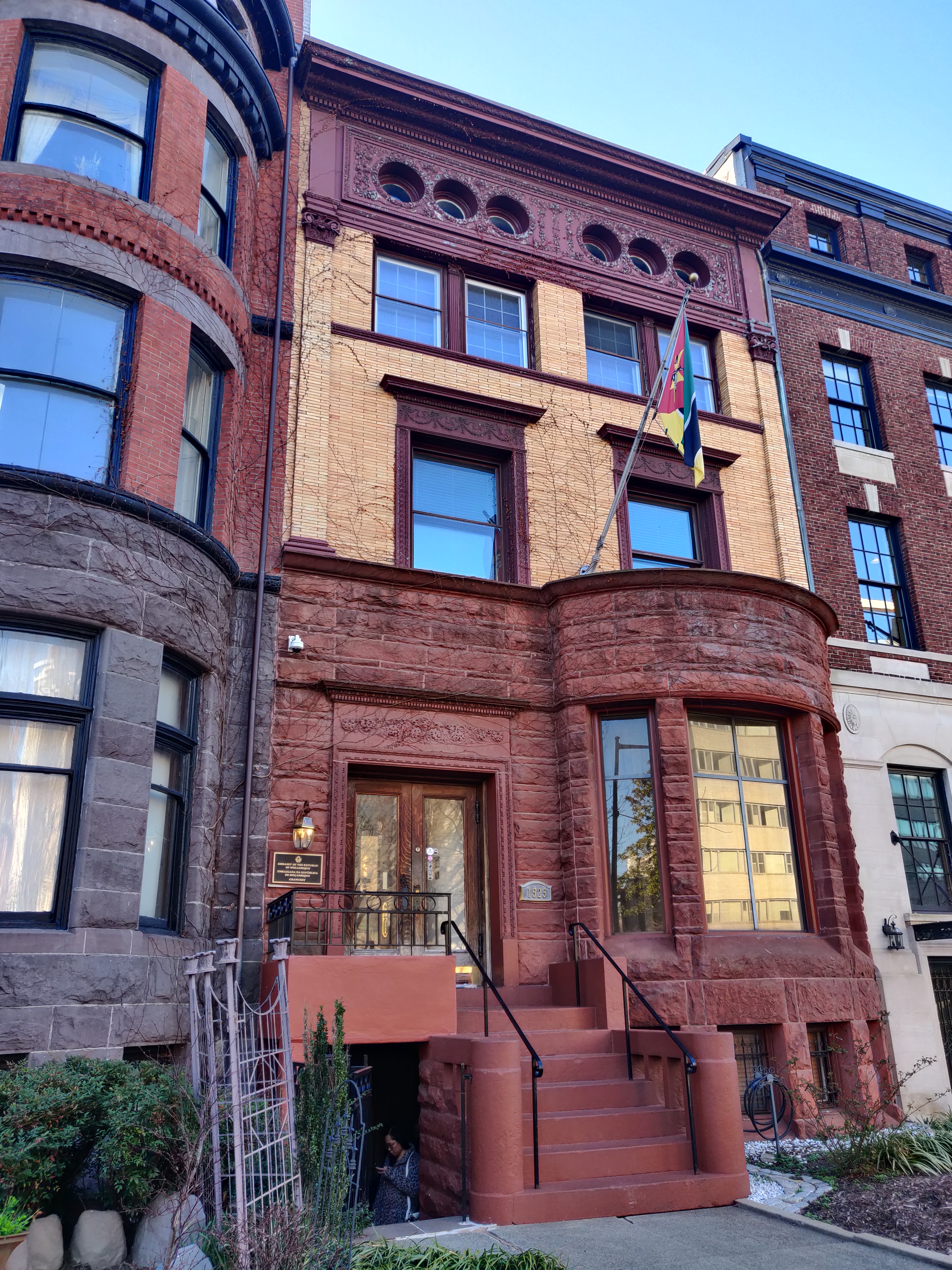
Embassy in Washington, D.C.

== Missions to open ==
Host country	Host city	Mission	Ref.
China	Guangzhou	Consulate-General	
Equatorial Guinea	Malabo	Embassy	
South Korea	Seoul	Embassy	
Turkey	Ankara	Embassy	

== See also ==
- Foreign relations of Mozambique
- List of diplomatic missions in Mozambique
- Visa policy of Mozambique
