= Bilhete de identidade (Mozambique) =

National identity card of Mozambique

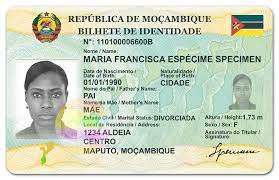
- Type: National identification card
- Issued by: Mozambique
- Size: 10.5 cm x 7.2 cm

The Bilhete de identidade (English: Identity Card), commonly abbreviated to BI, is the national identity card of Mozambique.

== Application ==
New applications for a BI require a valid birth certificate and photo. If renewing a BI within six months of expiry a birth certificate is not required, just the old card and new photo. If replacing a lost/stolen/expired BI, a new application must be made and so both a birth certificate and photo are required.

== Description ==
The BI is a 10.5 cm x 7.2 cm laminated card, embossed with an issuing seal. It is titled with República de Moçambique (English: Republic of Mozambique) with the national seal. It includes the following information about the card holder:

- Photograph
- Finger Print
- Identification Number
- Full Name
- Sex
- Nationality
- Date of Birth
- Place and Date of Issue
- Expiration Date
- Height
- Occupation
- Marital Status
- Address
- Signature

== See also ==
- Politics of Mozambique
- Mozambican passport
