= Visa policy of Mozambique =

Policy on permits required to enter Mozambique

Mozambique allows most countries that are not visa exempt to obtain a visa on arrival. However, nationals of certain countries must obtain a visa online or from one of the Mozambican diplomatic missions around the world before being allowed into the country.

Mozambique is part of the Southern African Development Community, meaning that members of most other SADC countries do not require a tourist visa if visiting Mozambique for tourism purposes.

== Visa policy map ==
Visa policy of Mozambique Mozambique Visa not required (3 months) Visa not required (30 days) Electronic Travel Authorization (30 days) Visa on arrival / eVisa eVisa Visa required

== Visa exemption ==
Citizens of the following countries do not need a visa to enter Mozambique for a stay up to the duration listed below:

3 months

- Botswana
- Kenya
- Rwanda
- Tanzania

30 days

- Angola
- Cape Verde
- Eswatini
- Lesotho
- Malawi
- Mauritius
- Namibia
- São Tomé and Principe
- Seychelles
- South Africa
- Zambia
- Zimbabwe
- Uganda

Date of visa changes
- 29 April 2005: South Africa
- 5 October 2013: Argentina (diplomatic and official passports)
- 4 September 2025: Uganda

=== Non-ordinary passports ===
Holders of diplomatic and official, service or special passports of the following countries may enter without a visa:

- Angola^{P}
- Argentina
- Botswana
- Brazil^{D P}
- Cape Verde^{P}
- China
- Cuba^{D P}
- Eswatini
- Guinea Bissau^{P}
- India
- Indonesia
- Lesotho
- Malawi
- Mauritius
- Namibia^{P}
- Portugal^{P}
- Russia
- São Tomé and Príncipe^{P}
- Seychelles
- South Africa
- South Korea
- Tanzania
- Thailand
- Turkey
- Zambia
- Zimbabwe

_{D - Diplomatic passports only.}
_{P - Community of Portuguese Language Countries.}

== Electronic Travel Authorisation ==
Since 1 May 2023, the following nationals can obtain an ETA to enter Mozambique for 30 days by paying a tax fee of 48 USD. In addition, an extension of 30 days is possible:

30 days

- Belgium
- Canada
- China
- Côte d'Ivoire
- Denmark
- Finland
- France
- Germany
- Ghana
- Indonesia
- Ireland
- Israel
- Italy
- Japan
- Netherlands
- Norway
- Portugal
- Russia
- Saudi Arabia
- Senegal
- Singapore
- South Korea
- Spain
- Sweden
- Switzerland
- Ukraine
- United Arab Emirates
- United Kingdom
- United States

== Visa on arrival ==
Citizens of all other countries that are not visa exempt can obtain a visa on arrival in Mozambique, valid for a maximum stay of 30 days at all border posts, if they present a passport valid for 6 months on arrival and a return or onward ticket, as well as proof of sufficient funds to support their stay and proof of the purpose of their visit. A visa obtained on arrival costs 50 USD, which is significantly cheaper than an eVisa.

Despite visas stating they are valid for only 1 entry, visitors who have travelled to Eswatini and South Africa have found it was valid for 2 entries if the visa was still within its 30 day validity.

According to Timatic and the Henry & Partners and the Passport Index, visa on arrival is not available to citizens of the following countries:

- Bangladesh
- Eritrea
- India
- Pakistan
- Somalia
- Sri Lanka

However, citizens of these countries may obtain a visa on arrival if they hold a printed confirmation from the Immigration Authority (SENAMI) Headquarters in Maputo, indicating that a visa has been approved before departure and travel for the Rovuma Basin Project.

== Electronic visa (e-Visa) ==
In December 2022, the Mozambique e-Visa system began operations. Citizens of all countries that are not visa-exempt can also apply for an e-Visa prior to entering Mozambique.

The official e-Visa website offers all types of visas, such as tourist, sports and business visas. The cost of the Tourist e-Visa is 6,250 MT for 30 days, 12,504 MT for 60 days, and 18,756.25 MT for 90 days.

Citizens of the following countries cannot apply for an e-Visa and must apply for a visa at the nearest Mozambican embassy.

- Bangladesh
- Ethiopia
- Nepal
- Nigeria
- Pakistan
- Somalia

== See also ==
- Visa requirements for Mozambican citizens
- List of diplomatic missions of Mozambique
