= Mozambican nationality law =

Mozambican Nationality Law

Mozambique National Assembly
- Long title: Lei da Nacionalidade de 20 de Junho de 1975 (amended by Lei No. 16/87 de 21 de Dezembro 1987)
- Enacted by: Government of Mozambique
- Status: Current legislation

Mozambican nationality law is regulated by the Constitution of Mozambique, as amended; the Nationality Law and Nationality Regulation, and their revisions; and various international agreements to which the country is a signatory. These laws determine who is, or is eligible to be, a national of Mozambique. The legal means to acquire nationality, formal legal membership in a nation, differ from the domestic relationship of rights and obligations between a national and the nation, known as citizenship. Nationality describes the relationship of an individual to the state under international law, whereas citizenship is the domestic relationship of an individual within the nation. Mozambican nationality is typically obtained under the principle of jus soli, i.e., by birth in the territory, or jus sanguinis, i.e., by birth in Mozambique or abroad to parents with Mozambican nationality. It can be granted to persons with an affiliation to the country, or to a permanent resident who has lived in the country for a given period of time through naturalization.

== Acquiring Mozambican nationality ==
Nationality can be obtained in Mozambique at birth or later in life through naturalization.

=== By birth ===
Typically, in Mozambique, a combination of jus sanguinis and jus soli is used to determine nationality at birth. Those who are eligible include:

- Persons born anywhere who have at least one parent who was also born in Mozambique, as long as the parents do not have diplomatic immunity; (Note: Persons born abroad, must follow an administrative registration process to acquire nationality. Also, unless their parents were employed in state service, they are required to make a declaration that they wish to retain Mozambican nationality within one year of attaining majority.)
- Foundlings or orphans, with no discernible evidence as to the nationality or identity of its parents; or
- Persons born in Mozambique who would otherwise be stateless.

=== By naturalization ===
Naturalization can be granted to persons who understand Portuguese or another dialect of the territory and have resided in Mozambique for a sufficient period of time to confirm they understand the customs and traditions of the country. General provisions are that applicants have good character, legal capacity, and the economic means to support themselves. Applicants must verify residency of a minimum of five years. (Note: The nationality statute requires ten years of residency, but the 2004 Constitution reduced the time period to five years.) Besides foreigners meeting the criteria, other persons who may apply for naturalization include:

- Children born in Mozambique to two foreign parents, even if one had diplomatic immunity, if they are still residing in Mozambique upon reaching the age of majority;
- The spouse of a Mozambican national typically after having been married for five years, but may apply immediately if the spouse is stateless; (Note: There is a conflict between the Nationality Law, which provides only for the wife of a Mozambican national to acquire nationality and the 2004 Constitution, which allows either spouse to acquire nationality from a Mozambican.)
- Children of a naturalized Mozambican;
- Adoptees of Mozambican nationals automatically acquire nationality upon completion of a legal adoption; or (Note: The 2004 Constitution provided for adoptees to gain nationality from their parents for the first time. There is a conflict in law as the constitutional provisions are different than those in the Nationality Law.)
- Persons who have provided service to the state may be able to naturalize without meeting language and residency requirements.

== Loss of nationality ==
Mozambicans are allowed to renounce their nationality, provided that they will not become stateless. Though the nationality law requires denaturalization for native citizens who perform actions, like voting, as if they were nationals of another country or for crimes committed against the state, the Constitution of 2004 makes no provisions for denaturalization. Persons who have previously lost their Mozambican naturalization may repatriate as long as they reside in the country and are able to integrate with the customs and traditions of the society.

== Dual nationality ==
Mozambique has allowed dual nationality in most cases since 2004. The main restriction on dual nationality is that the president must hold only Mozambican nationality.

== History ==
=== Portuguese colony (1498–1975) ===
What is known now as Mozambique was sighted by Portuguese explorer Vasco da Gama on his first voyage to India in 1498, though Sofala may have been visited clandestinely in 1490, by Pêro da Covilhã, who was seeking information on commerce and potential allies for John II of Portugal. In 1502, da Gama made a second voyage there, establishing a trading permit in exchange for payment of a tribute to the sheikh Isuf (also known as Yussuf) of Sofala. Permission was granted for the construction of a trading fort in Sofala in 1505 and that same year, Francisco de Almeida established a trading agreement with the Sultan of Kilwa to erect a trading house at Kilwa. By 1513, the Portuguese had abandoned Kilwa, but expanded their operations in an attempt to gain both a monopoly over trade and political supremacy in the region. Using their superior arms as well as patrolling warships, they destroyed the trading sites of their rivals and took control of the coastlines, while simultaneously exploring the interior of the territory. (Note: Portuguese Mozambique consisted of the government control of the southern third of the country. After the Berlin Conference held in 1884 and 1885, the administration of the remainder of the country was taken over by royal chartered companies, like the Mozambique Company (Companhia de Moçambique, 1888), Niassa Company (Companhia da Niassa, 1891), and the Zambezia Company (Companhia da Zambézia, 1892), which were given the right to monopolize the economy in exchange for keeping the areas pacified. The companies remained in control until the period between 1929 and 1941, when the Estado Novo regime reclaimed control from the charter companies.)

Under the Ordinances of Manuel I (Portuguese: Ordenações Manuelinas), compiled by Portugal in 1521, courts were given leeway to interpret common law and local custom in the territories without established High Courts. Nationals were defined as those born in Portuguese territory and leaving the territory without permission of the sovereign was grounds for denaturalization. In 1603, the Ordinances of Philip I (Portuguese: Ordenações Filipinas) established that Portuguese nationals were children born on the Iberian Peninsula or adjacent islands, Brazil, or to an official in service to the crown in the Portuguese possessions of Africa or Asia, whose father was a native of Portugal, or whose mother was a native of Portugal and whose father was a foreigner who had established domicile in Portugal for a minimum of ten years. Those who were not in service to the crown in the colonies (except Brazil) were not considered to be Portuguese. A child could not derive nationality directly from its mother unless it was illegitimate.

The first Constitution of Portugal, drafted in 1822, defined subjects of the Portuguese crown as the children of a male, native to any of the territories of the kingdom. The nationality scheme laid out in 1603 remained mostly unchanged except for some clarifications, such as legitimate children of a Portuguese father or illegitimate children of a Portuguese mother born abroad could be nationals if they resided in Portugal and children born to a Portuguese mother and foreign father could only derive Portuguese nationality upon reaching their majority and requesting it. Two new provisions included that foundlings discovered on Portuguese soil were considered nationals, as were freedmen. Naturalization was only available to foreign men who married Portuguese women, and only if they had investments in the country or provided service to the crown. Denaturalization resulted from service to, or receiving benefits from, a foreign government, or obtaining another nationality. A new constitution was adopted in 1826 (which was in force from 1826 to 1828, 1834 to 1836, and 1842 to 1910), which granted nationality to anyone born on Portuguese soil. Birth by descent was accepted as establishing nationality, as long as the father lived in Portugal or was abroad in service to the monarch. Provisions stipulated that only illegitimate children could derive nationality from their mother and established that a nationality law was to define provisions for naturalization.

The new nationality code was promulgated as the Decree of 22 October 1836, which established that grounds for naturalization included having reached majority, demonstrating adequate means of self-support, and having a minimum of two years residency, which could be waived if one had Portuguese ancestry. The Civil Code of 1867 reiterated similar nationality requirements to those that had previously been in effect, with the exception that a foreign woman, upon marriage to a Portuguese husband, automatically acquired Portuguese nationality. It also provided that Portuguese women who married foreigners lost their nationality, unless they would become stateless, and could not reacquire Portuguese status unless the marriage terminated and she lived in Portugal. It retained the provisions of the 1836 Decree for naturalization but increased residency to three years and added stipulations that applicants must have completed their military duties to their country of origin and that they have no criminal record. The Indigenous Code (Portuguese: código indígenato) of 1899, applied to all Portuguese colonies except Cape Verde and São Tomé and Príncipe. The nationality requirements remained stable and did not significantly change again until 1959, when a new Nationality Law (Lei n.º 2098) granted Portuguese nationality to anyone born in Martinique, unless the parents were foreign diplomats. Married women continued to derive their nationality from their husband, with the exception that a woman could retain her nationality of origin if she specifically declared she did not want to be Portuguese and could prove that her country of origin allowed retention of her nationality after marriage.

After the collapse of the Estado Novo dictatorship in Portugal in 1974 and following a lengthy struggle for independence of the colonies, Portugal agreed to begin the process of decolonization. By the Decree of 25 April 1974, the Portuguese Parliament created the African countries of Angola, Cape Verde, Guinea Bissau, Mozambique, and São Tomé e Principe. In July 1974, Portugal signed an agreement authorizing independence, if the populace agreed. The Mozambican War of Independence, which had begun in 1964, was terminated after signing the Lusaka Accord on 7 September 1974, paving the way for independence. The Accord did not contain provisions for nationality once independence was attained. In an attempt to settle the nationality question of those in the new countries, Portugal promulgated Decree-Law 308/75 on 24 June 1975. Under its terms, the legislation assumed that Mozambicans and others born in the colonies would become nationals of the new countries if they did not declare a preference to retain their Portuguese nationality. It proclaimed that those who would not lose Portuguese nationality at independence included only persons born in Portugal but living abroad and persons born abroad in the territory but who had established long-term ties with Portuguese culture by living in Portugal. No option was offered to other Portuguese nationals to retain their status and the automatic loss of nationality left many former colonial nationals stateless.

=== Post-independence (1975–present) ===
Mozambique officially became independent on 25 June 1975. Five days prior to independence, the Marxist Constitution of the Popular Republic of Mozambique and 1975 Nationality Law were accepted by the ruling party, the Liberation Front of Mozambique (Frente de Libertação de Moçambique, FRELIMO). Despite constitutional provisions for equality, under the Nationality Law, children could only obtain nationality maternally if their mother was a member of FRELIMO and had participated in the independence struggle. No such provision was required to obtain nationality through a father. Those who were domiciled in Mozambique at independence, or established a domicile there within 90 days of independence, were granted nationality, unless their parents were foreigners living in Mozambique as part of their service to a foreign government. Children born in the country to a parent who was born in Mozambique, or to unknown or stateless parents, acquired Mozambican nationality. Children born abroad could only acquire nationality paternally, unless their mother had worked in the independence movement. Foreign women who married Mozambican men acquired their nationality, but were required to renounce their other nationality upon marriage. Foreign men married to a Mozambican woman could not acquire nationality upon marriage, and if a Mozambican woman married a foreigner, she automatically lost her Mozambican nationality. The law barred dual nationality and required the loss of Mozambican nationality upon the acquisition of other nationality. On 16 August 1975, the Nationality Regulation (Decreto No. 3/75) was passed to specify implementation procedures for the Nationality Law.

The Nationality Law was amended on 6 April 1982 (Lei No. 2/82) to allow persons who had previously lost Mozambican nationality to repatriate if they returned to the country, established a domicile and could verify that they had reassimilated into the society. It was amended again on 21 December 1987 (Lei No. 16/87) to reduce gender discrimination. The amendment of that date, allowed children born abroad to acquire nationality through their mother; eliminated the requirement for women who married foreigners to automatically lose their Mozambican nationality; and provided a means for women who had previously lost their Mozambican nationality to reacquire it be renouncing any other nationality. In 1988, a clarification of the 1988 amendment was sent from the Ministry of Justice, confirming that women who had lost their nationality through marriage could repatriate by submitting a request to the Central Registry Office with proof they had not acquired their spouse's nationality, or with a renunciation of the spouse's nationality. All other persons wishing to repatriate who had lost nationality had to submit a request to the Minister of Interior, which would be evaluated by the Ministry of Foreign Affairs under the same guidelines as regular naturalization.

In 1990, the Constitution was rewritten, abandoning socialism and adopting a democratic model which included fundamental rights. It contained provisions for acquiring and losing nationality which did not differ substantially from the 1975 Nationality Law, as amended through 1987. Article 200 specified that the Constitution was to prevail should there be conflicting provisions in laws that remained in effect. The changes to the naturalization scheme were to increase residency to ten years, decrease the age of majority to eighteen years (which meant that children could only be naturalized automatically with a parent if unmarried and a minor), and add an obligation for the renunciation of other nationality. The remaining requirements of the 1975 Nationality Law for the acquisition of nationality remained in place. Loss of nationality was amended in 1990 to clarify that persons engaged in service to a foreign state could only lose their nationality if their service to the other country was a danger to Mozambique.

In 2004, a new constitution was promulgated, with an effective date of 21 January 2005. Under its terms, the 1975 Nationality Act, as amended through 1987, and the Nationality Regulation, as amended through 1988, remain in effect unless their provisions contradict those in the 2004 Constitution. Among the conflicting provisions are the recognition in the Nationality Law of those born in Mozambique during the colonial period who returned to the country within 90 days of independence, those who participated in the independence movement, and provisions for only the wife of a Mozambican national to acquire nationality. The requirement for persons to renounce other nationality to naturalize or repatriate, was stricken from the 2004 Constitution and adoptees were granted nationality upon completion of a legal adoption process. Acquisition of nationality in the 2004 constitution retains definitions for those who acquired nationality at independence as separate provisions from those who acquired nationality after independence. Though the United Nations High Commissioner for Refugees has recommended repealing or amending the Nationality Law and Nationality Regulations because of conflicting provisions, a 2012 attempt to update the statutes did not gain traction.
