= Ukrainian passport =

Passport issued to citizens of Ukraine

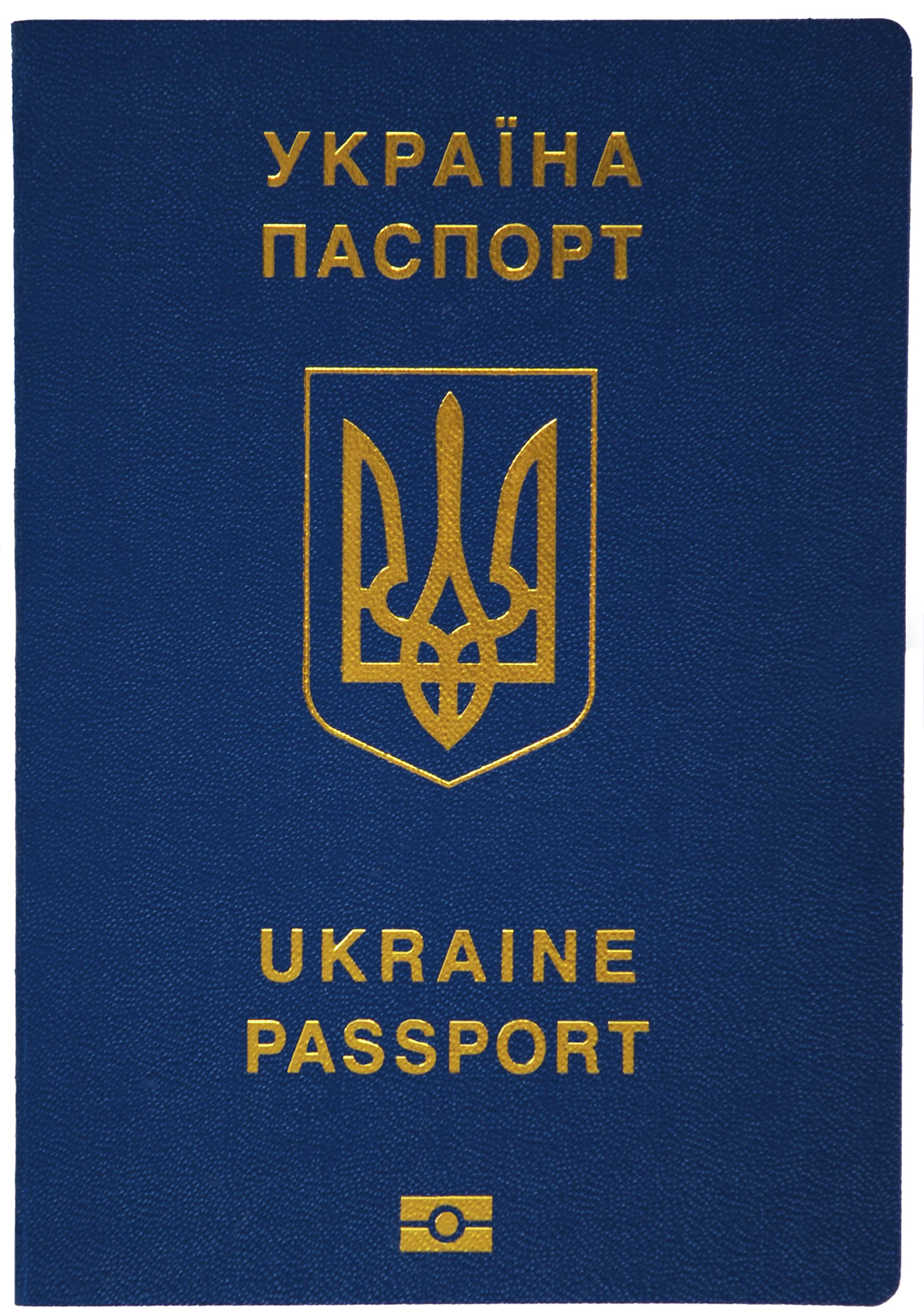
- The front cover of a current biometric Ukrainian passport

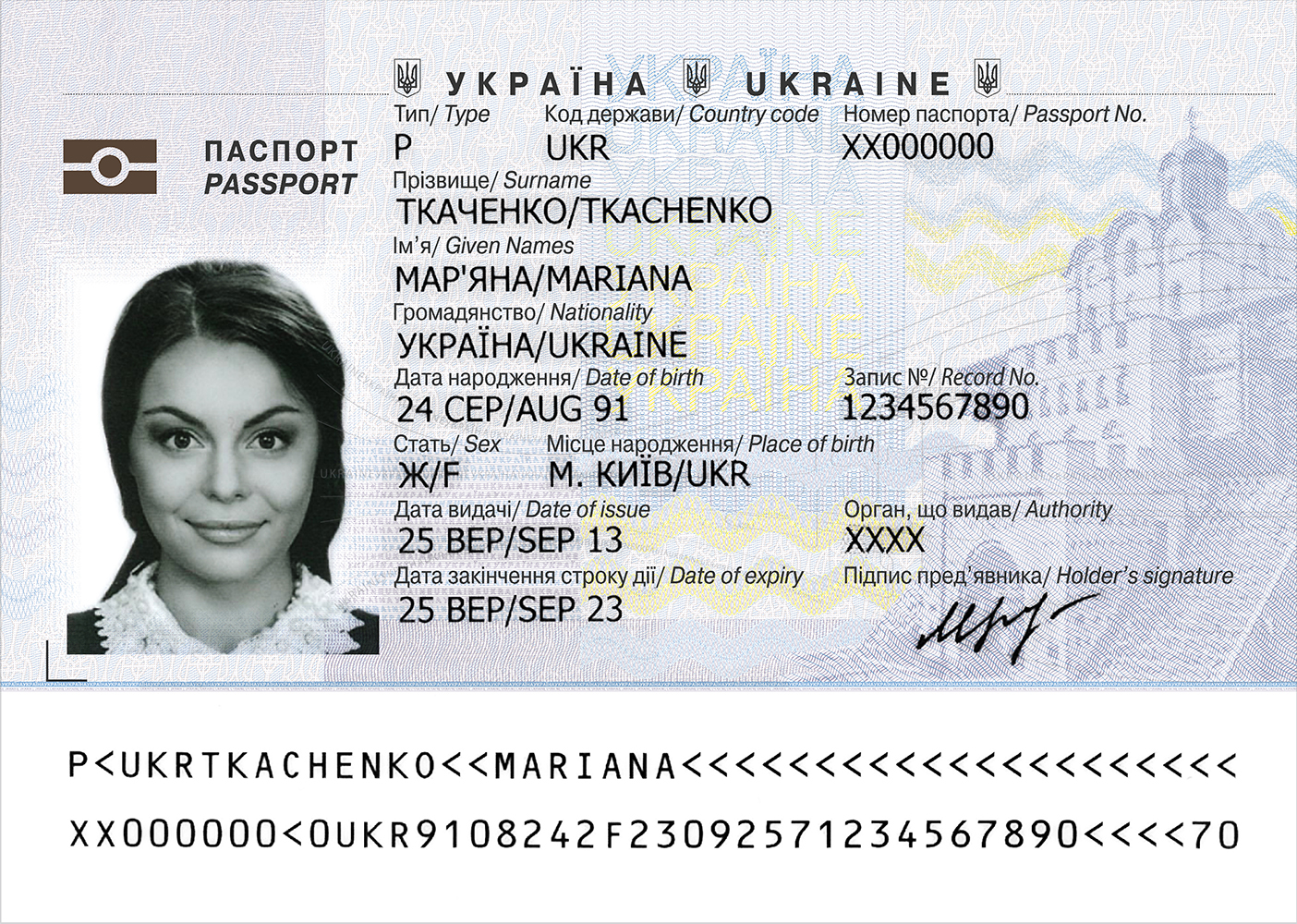
- International travel biometric passport biographical data page
- Type: Passport
- Issued by: State Migration Service of Ukraine
- First issued: 4 June 1994 (first version); 1997 (machine-readable passport); 1 January 2015 (biometric passport)
- Purpose: Identification
- Eligibility: Ukrainian citizenship
- Expiration: 10 years 4 years (for minors)
- Cost: ₴1200 ₴1800 (within 7 working days)

The Ukrainian passport (Ukrainian: Паспорт громадянина України для виїзду за кордон, lit. 'Passport of a citizen of Ukraine for traveling abroad') is a passport issued for nationals of Ukraine as proof of Ukrainian citizenship for travel abroad.

Until 2016, citizens were issued a soft booklet internal passport as their primary domestic identification document; the booklets were replaced by an identity card with existing passports remaining valid. Electronic passports are available to citizens through the government smartphone application Diia.

== Internal passport ==
The so-called "internal passport" in Ukraine is similar to an identity card elsewhere. According to law amendments made by the Verkhovna Rada (Ukrainian parliament) on 14 July 2016, each citizen who reached the age of 14 must get an internal passport. These are issued for four years to persons under 18 years of age, and for ten years for all the rest. Since then, the Ukrainian internal passports (in booklet form) are also no longer marked with a civil status (i.e. married or divorced), thus abolishing a century-long tradition from the times of the USSR. Instead, a marriage certificate is issued to each of the spouses.

The law of Ukraine on a unified state demographic register and identity documents, which envisages the introduction of electronic passports for Ukrainians, came into force on 6 December 2012.

On 10 July 2015, the Ukrainian government announced that internal passports would be abolished, and replaced with ID cards, starting from 1 January 2016. On 25 January 2016, the first new Ukrainian ID cards were issued to young citizens who achieved 16 years of age. Beginning November 1, 2016, ID cards are issued to all Ukrainian citizens.

== International passport ==
Passport for travel abroad, commonly known as an "international passport", is a document used for travel outside Ukraine. The passport information is recorded in Ukrainian and English. Passports are issued upon demand and are valid for 10 years. Two passports can be issued to those who frequently travel abroad.

The Ukrainian international passport follows international standards. The first Ukrainian passports (replacing the previous Soviet Union passport type) were introduced on 4 June 1994, while the machine-readable passports with two machine-readable strings at the bottom of the first page first appeared in 1997. The current Ukrainian international passport is a biometric one. If, based on religious beliefs, a citizen does not wish to receive a biometric passport, they can apply for a non-biometric one, providing a written statement before applying for the document.

Photos in the passports issued since 2007 are black and white, laser imprinted. As a security feature, an additional holder's photo is specially imprinted to be seen only when looking to the light through the page of the passport. Previously, passports used to be issued either with a glued-in colour photo or with a colour imprinted photo. The previously issued passports are valid until their expiration date.

New biometric international passports have dark blue cover and contain 32 pages. Covers of the international passports issued in 1990s were red, allowing easy visual distinction from blue-color internal passports.

By default, the first and last names in the international passport are transliterated from Ukrainian to English according to the National transliteration system (2010). However, any person has an option to request the desired English spelling of their first and last name, if they hold any document already having that spelling.

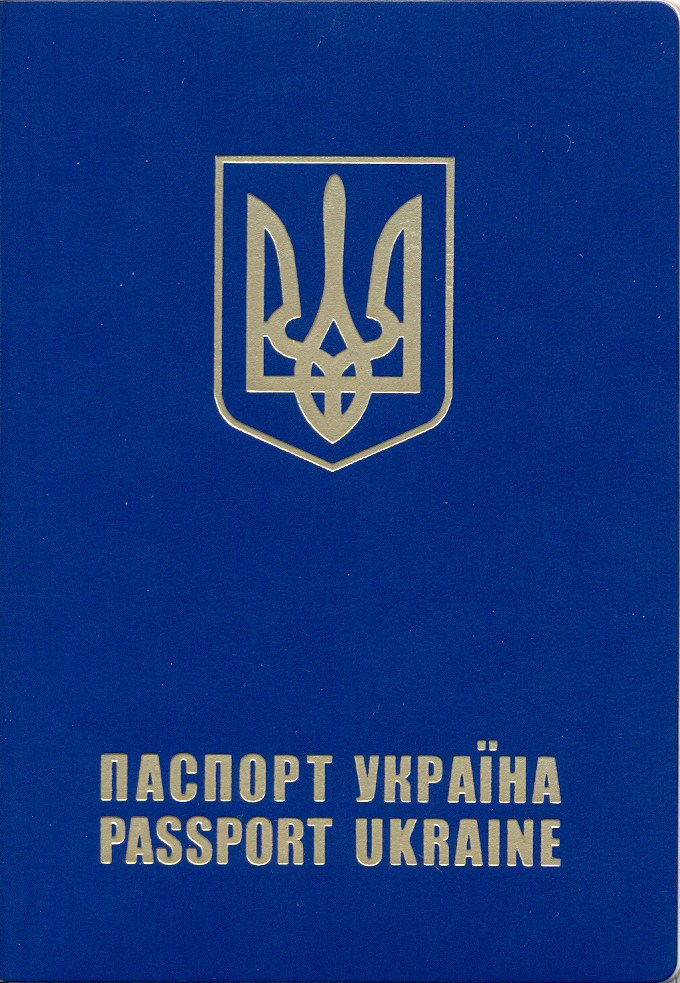
The front cover of a previous non-biometric Ukrainian passport.

Previously International Passports were issued only to citizens aged 18 and older (16 and older in case of permanent foreign residency). Prior to that age, Ukrainian citizens could get a Travel Document of a Child (PR type) similar in appearance to the passport valid for 3 years, and has only 8 pages. In some rare case Ukrainian citizens were allowed to have International Passport before the age of 18 or 16, but it also is valid for only 3 years. If a child holding Ukrainian citizenship has been adopted by a foreign citizen — they may get regular International Passport, which is valid for 10 years, just as for adults, instead of getting Child Travel Document.

=== Identity information page ===
The Ukrainian passport includes the following data:

- Photo of Passport Holder
- Type (P)
- Code (UKR)
- Passport No.
- Surname
- Given Names
- Nationality (УКРАЇНА/UKRAINE)
- Date of Birth
- Personal No.
- Sex
- Place of Birth
- Dat
- Date of Expiry
- Holder's Signature

The information page ends with the Machine Readable Zone starting with P<UKR.

Passports typically contain a message from the minister or official in charge of passport issuance addressed to the officials of foreign states, requesting that the citizen bearing the passport be allowed free passage through the state, and if in need be provided assistance consistent with international norms. Today this treatment is expected rather than requested, but the message remains as a tradition. Ukrainian passports bear the message:

In Ukrainian:

Іменем України Міністр закордонних справ України просить усіх кого це може стосуватися, всіма можливими заходами полегшити поїздку пред'явника паспорта, подавати йому необхідну допомогу та захист.

In English:

In the name of Ukraine, the Minister of Foreign Affairs of Ukraine requests all those whom it may concern to facilitate in every possible way the travel of the bearer of this passport and to provide the bearer with all necessary assistance and protection.

=== Other documents for foreign travel ===
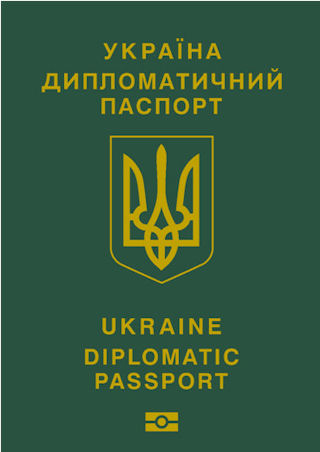
Diplomatic passport

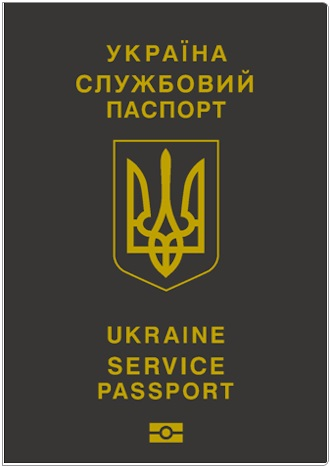
Service passport

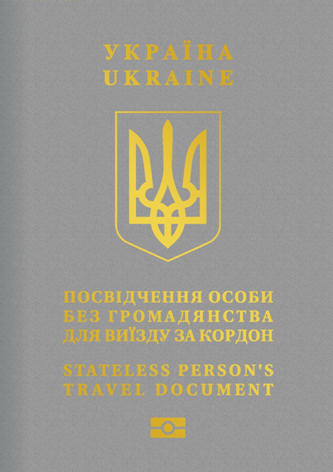
Stateless person's travel document

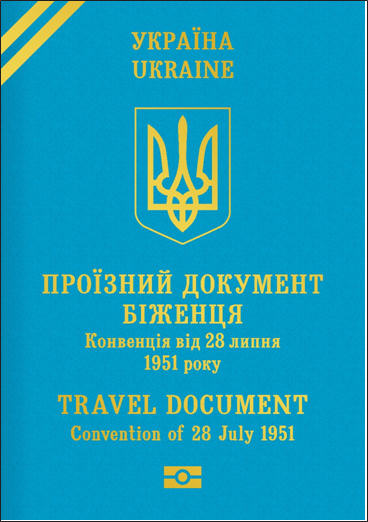
Refugee travel document

== Passport in a smartphone ==
Ukraine is a leading country in the world in issuing electronic passports. The passports are available within a smartphone application Diia issued by the Ministry of Digital Transformation of Ukraine. Inside the application the users can see electronic versions of their physical passports and they can generate QR codes that legally have essentially the same power as their physical counterparts.

== Visa requirements ==
Visa requirements for Ukrainian citizens Ukraine Visa free - special regime for refugees (entry is possible with any identity document) Visa free Visa issued upon arrival Electronic authorization or eVisa Visa available both on arrival or online Visa required prior to arrival

As of 09 May 2024, Ukrainian citizens with ordinary Ukrainian passports had visa-free or visa on arrival access to 148 countries and territories, (www.passportindex.org) thus ranking the Ukrainian passport 31st in the world in terms of travel freedom according to the Henley Passport Index. Additionally, Arton Capital's Passport Index ranked the ordinary Ukrainian passport 22nd in the world in terms of travel freedom, with a visa-free score of 94, as of 26 November 2022.

== History ==
The Ukrainian People's Republic (UNR) had a single passport for internal and international use. It consisted of 16 pages where first 7 pages contained information about the citizen and the rest were appointed for visas. The information was written in Ukrainian, French and German.

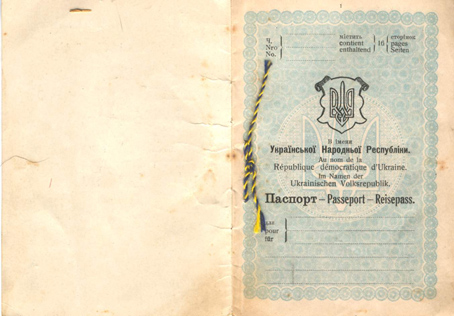

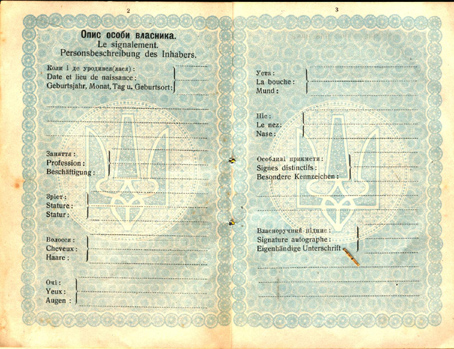

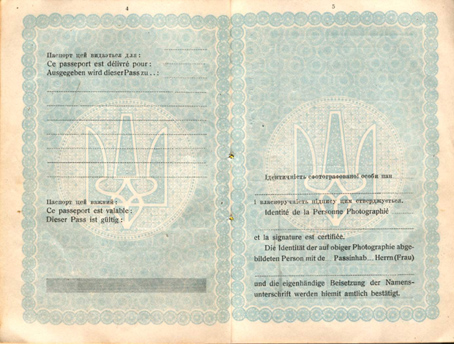

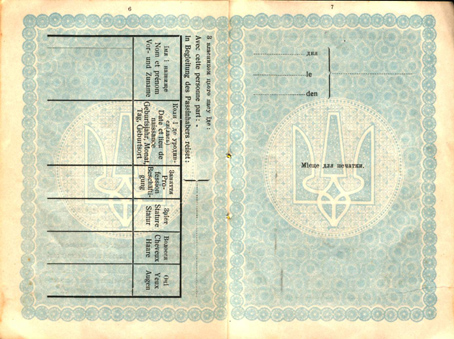

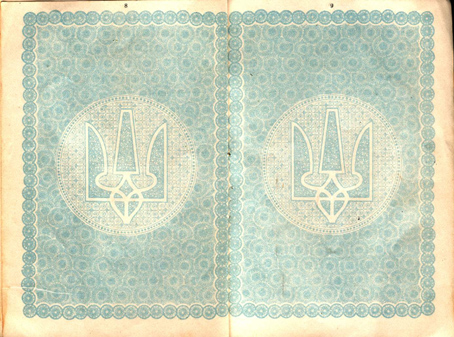

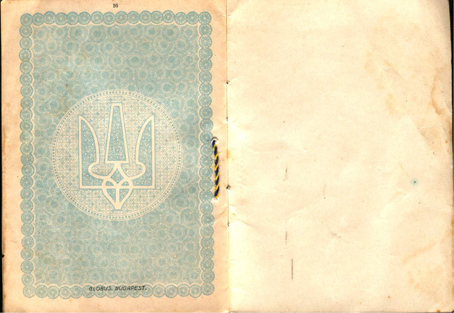

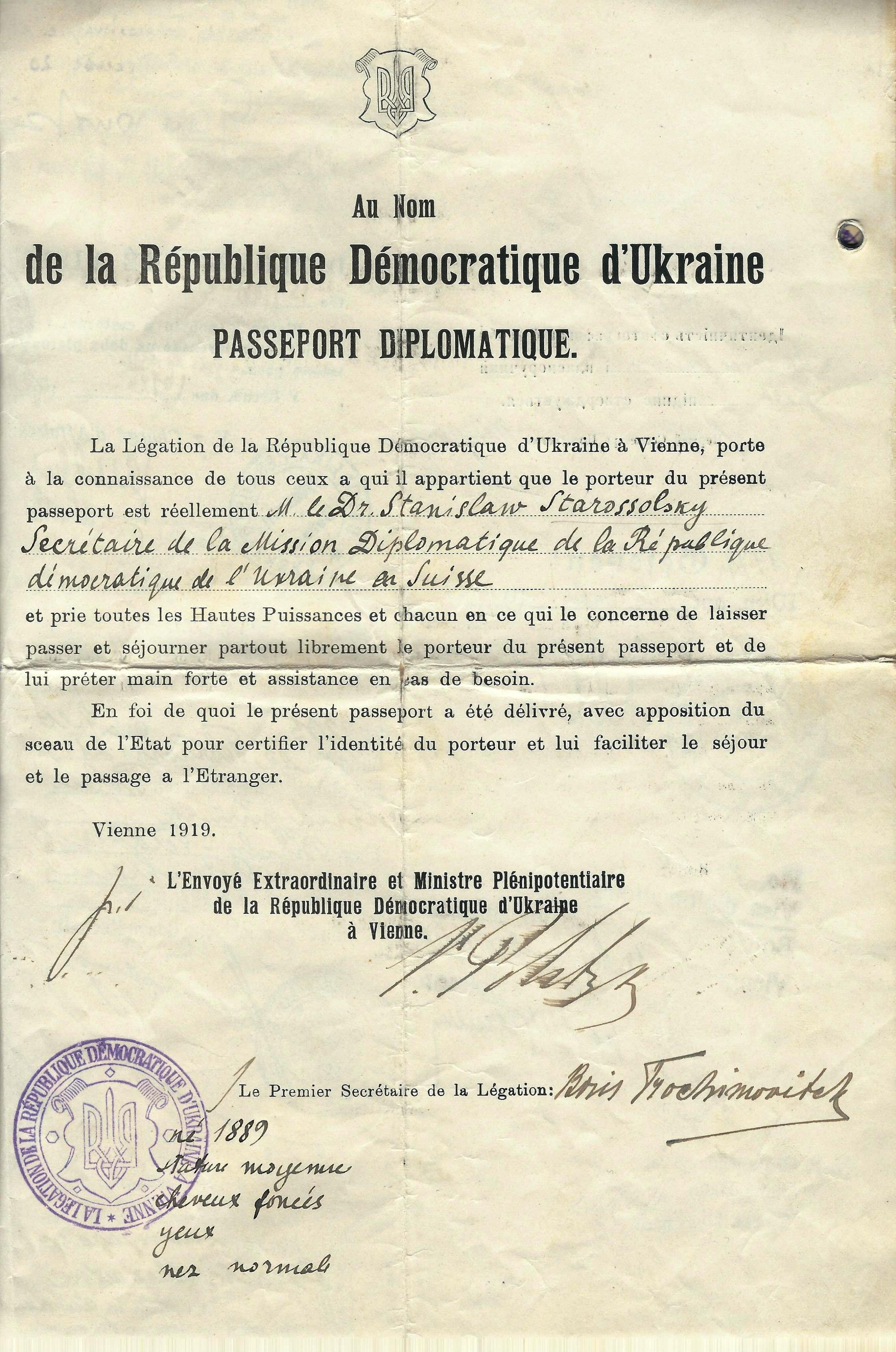
1919 Ukraine DIPLOMATIC pass. - Vienna

== See also ==
- Ukrainian Travel Document of a Child
- Ukrainian citizenship
- Ukrainian identity card
- Visa requirements for Ukrainian citizens
- Visa policy of Ukraine
