= Diia =

E-governance service in Ukraine

- Developer: Ministry of Digital Transformation of Ukraine
- Release: February 6, 2020
- Stable release: 4.0 / December 16, 2023
- Platform: Android, iOS, Web platform
- Available in: Ukrainian
- Type: e-government
- License: EUPL-1.2 (availability is limited to the residents of Ukraine only, though the usage is free of cost)
- Website: diia.gov.ua
- Repository: github.com/diia-open-source

Diia (Ukrainian: Дія [ˈd⁽ʲ⁾ijɐ], lit. 'Action'; also an acronym for Держава і Я, Derzhava i Ya, IPA: [derˈʒɑwɐ i ˈjɑ], lit. 'State and Me') is a mobile app, a web portal and a brand of e-governance in Ukraine.

Launched in 2020, the Diia app allows Ukrainian citizens to use digital documents on their smartphones instead of physical ones for identification and sharing purposes. The Diia portal allows access to over 130 government services. Eventually, the government plans to make all kinds of state-person interactions available through Diia.

Diia was built in partnership with the United States and is poised to be shared with other countries. On the sidelines of the 2023 World Economic Forum in Davos, USAID Administrator Samantha Power said the US hopes to replicate the success of Diia in other countries.

== History ==
Diia was first presented on September 27, 2019, by the Ministry of Digital Transformation of Ukraine as a brand of the State in a Smartphone project. Vice Prime Minister and Minister of Digital Transformation Mykhailo Fedorov announced the creation of a mobile app and a web portal that would unite in a single place all the services provided by the state to citizens and businesses.

On February 6, 2020, the mobile app Diia was officially launched. During the presentation, Ukrainian president Volodymyr Zelenskyy said that 9 million Ukrainians now have access to their driver's license and car registration documents on their phones, while Prime Minister Oleksiy Honcharuk called the implementation of the State in a Smartphone project a priority for the government.

In April 2020, the Ukrainian government approved a resolution for experimental usage of digital ID-cards and passports which would be issued to all Ukrainians via the Diia.

On October 5, 2020, during the Diia Summit, the government presented a first major update of the app and web portal branded "Diia 2.0". More types of documents were added to the app as well as the ability to share documents with others via a single tap on a push-message. The web portal in turn expanded the number of available services to 27, including the ability to register a private limited company in half an hour. President Zelenskyy, who opened the summit, announced that in 2021 Ukraine will enter the "paper less" mode by prohibiting civil servants from demanding paper documents.

By the end of 2020, the app had more than six million users, while the portal had 50 available services.

In March 2021, the Ukrainian parliament adopted a bill equating digital identity documents with their physical analogues. Starting on August 23, Ukrainian citizens can use digital ID-cards and passports for all purposes while in Ukraine. According to Minister of Digital Transformation Mykhailo Fedorov, Ukraine will become the first country in the world where digital identity documents are considered legally equivalent to ordinary ones.

In September 2024, Diia launched an online marriage registration service, which can be beneficial especially for military personnel who spend much time on the frontline separated from their partners.

In October 2024, Diia's online marriage service appeared in Time's Inventions of the 2024 list. In the first month of its operations over 1.1 million Ukrainians tried to make proposals using the technology, and 435 couples got married.

== Benefits and challenges ==
The first and most obvious benefit is the convenience of such a platform. Citizens can have many documents on their smartphones at once, without concern about losing or damaging them. Whenever needed, they can just open an app on their smartphones and show/check the document they need. The idea is that Diia will help cut the bureaucracy associated with public services, which in turn will help fight corruption and increase government savings. Fewer people are needed to be employed in the public sector and fewer human to human interactions are supposed to happen. With the start of the program, already 10% of government employees were reduced, which contributes to hundreds of millions of dollars in savings, but besides this, the initiative also improves the speed, efficiency, and transparency of government services. In addition, the digitalization of the government sector helps to develop the whole IT industry in the country, people become more digitally aware and educated, this affects other sectors as well, increasing the spread of digital infrastructure and expediting the speed of overall digitalization.

The UN E-government Development Index, which assesses the capabilities of governments to integrate its functions electronically, such as the use of internet and mobile devices, ranked Ukraine 69th in 193 countries surveyed in 2020.

Despite its low ranking in the e-government development index, Ukraine made a big jump on the e-participation index, which they ranked 43rd out of 193 countries from 0.66 in 2018 to 0.81 in 2020 (un.org, 2020), suggesting that the government and its citizens are adapting the IT-based government functions.

The main goal of e-government according to Perez-Morote et.al. (2020) is to have accountability and transparency among the countries involved. But to do so, there are several challenges that a country should assess first prior to implementing e-government.

In the research written by Heeks (2001), the author identified 2 main challenges that countries face in the development of e-government, first is the strategic challenge which involves the preparedness (e-readiness) of the entire government system for electronic transformation, and second challenge is the tactical challenge where the government must design (e-governance design) a system where it can be understood by every user, it's important that the information that needs to be communicated to the consumers is received clearly.

For the first challenge (e-readiness), Ukraine had an internet penetration rate of 76% in 2020 and is expected to grow to 82%, it is important that consumers have the internet access for it to enable the consumers to utilize the service. Another factor is the readiness of its institutional infrastructure, which means that the government has its own organization which is solely focused on implementing the e-government project. In the case of Ukraine, the e-governance team is led by Oleksandr Ryzhenko, and the country's e-governance initiative is even further strengthened by ensuring that the data and legal infrastructure are already prepared. Ukraine has done this by modernizing their legislation that is more appropriate in the digital service, and the data exchange solution used by Ukraine is called Trembita. The human infrastructure is also being updated, as competent individuals must be the one doing the task, hence, EGOV4UKRAINE was launched, this aims to get IT developers for developing a system for administrative services. These efforts by the Ukrainian government did not go unnoticed, and they received an award from the e-Governance Academy as "partner of the year 2017".

For the second challenge, which deals with the system design, the success of Ukraine can be seen on the latest data of UNDP, where it shows a high increase in the E-participation index. In 2018, Ukraine ranked 75th it ranked 46th in 2020 (un.org, 2020).

Despite visible success, the implementation of the e-government was accompanied by problems. Data leakage became the main one. In May 2020, the data of 26 million driver's licenses appeared in the public domain on the Internet. The Ukrainian government said the Diia app was not linked to a data breach, but it is impossible to say for certain. Any storage of official documents in electronic format is associated with the risk of their leakage. In addition, the Diia application still has data protection issues, as the required protection system has not been implemented. This is also compounded by the country's weak data protection legal regime. In addition, since 2023, Ukrainians are able to register their cars with this app. Issued license plates are not using regional codes, but they are using special codes starting with DI or PD.

== Diia City ==
In May 2020, the government presented Diia City headed by Oleksandr Borniakov, a large-scale project which would establish a virtual model of a free economic zone for representatives of the creative economy. It would provide for special digital residency with a particular taxation regime, intellectual property protection and simplified regulations. Diia City concurrently imposes certain constraints on contracts involving individual entrepreneurs (FOPs). It also offers the benefit of tax rebates.

Diia City garners endorsement from the Ukrainian government, believing it will support the country's position in the IT market. As of July 30, 2023, the program had more than 600 residents, including companies like iGama, Avenga, SBRobotiks, and Intellectsoft.

== See also ==
- Digital divide
- Singpass, a similar app in Singapore
