= Ukrainian Startup Fund =

Ukrainian government institution

The Ukrainian Startup Fund (USF), officially known as the Innovation Development Fund, is a state institution run by the Government of Ukraine to help tech startups in raising funds early in the development of new projects.

== History ==
The Ukrainian Startup Fund was established in 2018 by the Cabinet of Ministers on the initiative of the Minister of Finance of Ukraine, Oksana Markarova.

After its supervisory board had been established and budget approved, it began operations in December 2019. In 2019, the grant programme was established, enabling US25,000 or US50,000 for pre-seed teams and seed teams respectively. The first Pitch Day was held in early 2020, attracting a large number of respondents. The winners were awarded by the President and the Prime Minister of Ukraine. During that year, the accelerator programme was established, allowing for funding of up to $10,000 for acceleration training, and various other funds have been added since.

By the end of 2022, USF was the largest angel investor in Ukraine and Eastern Europe. At that time it had begun cooperation with the European Institute of Innovation and Technology and European Innovation Council, to help develop the deep tech industry in Ukraine.

From 2023, it has been managed by the Ministry of Digital Transformation. In this year, the Brave1 defence technology programme was launched, and in 2024, a $2.5 million grant programme was created to support pre-seed and seed tech startups. In November 2024, Ukraine joined the European Startup Nations Alliance (ESNA).

In November 2025 the fund, along with Brave1 and the State Emergency Service of Ukraine, launched a grant program for makers of fire-fighting unmanned aerial systems (UAS) and unmanned ground vehicles.

== Description and governance ==
The USF has the primary function of giving financial and ongoing support to startups, including promotion and helping them to enter global markets. It employs qualified and experienced experts in innovation and investment to provide feedback and advice to new entrepreneurs. It also helps to establish and expand collaborations and cooperation with various other with representatives of the national and international startups. It provides mentoring, training opportunities, and marketing for client startups, holding hackathons, bootcamps, workshops, and demonstration days, along with key partner stakeholders and a number of international companies and organisations.

Since the Russian invasion in 2022, military technology has become its first priority, along with reconstruction and economic development of Ukraine.

The supervisory board comprises experienced professionals and entrepreneurs, including (as of December 2022):

- Viktoriya Tihipko, managing partner of TA Ventures
- Olena Kosharna (aka Lenna Koszarny), co-founder of Horizon Capital
- Dmytro Shymkiv, senior manager in the innovation sector, board member of Kyivstar
- Oleksandr Bornyakov, Deputy Minister of Digital Transformation

Fedir Serdiuk, a Ukrainian entrepreneur and co-founder of FAST (First Aid and Special Training) in 2016 and PULSE (a charity focused on developing of tactical combat casualty care in Ukraine since 2022) was a board member of USF in 2023 and 2024.

The annual budget of USF is around 5-20 million Euros. Its strategy was developed with the support of the World Bank.

Among others, beneficiaries of USF programmes include Esper Bionics, Awesomic, and Upswot.

== Recognition ==
In 2020 USF won the Impact of the Year award of the largest Ukrainian IT Awards, and in 2021 won the Best Seed Finance Fund for Fintech, nomination from UAFIC (Ukrainian Association of FinTech and Innovation Companies, a non-governmental organization founded in 2018).

In 2024, the USF was recognised "as one of Ukraine's most successful reforms in 2020–2024". Also in that year, USF was ranked 4th in the implementation of the Startup Nations Standards, and its programmes were recognised as best practice by ESNA.

== Film ==
A documentary film about the Ukrainian technology industry during the Russian invasion of Ukraine, titled Made with Bravery: The Story of Ukrainian Startup, was created by Canadian producers.
