= Visa requirements for Ukrainian citizens =

Administrative entry restrictions

Visa requirements for Ukrainian citizens are administrative entry restrictions imposed by the authorities of other states on citizens of Ukraine.

As of 2026, Ukrainian citizens have visa-free or visa on arrival access to 142 countries and territories, ranking the Ukrainian passport 32nd in the world, according to the Henley Passport Index.

== Visa requirements map ==
Visa requirements for Ukrainian citizens holding ordinary passports Ukraine Unlimited Visa not required / ETA (Note: ETA required for Kenya, Israel, Mexico if arriving by air, Mozambique, Saint Kitts and Nevis, Seychelles, South Africa and Sri Lanka) Visa on arrival eVisa Visa available both on arrival or online (Note: Including Indonesian e-VOA) Visa required prior to arrival Admission restricted

== Travel documents of Ukrainian citizens ==
For traveling to certain countries, Ukrainians do not need to use a passport, as they may use their Ukrainian identity card.

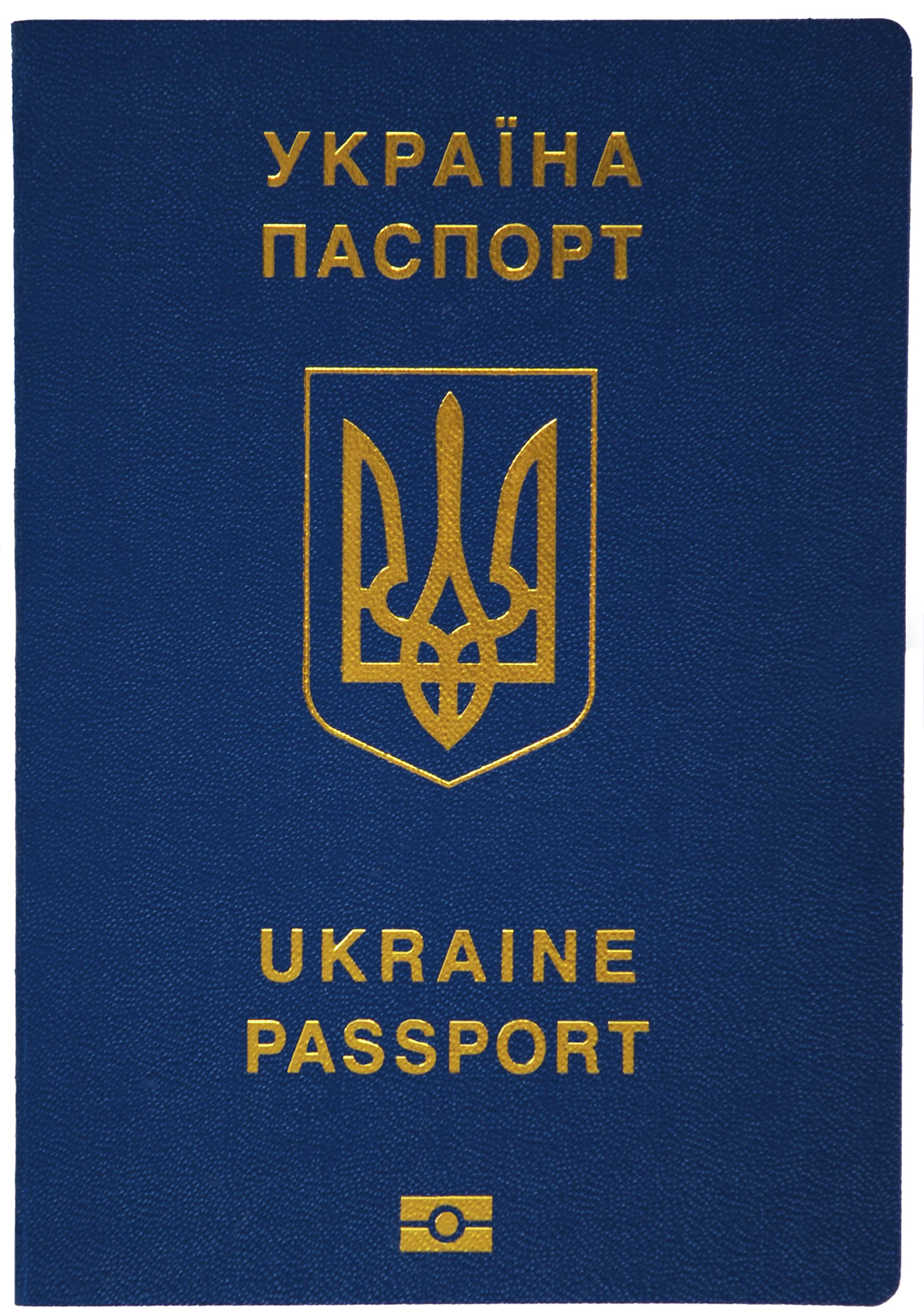
Front cover of a biometric Ukrainian passport

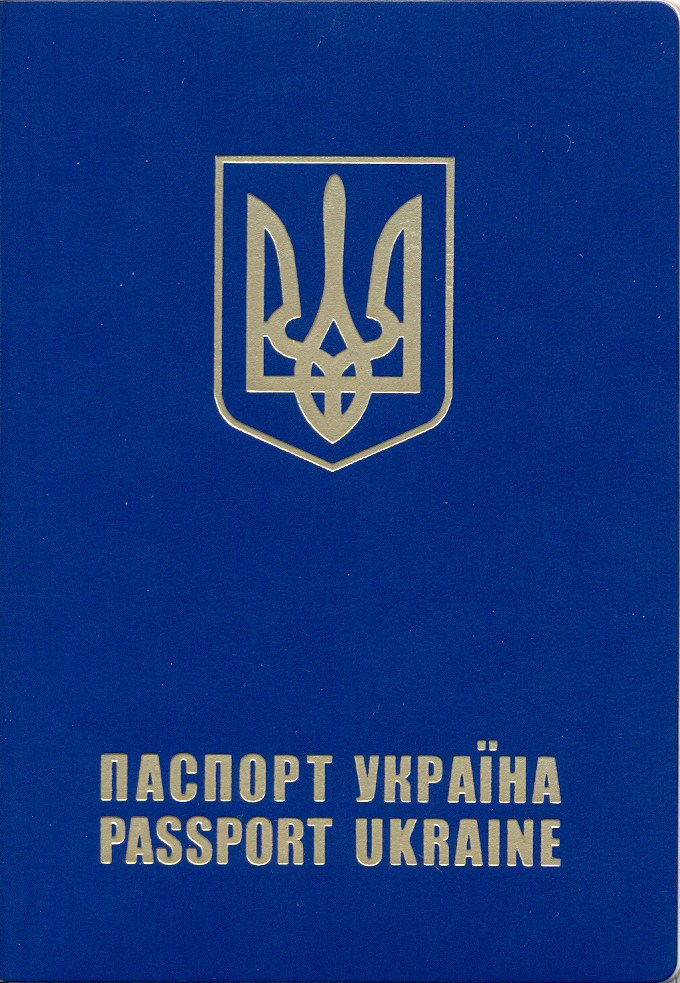
Front cover of a non-biometric Ukrainian passport (not issued anymore)

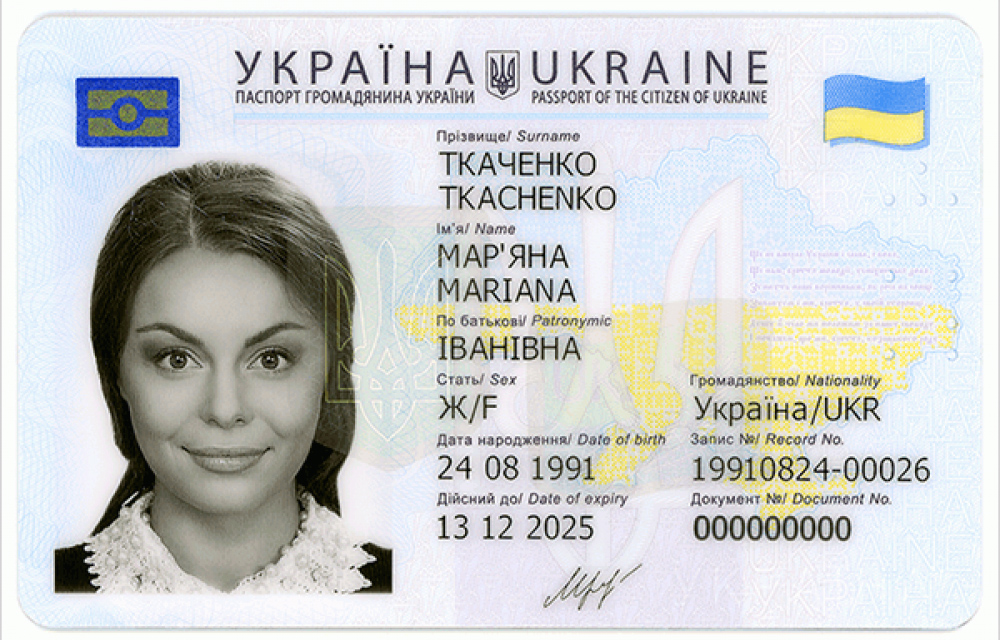
Ukrainian identity card

== General information ==
Documents which give the right to leave Ukraine and to enter Ukraine and certify the identity of a citizen of Ukraine while staying abroad are:

- passport of a citizen of Ukraine for traveling abroad (citizens of Ukraine can use a general-purpose passport for travel to Georgia and Turkey when arriving directly);
- diplomatic passport;
- service passport;
- travel document of the child;
- seaman's identify card.

It's important to know, that the special rules of arriving in a particular country should be studied carefully. Thus, in most countries that do not require visas or issue visas, upon arrival you must have a passport, which is valid for at least 3 months from arrival in that country.

Regardless of the entry regime, foreign border services may require documents confirming the purpose of the visit and the availability of sufficient financial resources for travel. The visa-free regime with other countries does not give the right to work in them. Failure to comply with this rule may result in a fine with subsequent deportation. Some countries may charge a fee for entry or exit.

In cases where a visa is issued upon arrival, it may be necessary to have 1-2 color passport photographs of the person crossing the border. For visa-free travel to the countries of the Schengen area, you need only a biometric passport. Owners of passports of the old model need a visa or residence permit in one of the countries of the Schengen zone.

=== Recent ===
Recently visa requirements for Ukrainian citizens were lifted by Paraguay (28 May 2009), Montenegro (24 October 2010), Hong Kong (3 November 2010), Israel (9 February 2011), Argentina (2 October 2011), Brunei (2 November 2011), Bosnia and Herzegovina (27 November 2011), Serbia (8 December 2011), Brazil (30 December 2011), Turkey (1 August 2012), Panama (16 August 2013), Chile (21 October 2015), Costa Rica (28 December 2016), Saint Kitts and Nevis (27 January 2017), Albania (1 April 2017), all countries of Schengen Area (11 June 2017), Qatar (9 August 2017), United Arab Emirates (31 December 2017), Kuwait (18 April 2018), Uruguay (15 February 2019), Thailand (14 April 2019), Colombia (17 April 2020), Grenada (1 March 2021), Saint Vincent and the Grenadines (7 April 2021), Ireland (25 February 2022), Kosovo (10 April 2022), Mozambique (14 March 2023), Kiribati (1 September 2023), Zambia (1 January 2025), Gibraltar (15 July 2026) and South Africa (8 September 2026).

== Visa requirements ==
Country	Visa requirement	Allowed stay	Notes (excluding departure fees)
Afghanistan	eVisa	30 days	A visa is not required for individuals born in Afghanistan or for those who can provide proof that one of their parents is an Afghan national or was born in Afghanistan.; e-Visa : Visitors must arrive at Kabul International (KBL).
Albania	Visa not required	90 days	90 days within any 180-day period.
Algeria	Visa required		Persons may be denied entry if entering with a passport containing visas or stamps issued by Israel.; Visitors on tours organized to some southern regions by an approved travel agency may obtain a visa on arrival for up to 30 days.
Andorra	Visa not required	90 days	
Angola	eVisa		
Antigua and Barbuda	Visa not required	180 days	
Argentina	Visa not required	90 days	90 days within any 180-day period.
Armenia	Visa not required	180 days	180 days in a year.
Australia	Online Visa		May apply online (Online Visitor e600 visa).
Austria	Visa not required	90 days	90 days within any 180-day period in the Schengen Area. (Note: Holders of biometric passports only.)
Azerbaijan	Visa not required	90 days	If staying in Azerbaijan for more than 15 days, visitors must register at the State Migration Service within 3 days of arrival.; The Government of Azerbaijan prohibits entry to persons of Armenian origin.
The Bahamas	eVisa	3 months	Visa not required for permanent residents of Canada or the United States.; Cruise ship passengers travelling to and returning from the Bahamas do not require to obtain visa for entry. Both entry and departure must be by a cruise ship.
Bahrain	eVisa / Visa on arrival	14 days	Visa may be issued on arrival for a stay up to 1 month.; Visa may be extended for an additional 2 weeks.; e-Visa issued for 14 days with the possibility of a one-time extension.
Bangladesh	Visa on arrival	30 days	Extension of stay is possible for an additional 30 days.
Barbados	Visa not required	28 days	
Belarus	Visa not required	90 days	90 days within any 180-day period.
Belgium	Visa not required	90 days	90 days within any 180-day period in the Schengen Area.
Belize	Visa required		Visa not required for visits not exceeding 30 days for those holding a valid multiple-entry visa or Permanent Residence Card of US, Canada or holding a valid multiple-entry Schengen visa.
Benin	eVisa	30 days	Must have an international vaccination certificate.; Three types of electronic visa are offered: the e-Visa valid for 30 days for a single entry (50 EUR), the e-Visa valid for 30 days for several (multiple) entries (75 EUR), and the e-Visa valid for 90 days to make several (multiple) entries (100 EUR).
Bhutan	eVisa	90 days	The Sustainable Development Fee (SDF) of 200 USD per person, per night for almost all visitors to Bhutan. Additionally, if payment is made in US dollars from September 1, 2023 to August 31, 2027, the SDF is 100 USD.
Bolivia	Visa required		
Bosnia and Herzegovina	Visa not required	30 days	30 days within any 2-month period.
Botswana	eVisa	3 months	
Brazil	Visa not required	90 days	90 days within any 180-day period.; Extension of stay is possible.
Brunei	Visa not required	30 days	
Bulgaria	Visa not required	90 days	90 days within any 180-day period in the Schengen Area.
Burkina Faso	eVisa		
Burundi	Online Visa / Visa on arrival	1 month	
Cambodia	eVisa / Visa on arrival	30 days	
Cameroon	eVisa		
Canada	Visa required		The Liberal party of Canada has proposed a resolution to remove the visitor visa requirement for Ukrainian citizens, enabling short - term, visa - free travel for up to 90 days within a 180 - day period via the electronic travel authorization ( eTA ) system.
Cape Verde	Visa on arrival (EASE)	30 days	Must register online (EASE) at least 5 days prior to arrival.
Central African Republic	Visa required		
Chad	eVisa	90 days	
Chile	Visa not required	90 days	Extension of stay is possible for an additional 90 days for a fee.
China	Visa required Visa not required (exceptional)		Registration mandatory within 24 hours of arrival, registration is done during hotel check by hotel staff in if staying at an approved hotel or hostel.; All visitors between the ages of 14 and 70 are fingerprinted upon arrival and departure.; 24-hour (1 day) visa-free transit through any international airports of China, allows domestic travel through different airports. (Note: Custom procedure for 24-hour visa-free transit is required in principle, except in Beijing (both Capital and Daxing), Shanghai Pudong, Hangzhou, Xiamen, Guangzhou, Shenzhen, Chengdu Tianfu and Xi'an if no leaving of international transit areas.); 240-hour (10 days) visa-free transit through: Airports: Beihai, Beijing – Capital, Beijing – Daxing, Changsha, Chengdu – Shuangliu, Chengdu – Tianfu, Chongqing, Dalian, Fuzhou, Guangzhou, Guilin, Guiyang, Haikou, Hangzhou, Harbin, Hefei, Huangshan, Jinan, Jieyang, Kunming, Lijiang, Nanchang, Nanjing, Nanning, Ningbo, Qingdao, Quanzhou, Sanya, Shanghai – Hongqiao, Shanghai – Pudong, Shenyang, Shenzhen, Shijiazhuang, Taiyuan, Tianjin, Weihai, Wenzhou, Wuhan, Wuxi, Wuyishan, Xiamen, Xi'an, Yangzhou, Yantai, Yiwu, Zhangjiajie, Zhengzhou; Seaports: Beihai, Dalian, Lianyungang, Nansha, Qinhuangdao, Qingdao, Shanghai, Shekou, Tianjin, Wenzhou, Xiamen, Zhoushan; Railways: Mohan railway station – Laos side: Boten; Hong Kong, Macau and Taiwan count as third countries under the 24 and 240-hours transit without visa (TWOV) policies.; Visa not required for 30 days on Hainan Island.; Visa not required for 15 days if arriving via cruise ports as part of tour groups.
Colombia	Visa not required	90 days	Extension of stay is possible for up to 180 days within a calendar year.
Comoros	Visa on arrival	45 days	
Republic of the Congo	Visa required		
Democratic Republic of the Congo	eVisa	7 days	
Costa Rica	Visa not required	180 days	
Côte d'Ivoire	eVisa	3 months	e-Visa holders must arrive via Port Bouet Airport.
Croatia	Visa not required	90 days	90 days within any 180-day period in the Schengen Area.
Cuba	eVisa	90 days	Extension of stay is possible for another 90 days for a fee.
Cyprus	Visa not required	90 days	90 days within any 180-day period.
Czech Republic	Visa not required	90 days	90 days within any 180-day period in the Schengen Area.
Denmark	Visa not required	90 days	90 days within any 180-day period in the Schengen Area.
Djibouti	eVisa / Visa on arrival	30 days	
Dominica	Visa not required	90 days	90 days within any 180-day period.
Dominican Republic	Visa not required	30 days	For tourist purposes only.; A tourist card must be obtained on arrival for a fee.; Extension of stay is possible for up to 120 days for a fee.
Ecuador	Visa not required	90 days	Extension of stay is possible.
Egypt	eVisa / Visa on arrival	30 days	Extension of stay is possible.; Tourists arriving at Sharm El Sheikh, Saint Catherine or Taba airports and remaining in the Sinai resorts do not require a visa for up to 15 days.
El Salvador	Visa not required	180 days	A tourist card must be obtained on arrival for a fee.
Equatorial Guinea	eVisa		e-Visa holders must arrive via Malabo International Airport.
Eritrea	Visa required		Passengers with a confirmation that a visa has been approved before departure may obtain a visa on arrival if sponsor in Eritrea submits the request to the Eritrean Immigration Authority 48 hours before arrival and the passenger has 1 passport photo.
Estonia	Visa not required	90 days	90 days within any 180-day period in the Schengen Area.
Eswatini	Visa not required	30 days	Extension of stay is possible for an additional 30 days.
Ethiopia	eVisa / Visa on arrival	90 days	e-Visa holders must arrive via Addis Ababa Bole International Airport. e-Visa is available for 30 or 90 days.; According to the e-Visa website, as of 18 November 2020, credit card payment transactions are not accepted for applicants from Crimea region of Ukraine.; Visa on arrival is obtainable only at Addis Ababa Bole International Airport.
Fiji	Visa not required	4 months	Extension of stay is possible for an additional 2 months.
Finland	Visa not required	90 days	90 days within any 180-day period in the Schengen Area.
France	Visa not required	90 days	90 days within any 180-day period in the Schengen Area.
Gabon	eVisa	90 days	e-Visa holders must arrive via Libreville International Airport.
The Gambia	Visa required		Citizens of Ukraine travelling on charter flights and as part of tour groups may enter without a visa.
Georgia	Visa not required	1 year	Citizens of Ukraine may enter with an ID card if arriving directly from Ukraine.
Germany	Visa not required	90 days	90 days within any 180-day period in the Schengen Area.
Ghana	eVisa	90 days	
Greece	Visa not required	90 days	90 days within any 180-day period in the Schengen Area.
Grenada	Visa not required	3 months	
Guatemala	Visa not required	90 days	Extension of stay is possible for 90 days.
Guinea	eVisa	90 days	
Guinea-Bissau	Visa on arrival		
Guyana	eVisa		An eVisa(Approval letter) can only be obtained after contacting the Department of Immigration and Citizenship by phone.; Payment is done upon arrival.
Haiti	Visa not required	3 months	
Honduras	Visa not required	90 days	
Hungary	Visa not required	90 days	90 days within any 180-day period in the Schengen Area.
Iceland	Visa not required	90 days	90 days within any 180-day period in the Schengen Area.
India	eVisa	30 days	e-Visa holders must arrive via 32 designated airports (Note: Ahmedabad; Amritsar; Bagdogra; Bengaluru; Bhubaneswar; Chandigarh; Chennai; Coimbatore; Delhi; Gaya; Goa-Dabolim; Goa-Manohar; Guwahati; Hyderabad; Indore; Jaipur; Kannur; Kochi; Kolkata; Kozhikode; Lucknow; Madurai; Mangaluru; Mumbai; Nagpur; Port Blair; Pune; Surat; Thiruvananthapuram; Tiruchirappalli; Varanasi; Visakhapatnam) or 5 designated seaports. (Note: Chennai; Cochin; Mormugao; Mumbai; Mangalore); An Indian e-Tourist Visa may only be obtained twice within 1 calendar year.; Foreigners of Pakistani origin or who hold a Pakistani Passport are not eligible for an e-Visa. Foreigners who are not Pakistani nationals, but whose parents or grandparents (either paternal or maternal) were born in, or were permanent residents in Pakistan, are also not eligible for an e-Visa.
Indonesia	e-VOA / Visa on arrival	30 days	
Iran	eVisa	30 days	Citizens of Ukraine who have already made an application, at least two days before arrival, at the Iranian Ministry of Foreign Affair's e-Visa website and present the submission notification at the airport's visa desk may obtain a visa on arrival.; Admission will be refused: to women not wearing Islamic head cover, scarf, long sleeves or stockings.; to holders of passports containing an Israeli visa/stamp in the last 12 months.; 14 day visa-free on Kish and Qeshm Islands.; Extension of stay is possible twice for 30 days for a total of up to 90 days.
Iraq	eVisa	30 days	Holders of passports containing an Israeli stamp or visa will be refused entry in Iraq.
Ireland	Visa not required	90 days	Holders of biometric passports only.
Israel	Electronic Travel Authorization	90 days	ETA-IL is valid for 2 years for the date of issuance.; 90 days within any 180-day period.
Italy	Visa not required	90 days	90 days within any 180-day period in the Schengen Area.
Jamaica	Visa not required	30 days	For tourist purposes only.
Japan	Visa required		
Jordan	eVisa / Visa on arrival	30 days	Visa may be obtained on arrival, it will cost a total of 40 JOD, obtainable at most international ports of entry and land border crossings. (except King Hussein/Allenby Bridge).; Extension of stay is possible for up to 60 days.
Kazakhstan	Visa not required	90 days	90 days within any 180-day period.
Kenya	Electronic Travel Authorization	90 days	Applications can be submitted up to 90 days prior to travel and must be submitted at least 3 days in advance.; eTA fee is 32.50 USD.; Proof of reservation at the hotel where visitors plan to stay is required (if staying with friends, an invitation letter is also acceptable).; Yellow fever vaccination certificate is required if coming from endemic countries.
Kiribati	Visa not required	1 month	The maximum period of stay in Kiribati must not exceed 90 days within any 12-month period.
North Korea	Visa required		
South Korea	Visa required		Visa not required for 30 days on Jeju Island.
Kuwait	eVisa / Visa on arrival	3 months	Holders of passports containing an Israeli stamp or visa will be refused entry in Kuwait.
Kyrgyzstan	Visa not required	90 days	90 days within any 180-day period.
Laos	eVisa / Visa on arrival	30 days	18 (Note: Savannakhet Airport; Lanetoui - Mengkang (China); Meuangmom - Wan Pong (Myanmar); Banvang - Ban Khok Phai (Thailand); Namngeun - Huay Kon (Thailand); Paksan - Bueng Kan (Thailand); Paktaphan - Pak Saeng (Thailand); Pangmon - Ban Huak (Thailand); Phoudou (Thailand); Dak ta ock - Nam Giang (Vietnam); La Lai (Vietnam); Namkan (Vietnam); Namphao - Cau Treo (Vietnam); Namsoy - Na Meo (Vietnam); Naphao - Cha Lo (Vietnam); Pahang - Long Sap (Vietnam); Panghok - Tây Trang (Vietnam); Phoukeua - Bo Y (Vietnam)) of the 33 border crossings are only open to regular visa holders.; e-Visa may be used to enter Laos through the Luang Prabang, Pakse and Vientiane international airports, 3 Thai-Lao Friendship Bridges (Note: Vientiane (Friendship Bridge 1); Savannakhet (Friendship Bridge 2); Bokeo (Friendship Bridge 4)), in Boten (road and railroad), and in Vientiane (at Khamsavath railway station).; Visa on arrival is available at the Luang Prabang, Pakse and Vientiane international airports, 4 Thai-Lao Friendship Bridges (Note: Vientiane (Friendship Bridge 1); Savannakhet (Friendship Bridge 2); Khammouane (Friendship Bridge 3); Bokeo (Friendship Bridge 4)) and 7 border crossings. (Note: Nongnokkheane - Trapeang Kriel (Cambodia); Boten - Bo han (China); Golden Triangle/Samliemkham (Thailand); Khamsavath railway station (Thailand); Namheuang - Ban Na Kraseng (Thailand); Vang tao - Chongmek (Thailand); Dansavan - Lao Bảo (Vietnam))
Latvia	Visa not required	90 days	90 days within any 180-day period in the Schengen Area.
Lebanon	Free visa on arrival	1 month	Extension of stay is possible for an additional 2 months.; Holders of passports containing an Israeli stamp or visa will be refused entry in Lebanon.
Lesotho	Visa required		Pre-arranged visa may be picked up on arrival.
Liberia	e-VOA		May apply online and obtain a visa on arrival.; Visa on Arrival (VoA) can only be obtained at Roberts International Airport in Monrovia.
Libya	eVisa	30 days	Independent travel is not permitted, and visitors must organize their visit through a tour guide. A tourist police escort is required at all times.; An eVisa will not be granted without a sponsor or tour agency.; A security letter issued by the Libyan Immigration Authorities may also be required.; Holders of passports containing an Israeli stamp or visa will be refused entry in Libya.
Liechtenstein	Visa not required	90 days	90 days within any 180-day period in the Schengen Area.
Lithuania	Visa not required	90 days	90 days within any 180-day period in the Schengen Area.
Luxembourg	Visa not required	90 days	90 days within any 180-day period in the Schengen Area.
Madagascar	eVisa / Visa on arrival	60 days	
Malawi	eVisa	90 days	
Malaysia	Visa not required	30 days	The electronic Malaysia Digital Arrival Card must be submitted within three days before the date of arrival in Malaysia.
Maldives	Free visa on arrival	30 days	
Mali	Visa required		
Malta	Visa not required	90 days	90 days within any 180-day period in the Schengen Area.
Marshall Islands	Free visa on arrival	90 days	Visitors wishing to travel to Kwajalein Atoll are required to hold an Entry Authorization issued by the United States Military.; A visa exemption agreement was signed with Marshall Islands on 28 November 2019, but it has not yet ratified.
Mauritania	eVisa	30 days	
Mauritius	Visa not required	180 days	120 days within any calendar year for business purposes.; 180 days within any calendar year for tourist purposes.
Mexico	Electronic Travel Authorization	180 days	Electronic Authorization (Sistema de Autorización Electrónica, SAE) gives the right to enter the country only by air.; A visa is required to travel by land.; Visa not required for 180 days for holders of a valid visa from any Schengen area country, Canada, Japan, the United Kingdom or the United States.
Micronesia	Visa not required	30 days	Extension of stay is possible for up to 60 days.
Moldova	Visa not required	90 days	90 days within any 180-day period.; May enter with an ID card only for 1 entry from Ukraine and 1 exit to Ukraine.
Monaco	Visa not required	90 days	90 days within any 180-day period.
Mongolia	Visa required		Citizens of Ukraine do not need a visa for a maximum of 90 days if they have an official invitation issued by the Government of Mongolia or by a private institution in Mongolia.; A visa exemption agreement for holders of ordinary passports was signed with Mongolia on 8 November 2019, but it has not yet entered into force.
Montenegro	Visa not required	90 days	90 days within any 180-day period.
Morocco	Visa required		Citizens of Ukraine may obtain an eVisa if they have a valid visa or permanent residency document issued by one of the following countries: any Schengen Area country, Australia, Canada, Ireland, Japan, New Zealand, the United Arab Emirates, the United Kingdom or the United States.
Mozambique	Electronic Travel Authorization	30 days	Travelers must register on the e-Visa platform at least 48 hours prior to travel and pay a processing fee of 650 MT.; Extension of stay is possible for 30 days.
Myanmar	eVisa	28 days	e-Visa holders must arrive via Yangon, Nay Pyi Taw or Mandalay airports or via land border crossings with Thailand — Tachileik, Myawaddy and Kawthaung or India — Rih Khaw Dar and Tamu.; e-Visa available for both tourism or business purposes.
Namibia	eVisa / Visa on arrival	90 days	May be obtained online or on arrival for a fee of N$1,600 (approximately €82 / US$88).
Nauru	Visa required		Pre-arranged visa may be picked up on arrival.
Nepal	Online Visa / Visa on arrival	90 days	Extension of stay is possible for up to 150 days.; Business travellers may obtain a visa on arrival for a maximum stay of 5 years, subject to a fee and a license issued by the Ministry of Industry.
Netherlands	Visa not required	90 days	90 days within any 180-day period in the Schengen Area.
New Zealand	Online Visa		May apply online (Online Visitor visa).
Nicaragua	eVisa		A tourist card must be obtained on arrival for a fee.
Niger	Visa required		
Nigeria	eVisa	30 days	
North Macedonia	Visa not required	90 days	90 days within any 180-day period.
Norway	Visa not required	90 days	90 days within any 180-day period in the Schengen Area.
Oman	Visa not required eVisa	14 days / 30 days	
Pakistan	Online Visa	90 days	Online Visa eligible.; Issued in 7-10 business days.
Palau	Visa on arrival	30 days	Extension of stay is possible twice for 30 days for a fee.
Panama	Visa not required	90 days	Extension of stay is possible.
Papua New Guinea	eVisa	60 days	Visitors may apply for a visa online under the "Tourist - Own Itinerary" category.
Paraguay	Visa not required	90 days	
Peru	Visa not required	90 days	90 days within any 180-day period.; For tourist purposes only.
Philippines	eVisa		Citizens of Ukraine must select "Poland" in order to apply for an e-Visa if they are permanently residing in Ukraine, while those permanently residing abroad may apply for an e-Visa only if they reside in an eligible country where a Philippine Foreign Service Post is located.
Poland	Visa not required	90 days	90 days within any 180-day period in the Schengen Area.
Portugal	Visa not required	90 days	90 days within any 180-day period in the Schengen Area.
Qatar	eVisa / Free visa on arrival	90 days	Hotel reservations in one of the country's hotels made via Discover Qatar during the visit period must be confirmed.
Romania	Visa not required	90 days	90 days within any 180-day period in the Schengen Area.
Russia	Admission restricted Visa not required	90 days	Due to the Russian invasion of Ukraine, the Government of Ukraine strictly does not recommend its citizens of visiting Russia.; Citizens of Ukraine over 14 years old must arrive only through Sheremetyevo International Airport (Moscow). Citizens under 14 years old who are entering Russia alone or with a guardian who is a citizen of Russia are exempt from this requirement.; Citizens of Ukraine are interrogated by the Federal Security Service when they enter Russia.; 90 days within a calendar year.; ID card and some other listed documents are valid.; All listed documents that are considered valid for entry into Russia but expired are eligible for entry into Russia.; Birth certificate for citizens under 16 years old is valid.
Rwanda	eVisa / Visa on arrival	30 days	A visa on arrival is available for 30 days.; May also be entered on an East Africa Tourist Visa issued by Kenya or Uganda.
Saint Kitts and Nevis	Electronic Travel Authorization	90 days	
Saint Lucia	Visa required		Cruise ship passengers visiting for 1 day are exempted from obtaining a visa.
Saint Vincent and the Grenadines	Visa not required	3 months	Extension of stay is possible for a fee.
Samoa	Entry permit on arrival	90 days	
San Marino	Visa not required	90 days	90 days within any 180-day period.
São Tomé and Príncipe	eVisa		
Saudi Arabia	eVisa / Visa on arrival	90 days	
Senegal	Visa on arrival	1 month	Free visa on arrival.; Only available at Dakar Airport.
Serbia	Visa not required	90 days	90 days within any 180-day period.
Seychelles	Electronic Border System	3 months	Application can be submitted up to 30 days before travel.; Visitors must upload a reservation confirmation(s) for each visitor's location of stay in Seychelles.; Yellow fever vaccination certificate is required if coming from endemic countries.; Payment of the fee (EUR 10) by credit or debit card.; Valid for one journey only and it expires once exit the country.
Sierra Leone	eVisa	3 months	
Singapore	eVisa		May obtain the online e-Service through eligible through authorized travel agencies or through local sponsors (Singapore citizen or permanent residents).; Visa-free transit for 96 hours.
Slovakia	Visa not required	90 days	90 days within any 180-day period in the Schengen Area.
Slovenia	Visa not required	90 days	90 days within any 180-day period in the Schengen Area.
Solomon Islands	eVisa	3 months	
Somalia	eVisa	30 days	All visitors must have an approved Electronic Visa (eTAS) before the start of their journey.
South Africa	Electronic Travel Authorization	90 days	ETA must be obtained online in advance via the Department of Home Affairs portal; processing is expected within 24 hours.; The authorisation can be used for entry within 180 days of issuance for tourism or private visits.; Entry with an ETA is possible only through O. R. Tambo International Airport, Cape Town International Airport, Lanseria International Airport and King Shaka International Airport.
South Sudan	eVisa		Obtainable online 30 days single entry for 100 USD, 90 days multiple entry for 200 USD and 180 days multiple entry for 350 USD.; Printed visa authorization must be presented at the time of travel.
Spain	Visa not required	90 days	90 days within any 180-day period in the Schengen Area.
Sri Lanka	Electronic Travel Authorization	30 days	Sri Lanka introduced an ETA valid for 30 days.
Sudan	Visa required		
Suriname	Visa not required	90 days	An entrance fee of USD 50 or EUR 50 must be paid online prior to arrival.; Multiple entry e-Visa is also available.
Sweden	Visa not required	90 days	90 days within any 180-day period in the Schengen Area.
Switzerland	Visa not required	90 days	90 days within any 180-day period in the Schengen Area.
Syria	Visa on arrival	15 days	e-Visa website is not working.; Holders of passports containing an Israeli stamp or visa will be refused entry in Syria.
Tajikistan	Visa not required	90 days	
Tanzania	Online Visa / Visa on arrival	90 days	
Thailand	Visa not required	30 days	For tourist purposes only.; Extension of stay is possible for another 30 days for a fee.
Timor-Leste	Visa on arrival	30 days	Visa on arrival is only available at the Presidente Nicolau Lobato International Airport or at the Dili Sea Port.; Extension of stay is possible for up to 90 days for a fee.
Togo	eVisa	15 days	
Tonga	Free visa on arrival	31 days	Extension of stay is possible for up to 6 months.
Trinidad and Tobago	eVisa		
Tunisia	Visa required		Visa not required only if part of an organized tourist group.
Turkey	Visa not required	90 days	ID card valid.; 90 days within any 180-day period.
Turkmenistan	eVisa		Only through the event organiser or a tour agency. Independent travel remains prohibited.; 10-day visa on arrival if holding a letter of invitation provided by a company registered in Turkmenistan with a prior approval from the Foreign Ministry. Visitors can apply to extend their stay for an additional 10 days.; When transiting between two non-bordering countries, visitors can obtain a Turkmenistan transit visa for a five-day stay. This must be applied for in advance at the Turkmenistan Embassy. Visitors must also submit copies of the visas for the country of entry into Turkmenistan and the country of departure from Turkmenistan. Visa fee is 20 USD.
Tuvalu	Visa on arrival	1 month	
Uganda	eVisa	3 months	May apply online.; May also be entered on an East Africa Tourist Visa issued by Kenya or Rwanda.
United Arab Emirates	Visa not required	30 days	Extension of stay is possible for another 30 days for a fee.; Also, a 2-year freelance visa is available; renewable an unlimited number of times
United Kingdom	eVisa		
United States	Visa required		
Uruguay	Visa not required	90 days	Extension of stay is possible for an additional 90 days.
Uzbekistan	Visa not required	Unlimited	
Vanuatu	Visa not required	120 days	
Vatican City	Visa not required	90 days	90 days within any 180-day period.
Venezuela	eVisa		Introduction of Electronic Visa System for Tourist and Business Travelers.
Vietnam	eVisa	90 days	e-Visa is valid for 90 days and multiple entry.; Visa not required for 30 days on Phú Quốc Island.
Yemen	Visa required		Separately, Yemen introduced an e-Visa system for visitors who meet certain eligibility requirements (group travel of 10 or more people, business trips, and transit etc.).; Holders of passports containing an Israeli stamp or visa will be refused entry in Yemen.
Zambia	Visa not required	30 days	30 days within any 12-month period for business trips.; 90 days within any 12-month period for tourist trips.; Also eligible for a universal visa allowing access to Zimbabwe.
Zimbabwe	eVisa / Visa on arrival	1 month	30 days for business and tourist trips.; Extension of stay is possible for up to 90 days if the purpose is tourism.; Also eligible for a universal visa allowing access to Zambia.

=== Partially recognized or unrecognized countries ===
Territory	Conditions of access	Notes
Abkhazia	Prior entry permit	Citizens of Ukraine may enter Abkhazia without a visa for a period not exceeding 24 hours as part of an organized tourist group.
Kosovo	Visa not required	90 days within any 6-month period.
Northern Cyprus	Free visa on arrival	
State of Palestine	Visa not required	Arrival by sea to Gaza Strip not allowed.
Sahrawi Arab Democratic Republic	Undefined	Undefined visa regime in the Western Sahara controlled territory.
Somaliland	Visa on arrival	
South Ossetia	Prior entry permit	Need to receive approval from the South Ossetian government in advance of visit.
Taiwan	Visa required	
Transnistria	Admission restricted Visa not required	From 1 April 2023, free entry into the territory of Transnistria is prohibited for citizens of Ukraine of military age (from 18 to 60 years inclusive) male and female without the permission of the Ministry of State Security of Transnistria. The prohibition does not apply: 1. Citizens of Ukraine who have already entered the territory of the Transnistria after 24 February 2022.; 2. Citizens of Ukraine who are traveling to their wives, husbands, parents, children or siblings living in the territory of the Transnistria (kinship must be documented: Birth Certificate, Marriage Certificate, etc.).; Citizens of Ukraine may obtain a permission on the basis of an electronic or written application sent by the receiving party (citizens Transnistria). The permit is issued within 10 days (actually within 3 working days).

=== Dependent and autonomous territories ===
Territory	Conditions of access	Notes
Australia
(Australia) Ashmore and Cartier Islands	Special authorisation required	Special authorisation required.
(Australia) Macquarie Island	Special authorisation permit	A written authorisation of the Director of National Parks and Wildlife is required.
Norfolk Island	Online Visa	May apply online. Passports and visas are not required when travelling from the Australian mainland. However, photographic identification must be produced for clearance through Customs and Immigration. Normal Australian Customs and Immigration procedures apply when entry is made from outside Australia. Passenger not carrying their passports aren't eligible to purchase duty-free goods on Norfolk Island.
Christmas Island	Online Visa	May apply online. Passports and visas are not required when travelling from the Australian mainland. However, photographic identification must be produced for clearance through Customs and Immigration. Normal Australian Customs and Immigration procedures apply when entry is made from outside Australia.
Cocos (Keeling) Islands	Online Visa	May apply online. Passports and visas are not required when travelling from the Australian mainland. However, photographic identification must be produced for clearance through Customs and Immigration. Normal Australian Customs and Immigration procedures apply when entry is made from outside Australia.
China
Hong Kong	Visa not required	14 days
Macau	Visa on arrival	30 days
Denmark
Faroe Islands	Visa not required	90 days
Greenland	Visa not required	90 days
Finland
Aland	Visa not required	90 days within any 180-day period.
France
Clipperton Island	Special permit required	
French Guiana	Visa not required	90 days within any 180-day period.
French Polynesia	Visa not required	90 days within any 180 day period.
Guadeloupe,	Visa not required	90 days within any 180-day period.
Martinique	Visa not required	90 days within any 180-day period.
Saint Barthélemy	Visa not required	90 days within any 180-day period.
Saint Martin	Visa not required	90 days within any 180-day period.
Mayotte	Visa not required	90 days within any 180-day period.
New Caledonia	Visa not required	90 days within any 180-day period.
Réunion	Visa not required	90 days within any 180-day period.
Saint Pierre and Miquelon	Visa not required	90 days within any 180-day period.
Wallis and Futuna	Visa not required	90 days within any 180-day period.
Netherlands
Aruba	Visa not required	30 days Extension is possible for up to 180 days per calendar year.
Bonaire	Visa not required	90 days within any 180-day period.
Sint Eustatius	Visa not required	90 days within any 180-day period.
Saba	Visa not required	90 days within any 180-day period.
Curaçao	Visa not required	30 days, but no more than 90 days within any 365-day period.
Sint Maarten	Visa not required	90 days within any 180-day period.
New Zealand
Cook Islands	Visa not required	31 days Each extension is possible for an additional period of 31 days, with a maximum limit of 6 months.
Niue	Visa required	
Tokelau	Permit required	
Norway
Norway Jan Mayen	Permit required	Permit issued by the local police required for staying for less than 24 hours and permit issued by the Norwegian police for staying for more than 24 hours.
(Norway) Svalbard	Visa not required	The Svalbard Treaty allows everyone to live and work in Svalbard indefinitely, regardless of country of citizenship.
Portugal
Azores	Visa not required	90 days within any 180-day period.
Madeira	Visa not required	90 days within any 180-day period.
Spain
Canary Islands	Visa not required	90 days within any 180-day period.
Ceuta	Visa not required	90 days within any 180-day period.
Melilla	Visa not required	90 days within any 180-day period.
United Kingdom
Akrotiri and Dhekelia	Visa not required	28 days within any 12-month period. Stay longer than 28 days per 12-month period require a permit.
Anguilla	eVisa	Holders of a valid visa/residence permit issued by Canada, the United Kingdom or the United States may enter without a visa for up to 3 months.
Bermuda	Visa required	Must have a multiple-entry visa of Canada, United Kingdom or the United States valid for at least 45 days beyond the period of intended stay in Bermuda. If the condition is met, stay is possible for up to 180 days within any 12-month period.
British Indian Ocean Territory	Special permit required	
British Virgin Islands	Visa required	Holders of a valid visa issued by Canada, the United Kingdom or the United States may enter without a visa for up to 6 months. Cruise ship passengers do not need a visa for stays of up to 24 hours. Citizens of Ukraine visiting by mega yacht, without sanctions, may enter without a visa for up to two weeks.
Cayman Islands	Visa required	Holders of a permanent residence permit of Canada, the United Kingdom or the United States may enter without a visa for up to 30 days.
Falkland Islands (Malvinas)	Visa required	
Gibraltar	Visa not required	90 days within any 180-day period.
Montserrat	eVisa	Holders of a valid visa of any European Union country, Canada, the United Kingdom or the United States may enter without a visa for up to 6 months.
Pitcairn Islands	Visa not required	14 days
Saint Helena	eVisa	183 days
Ascension Island	Admission refused	From May 2015, the Ascension Island Government does not issue visas (including e-Visas) to citizens of Ukraine.
Tristan da Cunha	Permission required	Permission to land required for 15/30 pounds sterling (yacht / ship passenger) for Tristan da Cunha Island or 20 pounds sterling for Gough Island, Inaccessible Island or Nightingale Islands.
South Georgia and the South Sandwich Islands	Permit required	Pre-arrival permit from the Commissioner required (72 hours/1 month for 110/160 pounds sterling).
Turks and Caicos Islands	Visa required	Holders of a valid visa or residence permit issued by Canada, the United Kingdom or United States may enter without a visa for up to 90 days.
United States
American Samoa	Entry permit required	
Guam	Visa required	
Northern Mariana Islands	Visa required	
Puerto Rico	Visa required	
U.S. Virgin Islands	Visa required	
Antarctica and adjacent islands
Special permits required for Bouvet Island, British Antarctic Territory, French Southern and Antarctic Lands, Argentine Antarctica, (Australia) Australian Antarctic Territory, (Antártica Chilena Province) Chilean Antarctic Territory, (Australia) Heard Island and McDonald Islands, (Norway) Peter I Island, (Norway) Queen Maud Land, (New Zealand) Ross Dependency.

=== Other territories ===
- Colombia. San Andrés and Leticia - Visitors arriving at Gustavo Rojas Pinilla International Airport and Alfredo Vásquez Cobo International Airport must buy a tourist card on arrival.
- Ecuador. Galápagos - Online pre-registration is required. Transit Control Card must also be obtained at the airport prior to departure.

=== Disputed or restricted territories ===
- China. Tibet Autonomous Region - Tibet Travel Permit required (USD 10).
- Eritrea outside Asmara - To travel in the rest of the country, a Travel Permit for Foreigners is required (20 Eritrean nakfa).
- Fiji. Lau Province - Special permission required.
- Greece. Mount Athos – Special permit required (4 days: EUR 25 for Orthodox visitors, EUR 35 for non-Orthodox visitors, EUR 18 for students). There is a visitors' quota: maximum 100 Orthodox and 10 non-Orthodox per day and women are not allowed.
- India. Protected Area Permit (PAP) required for whole states of Nagaland and Sikkim and parts of states Manipur, Arunachal Pradesh, Uttaranchal, Jammu and Kashmir, Rajasthan, Himachal Pradesh. Restricted Area Permit (RAP) required for all of Andaman and Nicobar Islands and parts of Sikkim. Some of these requirements are occasionally lifted for a year.
- Iraq. Kurdistan Region - e-Visa for 30 days through a guarantor (local sponsor) registered with the Ministry of Interior.
- Kazakhstan. Closed cities – Special permission required for the town of Baikonur and surrounding areas in Kyzylorda Oblast, and the town of Gvardeyskiy near Almaty.
- North Korea outside Pyongyang - Special permit required. People are not allowed to leave the capital city, tourists can only leave the capital with a governmental tourist guide (no independent moving).
- Malaysia. Sabah and Sarawak - Visa not required. These states have their own immigration authorities and passport is required to travel to them, however the same visa applies.
- Maldives outside Malé - Permission required. Tourists are generally prohibited from visiting non-resort islands without the express permission of the Government of Maldives.
- (Saudi Arabia) Mecca and Medina - Special access required. Non-Muslims and those following the Ahmadiyya religious movement are strictly prohibited from entry.
- Sudan. Darfur - Separate travel permit is required.
- Sudan outside Khartoum - All foreigners traveling more than 25 kilometers outside of Khartoum must obtain a travel permit.
- Tajikistan. Gorno-Badakhshan Autonomous Province – OIVR permit required (15+5 Tajikistani Somoni) and another special permit (free of charge) is required for Lake Sarez.
- Turkmenistan. Closed cities – A special permit, issued prior to arrival by Ministry of Foreign Affairs, is required if visiting the following places: Atamurat, Cheleken, Dashoguz, Serakhs and Serhetabat.
- United States. Closed city of Mercury, Nevada, United States – Special authorization is required for entry into Mercury.
- United States. United States Minor Outlying Islands - Special permits required for Baker Island, Howland Island, Jarvis Island, Johnston Atoll, Kingman Reef, Midway Atoll, Palmyra Atoll and Wake Island.
- Yemen outside Sana'a or Aden – Special permission needed for travel outside Sana'a or Aden.
- (United Nations) UN Buffer Zone in Cyprus – Access Permit is required for travelling inside the zone, except Civil Use Areas.
- (United Nations) Korean Demilitarized Zone - Restricted area.
- (United Nations) UNDOF Zone and Ghajar - Restricted area.

== Limitations ==
Visitors with passport stamp of Israel are not allowed to enter a number of countries because of the Arab League boycott of Israel.

== Vaccination ==
Many African countries, including Angola, Benin, Burkina Faso, Cameroon, Central African Republic, Chad, Democratic Republic of the Congo, Republic of the Congo, Côte d'Ivoire, Equatorial Guinea, Gabon, Ghana, Guinea, Liberia, Mali, Mauritania, Niger, Rwanda, São Tomé and Príncipe, Senegal, Sierra Leone, Uganda, Zambia require all incoming passengers to have a current International Certificate of Vaccination. Some other countries require vaccination only if the passenger is coming from an infected area.

== Passport validity ==
Many countries require passport validity of no less than 6 months and one or two blank pages.

== See also ==
- Visa policy of Ukraine
- Ukrainian passport
- Foreign relations of Ukraine
