= Serdiuk =

Serdiuk is a Ukrainian surname. It may refer to:

- Fedir Serdiuk, Ukrainian entrepreneur
- Kateryna Serdiuk (born 1989), Ukrainian cross-country skier
- Yeva Serdiuk (born 2004), Ukrainian beach volleyball player
- Yevhenii Serdiuk (born 1998), commonly known as Jeka, Ukrainian professional footballer
- Zinovie Serdiuk (1903–1982), former Soviet politician

== See also ==
- Serdyuk
