= Oksana Ferchuk =

Ukrainian politician

- Оксана Ферчук
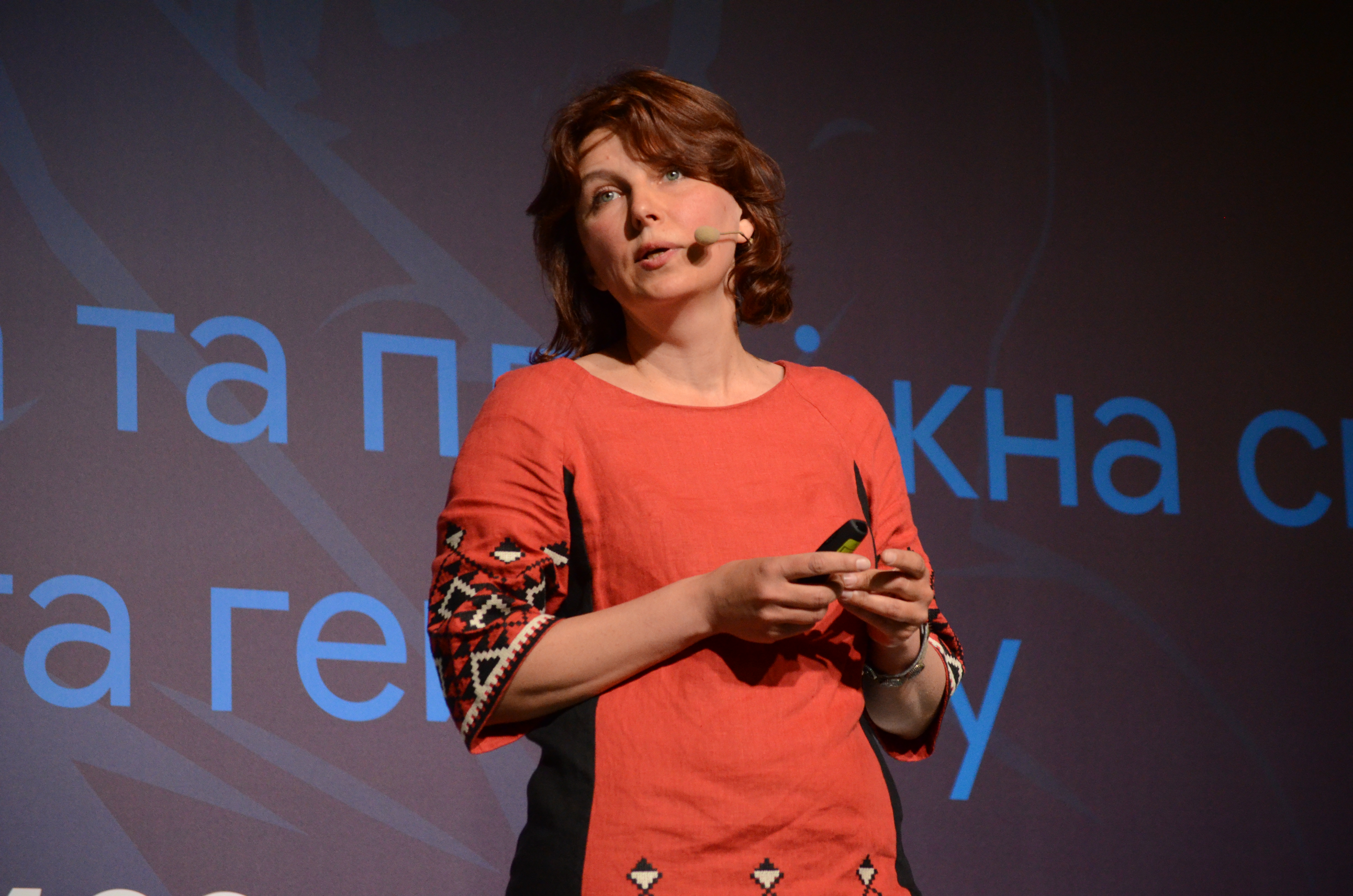
- Ferchuk in 2018

Minister of Digital Transformation
- Incumbent
- Assumed office 16 July 2026
- President: Volodymyr Zelenskyy
- Prime Minister: Serhii Koretskyi
- Preceded by: Oleksandr Bornyakov (acting); Mykhailo Fedorov

Personal details
- Born: 27 April 1973 (age 53) Simferopol, Crimean Oblast, Ukrainian SSR, Soviet Union (now Ukraine)
- Party: Independent

Oksana Vitaliivna Ferchuk (Ukrainian: Оксана Віталіївна Ферчук; born 27 April 1973) is a Ukrainian politician serving as minister of digital transformation since 2026. From 2025 to 2026, she served as deputy minister of defence for digital transformation.

== Career ==
Ferchuk is a native of Simferopol, Crimea. In 1997, she graduated fom the Kyiv-Mohyla Academy. Following her graduation, she worked as a manager in the private sector. In 2022, she was appointed as an advisor to the Ukrainian Ministry of Defence.
