= Impact Force =

Ukrainian non-governmental organization

- Founded: 2021
- Type: Non-governmental organization
- Headquarters: Ukraine
- Website: theimpactforce.org

Impact Force is a Ukrainian non-governmental women-founded and led NGO, focused on social behaviour change. It was founded in 2021 by Nina Levchuk and Olga Diakova to ensure an inclusive and sustainable rebuilding of Ukraine. It is a partner of UN Women and World Economic Forum.

The organization's vision is to see a prosperous Ukraine, progressing in the modern world, driven by its people and dedication to the UN Sustainable Development Goals. Its mission is to promote positive social behaviour change and create economic opportunities that support Ukraine's sustainable and inclusive recovery.

== History ==
Impact Force was founded in 2021 by Nina Levchuk and Olga Diakova.

In 2023, Impact Force participated in organizing the Kyiv Investment Forum: Brussels Platform, took part in the events of the World Economic Forum (WEF) in Davos, conducted research on the role of the social impact economy in Ukraine's path toward integration into the European Union (EU), and also studied the role of the digital economy in supporting the livelihoods of displaced Ukrainian women.

Among Impact Force’s programs during 2023–2024 were the Impact Business accelerator, the online academy for women "Dream and Achieve", the "Innovators of Energy Efficiency in Ukraine" program, and the educational and wellness program "ReSTART Mindset" aimed at addressing the mental health crisis in Ukraine. During 2023–2024, Impact Force launched several communities, such as the Impact Business community, a community for Ukrainian women entrepreneurs and displaced persons, and a community of energy innovators in Ukraine, providing hundreds of entrepreneurs with platforms for collaboration and mutual support.

In 2024, the organization held Impact Force Forum 2024. Impact Force participated in events at the World Economic Forum (WEF) in Davos, at the Women Leaders Summit 2024 in Warsaw, and at the “Vilna” forum organized by Forbes Ukraine.

=== Impact Business Accelerator Program 2023 ===
In January 2023, Impact Force initiated an accelerator program for Ukrainian entrepreneurs seeking to contribute to the recovery of the sectors most affected by the war through social impact initiatives. Participants in Impact Business gained access to live lectures, workshops, research, mentors, and investors to help launch their projects. The first edition of Impact Business lasted nine months, involving 23 Ukrainian companies, two of which received €20,000 each for business development.

The program was implemented by Impact Force in partnership with SILab Ukraine and supported by the Ministry of Digital Transformation of Ukraine, the Office of Entrepreneurship and Export Development, and the national Diia.Business project.

=== "Dream and Achieve" Online Academy 2023 ===
In 2023, Impact Force, together with UN Women and with the support of the Ministry of Digital Transformation, launched an educational program (online academy) for displaced Ukrainian women in Ukraine and Poland – "Dream and Achieve". The project is focused on providing Ukrainian women with the necessary entrepreneurial and digital skills to improve their standard of living, economic self-sufficiency, and financial stability. The first cohort of "Dream and Achieve" took place in December 2023. Eighty displaced Ukrainian women gained the knowledge needed to start or relaunch an online business, as well as vouchers worth $1,000 for developing their own enterprise.

=== "Innovators of Energy Efficiency in Ukraine" Program 2024 ===
In December 2023, Impact Force, supported by the project "Promotion of Energy Efficiency and Implementation of the EU Energy Efficiency Directive in Ukraine"—carried out by GIZ on behalf of the Government of Germany and co-financed by the Government of Switzerland—in collaboration with the Ministry of Digital Transformation of Ukraine, the Office of Entrepreneurship and Export Development, the national Diia.Business project, and the State Agency for Energy Efficiency, launched a comprehensive accelerator program called "Innovators of Energy Efficiency in Ukraine".

=== "ReStart Mindset" Program 2024 ===
On 15 February 2024, the educational and wellness program "ReStart Mindset" was launched, aimed at developing and restoring the mental health of female veterans and their family members. The program consists of two main modules: the first focuses on mental health—including medical examinations, non-pharmacological techniques to improve sleep and emotional well-being, and mentoring support—while the second module is oriented toward career development, offering HR expert support, training in new professional skills, and the creation of a community for support and networking. The program was implemented by Impact Force in partnership with UN Women.

=== Impact Force Forum 2024 ===
On 21 May 2024, the Impact Force Forum 2024 took place in Kyiv, where Ukrainian and international experts discussed issues related to the war as well as opportunities for Ukraine's recovery and sustainable development.
