= Dmytro Shymkiv =

Ukrainian businessman

- Дмитро Шимків

Deputy head of the Presidential Administration of Ukraine

Personal details
- Born: 28 September 1975 (age 50) Lviv, Ukrainian SSR, Soviet Union
- Education: Lviv Polytechnic National University
- Known for: Еxecutive chairman of Darnitsa Group (since September 19, 2018 till June 2022)

Dmytro Anatoliyovych Shymkiv (Ukrainian: Дмитро Анатолійович Ши́мків; born 28 September 1975) is a Ukrainian businessman. He was executive chairman of Darnitsa Group (2018–2022), vice-chairman of the Presidential Administration of Ukraine (from 9 July 2014 until 31 August 2018), and ex-CEO of Microsoft Ukraine.

== Early life and education ==
Dmytro Anatoliyovych Shymkiv was born on 28 September 1975 in Lviv, Ukrainian SSR, Soviet Union.

In 1997, he graduated with honors from Lviv Polytechnic National University. There he got a degree in radio electronics, information technology and telecommunications. During his studies, Shymkiv initiated the creation of "PolyNet", which became one of the first university computer networks in Ukraine.

== Career ==
Between 1998 and 2007, Shymkiv managed IT companies and an international team of software developers. In 1998 he moved to Copenhagen, where he worked for ALTA Copenhagen. After returning to Ukraine, Shymkiv founded Alfa Team in 2000, which he sold to the Danish corporation ALTA A/S two years later. Alfa Team became ALTA Eastern Europe, where Shymkiv headed the R&D department of ALTA A/S and led a team of developers in Denmark, Ukraine and the USA.

Between 2007 and 2014, Shymkiv worked at Microsoft Ukraine. From March 2007 to May 2009, he managed sales in the corporate segment. In two years, the sales level has grown by 60%. In May 2009, Shymkiv became CEO of Microsoft in Ukraine. The branch has been recognized as one of the company's most successful branches several times, in particular in 2011 it became the best division in the world.

From July 2014 to August 2018, Shymkiv worked as Vice-chairman of the Presidential Administration of Ukraine. He was responsible for administrative, social and economic reforms, in particular one of the first tasks was the introduction of e-government in the Presidential Administration. Among his achievements are evangelizing the electronic public procurement system ProZorro, establishing National Reform Council and Project Management Office for reforms, drafting President’s strategy for sustainable development "Ukraine 2020", promotion of the launch of a 3G / 4G mobile connection, creation of initiatives like "Digital Ukraine" and "GoGlobal" (nationwide learning of English), creation of electronic petitions service to the President of Ukraine, etc.

Since September 2018, Shymkiv has been working for the pharmaceutical company Darnitsa Group, where he is the head of the company’s management board. His responsibilities include international relations, strategic planning, development and implementation of new technologies. He believes that pharmacy is a much more attractive and productive industry than IT.

== Other activities ==
Shymkiv has been a member of various public, non-profit, and commercial organizations: the AIESEC Council in Ukraine (since 2003), the Foreign Investment Expert at the Advisory Council to the President of Ukraine (2005-2007), the Bohdan Hawrylyshyn Charitable Foundation and the American Chamber of Commerce in Ukraine (since 2010), member of the Young Presidents' Organization (since 2011) and of the supervisory board of Lviv Polytechnic National University (since 2012), member of ASPEN Ukraine (since 2014), supervisory boards of the Ukrainian Startup Fund (since 2019) and Kyivstar (since 2020) etc.

During the Euromaidan (protests in Ukraine 2013–4), Shymkiv was one of the first representatives of the Ukrainian IT business that sharply criticized the government's actions. He temporarily resigned as CEO of Microsoft Ukraine and went to the Maidan to defend the rights and freedoms of compatriots.

== Recognition ==
According to Oleksiy Bilovil, in 2014 Shymkiv became the main reformer of the Administration of the President of Ukraine, in particular he initiated the fastest launch of 3G in Ukraine. By citation Shymkiv was the leader in his team.

According to the publication Vlast deneg ("Power of Money") in 2020, "Darnitsa" company was included in the list of 25 leaders in digitalization in Ukraine due to the introduction of new technologies. Shymkiv is responsible for this sector.

In 2010, the magazine "TOP-100. Rating of the best companies in Ukraine" ranked Shymkiv among the best top managers (№30).

In 2011, Shymkiv was included in the TOP-15 best managers of Ukraine according to the Korrespondent magazine.

In 2012, according to the publishing house "Economy" and the magazine "TOP-100. Rating of the best companies in Ukraine", Shymkiv, together with O. Vadatursky, became the best top managers of Ukraine.

In 2013, Shymkiv was named one of the ten best top managers in Ukraine (according to "Investgazeta" magazine).

In 2020, Shymkiv was named one of the Ukrainians who shares useful knowledge about business, pharmaceuticals, and innovation (№18 in the "TOP 100 Most Inspiring Ukrainians").

== Personal life ==
As of 2013, Shymkiv was married. He has three children.
