= Ministry of Digital Transformation (Ukraine) =

Government ministry of Ukraine

Agency overview
- Formed: 29 August 2019
- Preceding agency: State Agency on E-governance in Ukraine
- Jurisdiction: Government of Ukraine
- Headquarters: Dilova Street, 24, Kyiv
- Minister responsible: Oksana Ferchuk
- Website: https://thedigital.gov.ua/

The Ministry of Digital Transformation (Ukrainian: Міністерство цифрової трансформації України, romanized: Ministerstvo tsyfrovoyi transformatsiyi Ukrayiny, IPA: [min⁽ʲ⁾iˈstɛrstwo tsɪfroˈwɔji trɐnsforˈmɑts⁽ʲ⁾iji ʊkrɐˈjinɪ]) is a government ministry in Ukraine that was established on 29 August 2019 when Mykhailo Fedorov was appointed as Minister of Digital Transformation in the Honcharuk Government.

== History ==
The ministry was established on 29 August 2019 when Mykhailo Fedorov was appointed as Minister of Digital Transformation in the Honcharuk Government.

In September 2019, it was stated that the ministry's most important project was the so-called "state in a smartphone" project that was aiming that 100% of all government services should be available online with 20% of services provided automatically, without the intervention of an official, and 1 online fill-in form to receive a package of services "in any life situation" by 2024. On 5 November 2019, Minister of Digital Transformation Fedorov wrote on Facebook that the "state in a smartphone" project would not be funded by the state budget in 2020 (but he hoped it would be in 2021) but that it would rely "on an effective team and international technical assistance, public-private partnerships, volunteering". The following day Prime Minister Oleksiy Honcharuk stressed that each government ministry had planned expenditures for digitization and that the Ministry of Digital Transformation did have a separate budget and thus the state budget was sufficient to launch the "state in a smartphone" project in 2020. On 21 March 2023, Fedorov continued his ministerial post, but with an extended portfolio: Deputy Prime Minister for Innovation, Education, Science and Technology - Minister for Digital Transformation.

== Activities and responsibilities ==
=== Aims ===
The Ministry of Digital Transformation is working to create a "state in a smartphone" that combines a mobile application and a public services portal. One of the important tasks of the Ministry is the development of digital literacy of citizens, which is why on 21 January 2020, the Ministry of Digital Transformation launched courses on digital education.

The goals of the ministry by 2024:

- transfer 100% of all public services for citizens and businesses online
- provide 95% of transport infrastructure, settlements and their social facilities with access to high-speed Internet
- tteach six million Ukrainians digital skills
- increase the share of IT in the country's GDP to 10%

=== Electronic services ===
The Ministry of Digital Transformation of Ukraine, together with other public authorities and international partners, promotes the introduction of electronic services in many areas of the economy, including construction, land services, ecology, business registration, subsidies, and state aid.

On 6 February 2020, the mobile app and web portal Diia ("Action") were officially launched, as a universal access point for citizens and businesses to all electronic government services.

=== Open data ===
The Ministry of Digital Transformation of Ukraine is the state body responsible for implementing the policy of open data, with regard to disclosure of the most important data for society. In October 2016, Ukraine formally acceded to the International Open Data Charter, committing itself to the international community to implement a national open data policy in accordance with the principles of the Charter.

Open data has a strong anti-corruption effect, promotes government transparency, and has a positive impact on economic development.

=== Ukrainian Startup Fund ===
Since 2023, the Ukrainian Startup Fund has been managed by theMinistry of Digital Transformation, after it had been under the control of the Ministry of Finance since 2019. The USF to helps tech startups in raising funds early in the development of new projects.

== Response to 2022 invasion ==
Within three days of the invasion, the ministry organised a campaign to pressurise technology companies to boycott Russia. They have also secured access to Starlink and recruited the IT Army of Ukraine. Together with Kuna.io cryptocurrency exchange from Ukraine and itc CEO Michael Chobanian the Ministry initiated the creation of the largest fundraising cryptofund in the world called Crypto Fund for Ukraine aimed to help the Armed Forces of Ukraine combat Russian invasion.

In May 2022, Diia App organized the voting on the whether Ukrainians should own weapons, which was initiated by the Minister of Internal Affairs of Ukraine, Denys Monastyrskyi. Almost 59% of respondents voted to allow weapons for personal protection.

In April 2023 the Brave1 platform was unveiled, designed as a meeting place to bring experts together who can turn ideas and prototypes into workable weapons. Three months later, in June 2023, the ministry publicly backed Impact Force's "Dream and Achieve" online academy, which aims to provide digital skill education to women displaced by the invasion.

== List of ministers ==
Name of minister	Term of office		Photo
Name of minister	Start	End	Photo
Mykhailo Fedorov	29 August 2019	13 January 2026	
Oleksandr Bornyakov	14 January 2026	16 July 2026	
Oksana Ferchuk	16 July 2026	Present	

== See also ==
- Honcharuk Government
- Shmygal Government
- Delta (situational awareness system)
- Starlink satellite services in Ukraine
