= Anastasiya (Stacy) Pavlyshyna =

Ukrainian entrepreneur and digital marketing specialist

- Born: 1994 (age 30–31); Ukraine
- Education: Taras Shevchenko National University of Kyiv
- Occupation(s): Entrepreneur and digital marketing specialist
- Known for: Co-founder of Awesomic

Stacy Pavlyshyna (also known as Anastasiya Pavlyshyna) is a Ukrainian entrepreneur, digital marketing specialist, and technology executive. She is the co-founder and Chief Operating Officer (COO) of Awesomic, an AI-powered platform that connects companies with designers and developers on demand.

== Early life and education ==
Stacy Pavlyshyna graduated from school early, at 15, and same age entered both universities. Stacy Pavlyshyna holds a Bachelor of Arts in Advertising and Public Relations from Taras Shevchenko National University of Kyiv and a Bachelor's degree in Translation and Interpreting (English) from Kyiv National Linguistics University.

== Career ==
Pavlyshyna began her career as a Press Secretary and PR Manager for Olympic champion Stella Zakharova in 2013. From 2014 to 2015, she worked as a digital marketing manager at Livingston Research. In 2015, she joined myBOOKmark, first as a PR/digital marketing manager and later as head of marketing.

In 2017, Stacy Pavlyshyna founded Doge Codes, an online platform offering programming courses. In 2019, Pavlyshyna, together with Roman Sevastyanov, co-founded Awesomic. The company provides an AI-driven solution that matches businesses with the best-fit designers and developers, delivering results within 24 hours. Pavlyshyna has served as COO since its inception, overseeing operations and marketing.

In 2021, Pavlyshyna was included in Forbes Ukraine’s “25 Women in IT”, and in Forbes 30 under 30. At the same year, Awesomic won award as the fastest growing startup in Ukraine at Ukrainian Startup Awards.

As of 2023, the startup has raised over $2.1 million in funding and expanded its team to more than 100 employees.

By mid-2025, over 4000 global companies had used her startup to find designers, engineers and other contractors with a client base primarily in the United States.
