= Ukrainian Travel Document of a Child =

The Ukrainian Travel Document of a child is a former document used for travel abroad which is issued to Ukrainian citizens under the age of 18 (16 in some cases).

The Travel Document of a Child is issued for 3 years and it has only 8 (or 16 or 32 pages in theory). The Travel Document of Child is actually an international passport (PR sub-type). It satisfies the international standards; for example, it has two machine-readable strings at the bottom of the first page. Similar to a Ukrainian passport, the information in the document is given in Ukrainian and English. The Travel Document of a Child is issued with a color photo.

The first and last name in the Travel Document of a Child by default is transliterated from Ukrainian to English according to the national transliteration system (1996). However, a person's parent has an option to request the desired English spelling of his child's first and last name.

It is required to provide a notary sealed request from both parents to obtain the Travel Document of a Child.

Since March 1, 2015 travel document of a child is no longer issued.
