= Fedir Serdiuk =

Ukrainian charity executive

- Born: June 2, 1995 (age 31); Odesa, Ukraine
- Known for: Entrepreneur, emergency responder, humanitarian

Fedir Serdiuk is a Ukrainian entrepreneur focused on solving safety challenges. He is a co-founder of FAST (First Aid and Special Training), a first aid training provider in Ukraine, and PULSE, a charity focused on developing of tactical combat casualty care in Ukraine since the 2022 Russian invasion of Ukraine.

== Early life and education ==
Fedir Serdiuk was born on June 2, 1995, in Odesa. His paternal grandfather, Serdiuk Viktor Vasyliovych, was a Ukrainian physicist and the head of Odesa University, while his maternal grandfather, Abalakin Viktor Kuzmovych, was a Soviet astronomer.

Serdiuk graduated from the Faculty of Economics and Law of Odesa University, having received a specialist degree in Law. In 2014, he undertook first aid training and later led the Red Cross rapid response team in Odesa. Serdiuk also studied with instructors from the Czech Republic and the USA. He headed the tactical and medical training of the patrol police in the south and east of Ukraine. In the same year, he participated in the Medsanbat project in the war zone.

== Career ==
Serdiuk is an Ukrainian entrepreneur focused on solving safety challenges and the defence of Ukraine, and an emergency responder expert.

He organized first aid courses for military personnel in the ATO zone, providing tactical medicine training to soldiers of the Armed Forces of Ukraine, the Special Operations Forces, and volunteer battalions.

Serdiuk is a certified instructor of the California Emergency Medical Services Authority and a certified trainer of first aid instructors for the Ukrainian Red Cross Society.

=== FAST ===
In 2016, together with Igor Korpusov, he founded a first aid training organization FAST (First Aid and Special Training).

More than 200 international and local businesses among its clients (including PepsiCo, Red Bull, Carlsberg, and Citibank) are among FAST customers.

The FAST team also developed the "Dzhgut 2.0" (Джгут 2.0) chatbot, which provides first responders with online step-by-step first aid guidelines adjusted to their level of training.

=== PULSE ===
At the beginning of the Russian invasion of Ukraine in 2022, Serdiuk, together with Igor Korpusov and Leonid Kopus, co-founded PULSE — a charity with a mission to support the development of emergency and combat medicine in the Armed Forces of Ukraine. PULSE is a trusted training provider in emergency medical services, as acknowledged by the Ukrainian Ministry of Defence, Air Force, Emergency Service, National Guard, and other state institutions.

In January 2023, PULSE became an authorized training center of the NAEMT (National Association of Emergency Medical Technicians), offering training following standards akin to those used by the U.S. Armed Forces.

In June 2023, the 3rd Separate Special Purpose Regiment named after Prince Svyatoslav Khorobroy, and the 73rd Maritime Special Operations Center named after Kish Otaman Antin Holovaty informed that their operators had been training at PULSE.

By December 2023, PULSE had trained more than 22,000 soldiers, officers, medics, and rescuers in every region of Ukraine.

In autumn 2023, PULSE announced a historic partnership with the Estonian Armed Forces and NATO troops via cooperation with the Estonian Military Academy, Centre for War and Disaster Medicine. PULSE became the first Ukrainian organization to train the Estonian Armed Forces, marking a significant milestone in military-medical cooperation between the two nations.

== Other activities ==
Serdiuk has served as a board member of the Ukrainian Startup Fund, and as an advisor to the Minister of Finance of Ukraine.

In 2015 Serdiuk joined World Economic Forum (WEF) Global Shapers Community. In 2019 and 2022 he participated in the WEF annual meeting in Davos.

== Recognition ==
Serdiuk was included in the 2022 Forbes Europe "30 under 30" for social impact.

In December 2024, he was called a "frontline medicine prodigy" by The Baltic Sentinel, which published an interview with him.

He is the subject of an interview in the Ukrainian magazine Leadership Daily in June 2026.
