= Oleksandr Bornyakov =

Ukrainian politician

- Олександр Борняков
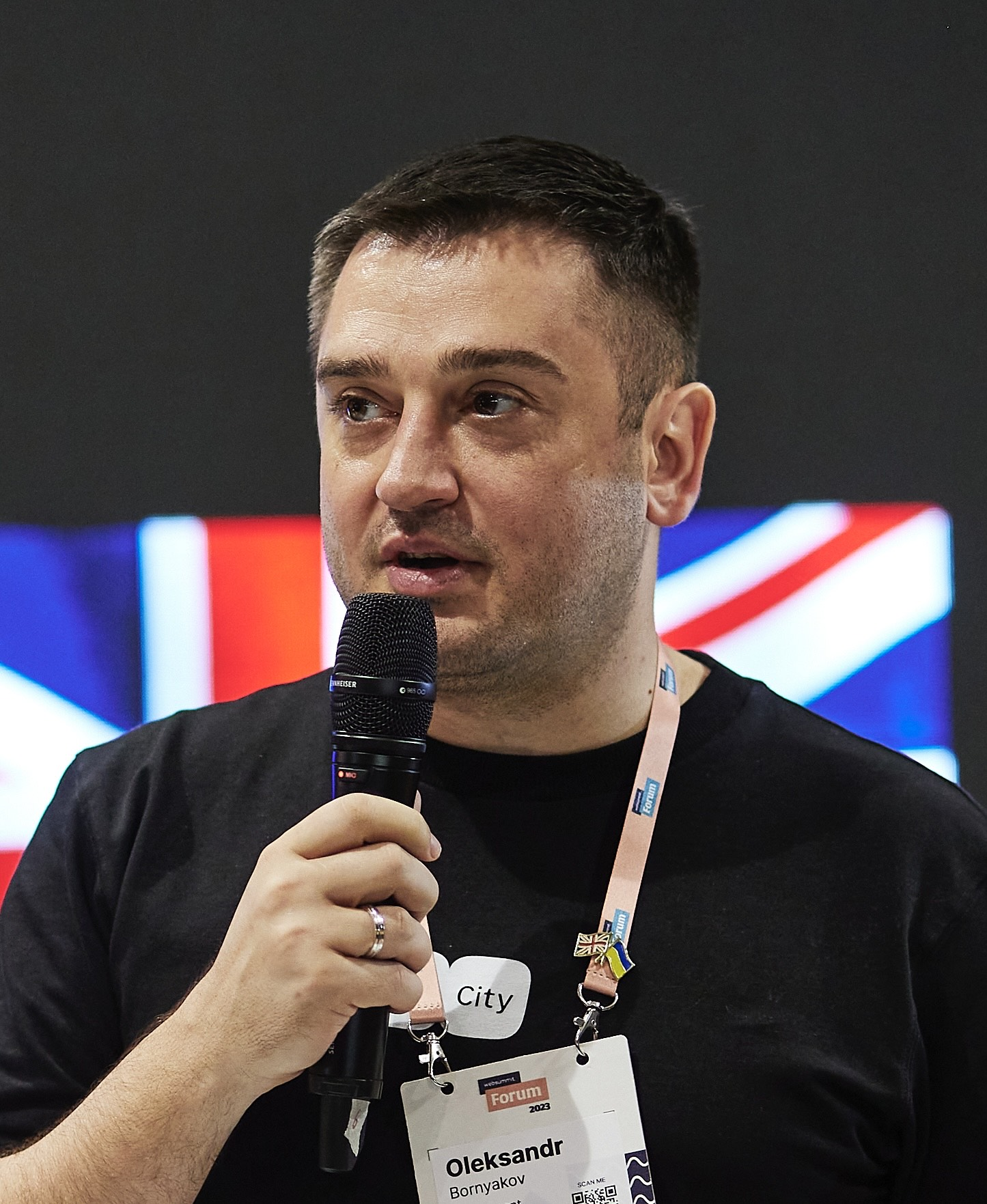
- Bornyakov in 2023
- Born: Bolhrad, Odesa Oblast, Ukrainian SSR, Soviet Union
- Education: Kyiv National Aviation University; University of New Brunswick (MBA); Columbia University (MPA)

Oleksandr Serhiyovych Bornyakov (Ukrainian: Олександр Сергійович Борняков) is a Ukrainian politician. He was appointed acting Minister of Digital Transformation of Ukraine in January 2026. Bornyakov was previously the Deputy Minister of Digital Transformation on IT industry development, head of the Diia.City project, and co-founder of the WannaBiz business accelerator.

== Early life and education ==
Oleksandr Serhiyovych Bornyakov was born in Bolhrad, Odesa Oblast, Ukrainian SSR, Soviet Union.

He studied at the National Aviation University in Kyiv, graduating with a degree in marketing. He also holds an MBA from the University of New Brunswick, Canada as well as MPA from Columbia University.

== Career in business ==
In 2007, Bornyakov established SoftTechnics, a software development company. In 2014, he became a board chairman at Intersog Ukraine firm after SoftTechnics was acquired by Chicago-based company Intersog.

In 2008, Oleksandr founded VertaMedia, a video advertising monetization platform. In 2012, he became the CEO of the company. In 2018, VertaMedia was rebranded to Adtelligent Inc. Adtelligent Inc. (VertaMedia) has been included in the list of the top 5000 American fastest-growing private companies according to the Inc. 5000 annual list by Inc. Magazine. The company was ranked No. 848 in 2016, No. 552 in 2017, and No.1319 in 2023. Adtelligent Inc. (VertaMedia) has been named among the fastest-growing companies in North America according to the Deloitte Technology Fast 500 four times. It was ranked No. 180 in 2016, No. 137 in 2017, No. 59 in 2022, and No. 301 in 2023. In 2016, VertaMedia won two Bronze Stevie Awards in the Annual American Business Awards and was named the Fastest Growing Tech Company of the Year as well as the Most Innovative Tech Company of the Year. In 2017, the company earned a Silver Stevie in the Most Innovative Tech Company of the Year – Up To 2,500 Employees category. The company was also recognized as one of America’s fastest-growing companies in 2023 by the Financial Times (No. 21).

Bornyakov also was a co-founder and board member of the advertising platform Clickky established in 2010.

In 2012, he co-founded one of the first in Ukraine business incubators—WannaBiz.

Bornyakov was included in the rating of 25 trailblazing business leaders in Ukraine in 2016.

== Public service ==
In 2010, Oleksandr became a deputy of the Odesa Regional Council in a multi-mandate constituency, a member of the Regional Council Secretariat, and a chairman of the Commission on Informatization and Communications.

In 2015, Bornyakov was elected the deputy of the Odesa City Council, and a chairman of the Commission on Economic, Investment Policy, Trade, International Relations and IT.

=== Ministry of Digital Transformation of Ukraine ===
In October 2019 he was appointed Deputy Minister of Digital Transformation of Ukraine on IT industry development.

Bornyakov is behind such projects as Diia.City, uResidency electronic residency program, AI development. Oleksandr is also responsible for strengthening and expanding the startup ecosystem.

In 2019 he was appointedsecretary of the supervisory board of the Ukrainian Startup Fund. Also, as a representative of the Ministry of Digital Transformation, he coordinates the activity of the state defense-tech cluster Brave1, launched in April 2023.

On January 14, 2026, the Cabinet of Ministers of Ukraine appointed an acting Minister of Digital Transformation of Ukraine.

=== IT development and Diia.City ===
Diia.City is a legal and tax environment for IT companies in Ukraine that offers its residents low tax rates, venture investment tools, an alternative hiring model, and IP protection guarantees. It was launched on February 8, 2022. As of the end of 2023, Diia.City has attracted over 760 resident companies.

In June 2022, Diia.City was recognized by the Emerging Europe Awards in the Modern and Future-Proof Policymaking category, featured "For its unique contribution to position Ukraine as a powerful IT hub by creating enabling conditions for companies to grow and attract foreign investment".

In August 2022, Diia.City project received a Red Dot Design Award in the Brand Experience and Logo Design nominations. Now the Diia.City project will be featured in the annual Red Dot Design Yearbook and the Red Dot Design Museum in Essen, the world's largest collection of contemporary design achievements.

Brave1

Brave1 is a state defense-tech cluster co-founded by the Ministry of Digital Transformation of Ukraine, the Ministry of Defense of Ukraine, the General Staff of the Armed Forces of Ukraine, the National Security and Defense Council of Ukraine, the Ministry of Strategic Industries of Ukraine, and the Ministry of Economy of Ukraine. It is the one-of-a-kind entry point for cooperation in Ukrainian defense tech: companies, government, defense forces, investors, volunteer funds, and media. Being the united coordinational platform created for efficient communication between all stakeholders of the sphere, the cluster provides organizational, informational, and financial support for defense tech projects in Ukraine.
