= Avenga =

Software and tech company

- Company type: Public
- Industry: Information technology; Software development
- Founded: 2019; 6 years ago
- Headquarters: Prague, Czech Republic
- Number of locations: 16 countries
- Area served: Worldwide
- Key people: Ludovic Gaudé (CEO); Mark Fisher (CCO); Tanja Duvander (CPO); Slawomir Kupczyk (COO); Ondřej Matuštík (CFO); Jakub Caloun (SVP Strategy and transformation); Dejan Petreski (SVP Information Technology and Cyber Security)
- Services: Technology consulting; Solution engineering; AI development; Cloudification; Managed services
- Owner: Cornerstone Partners; (2019-24); Oaktree Capital Management; (2019–24); KKCG; (2024–present)
- Number of employees: 6000+
- Website: avenga.com

Avenga (/ɑˈvengɑ/) is a consultancy and technology solutions company based in Prague, Czech Republic. The company provides outsourcing services, enterprise solutions, product development, and software development.

== History ==
Avenga was formed in 2019, however its formation resulted from a series of mergers and acquisitions beginning in 2017.

In 2017, private equity groups Oaktree Capital Management and Cornerstone Partners acquired Polish outsourcing firm IT Kontrakt. This initial merger was followed by further consolidations in 2018, when IT Kontrakt combined with another Polish technology company, Solidbrain.

Avenga took shape in 2019, when Ukrainian-American Corevalue and Germany's Sevenval joined the group. The four firms came together to create the company.

In 2021, Avenga acquired a Ukrainian software development firm, Perfectial. Through the acquisition of IncluIT in 2022, Avenga expanded its delivery capabilities to the Americas.

On February 28, 2024, KKCG completed the acquisition of Avenga.
