= Awesomic =

American artificial intelligence company

Awesomic, Inc.
- Type: Private
- Industry: Design, technology, freelancing
- Founded: 2020; 6 years ago
- Founders: Stacy Pavlyshyna; Roman Sevast
- Headquarters: San Francisco, California, US
- Key people: Roman Sevast (President); Stacy Pavlyshyna (CEO)
- Products: AI-powered talents on demand
- Website: awesomic.com

Awesomic, Inc. is an American AI startup that operates as a marketplace, its online platform allows businesses to find designers, engineers, marketing managers, and other remote professionals without interviews for a fixed price.

== History ==
Awesomic was founded in 2020 by Stacy Pavlyshyna and Roman Sevast. The first version of a web platform for finding web designers was launched in 2019 and in July 2020 it rebranded as Awesomic. The company initially focused on connecting businesses with designers and later expanded to include engineers, marketing managers, and other remote specialists.

In August 2020, the company raised a pre-seed round from European investors. The financial details of the deal have not been disclosed, but as Awesomic’s CEO, Roman Sevast, said, it was a six-figure amount.

In 2021, the startup was selected for the summer accelerator program at Y Combinator and received an investment of $125,000. Later that year, Awesomic raised a $2 million investment in a seed round, with participation from Y Combinator, Flyer One Ventures, SID Venture Partners, 10x Value Partners, and Pretiosum, alongside angel investors such as Ragnar Sass (Pipedrive), James Park (Fitbit), and John Graham (Humble Bundle). That year Awesomic was named the Fastest Growing Startup in Ukraine and its founders was listed in Forbes 30 under 30.

During the 2022 Russian invasion of Ukraine, Awesomic continued operations, maintaining service despite infrastructure disruptions by using generators and Starlink terminals. In August 2022, Awesomic became one of the 16 startups that received financial assistance as part of the $5 million Google for Startups Ukraine Support Fund initiative and received equity-free financing. Also in 2022, Awesomic was among the startups representing Ukraine at the Web Summit 2022 in Lisbon and won a Red Dot Award in the Brands and Communication Design category.

In March 2022, the company raised $800,000 in funding. The investment was provided by Pioneer Fund, Flyer One Ventures, Red Rooster Ventures, with Y Combinator managing director Michael Seibel, and Y Combinator group partner Jared Friedman. In 2024, the company opened an office in San Francisco.

On January 24, 2025, OpenAI launched an AI agent called Operator, designed to control computers and perform tasks. Awesomic had previously presented a similar concept, named GPT-a (for "assistant"), to OpenAI CEO Sam Altman in the fall of 2024.
