= Visa policy of Ukraine =

Policy on permits required to enter Ukraine

Visitors to Ukraine must obtain a visa from one of the Ukrainian diplomatic missions unless they are citizens of one of the visa-exempt countries or citizens who may obtain an e-Visa.

== Visa policy map ==
Visa policy of Ukraine Ukraine Visa not required (90 days) Visa not required with some condition (90 days) Visa not required (30 days) Visa not required (14 days) eVisa Visa required

== Visa exemption ==
=== Ordinary passports ===
Holders of ordinary passports of the following countries and territories may enter Ukraine without a visa for the following period:

90 days

- Brazil
- Israel
- Kyrgyzstan

90 days within any 180 days

- All European Union member states

- Albania
- Andorra
- Antigua and Barbuda
- Argentina
- Armenia
- Australia
- Azerbaijan
- Bahrain
- Belarus (Note: Citizens of Belarus (mostly men of military age and sometimes suspicious-looking women) could be denied entry for reasons of national security or without any explanation at all.)
- Canada
- Chile
- Colombia
- Dominica
- Ecuador
- Georgia^{ID*}
- Grenada
- Iceland
- Japan
- Kazakhstan
- Kuwait
- Liechtenstein
- Marshall Islands
- Mauritius
- Moldova
- Monaco
- Mongolia (Note: A visa is not required for business, private and tourist trips, provided that documents confirming the purpose of the trip (e.g. tourist voucher or invitation letter) are presented to the Ukrainian immigration officer.)
- Montenegro
- New Zealand
- North Macedonia
- Norway
- Oman
- Panama
- Peru
- Qatar
- Saint Kitts and Nevis
- Saint Vincent and the Grenadines
- San Marino
- Saudi Arabia
- Serbia
- South Korea
- Switzerland
- Tajikistan
- Turkey^{ID}
- United Arab Emirates
- United Kingdom (Note: Temporary visa-free regime for British Citizens only until 30 January 2027.)
- United States
- Uruguay
- Uzbekistan
- Vatican City

90 days within any 6 months

- Paraguay

30 days

- Brunei

30 days within any 60 days

- Bosnia and Herzegovina

14 days

- Hong Kong

_{ID - May enter with an ID card in lieu of a passport.}
_{ID* - May enter with an ID card if arriving directly from Georgia.}

Date of visa changes

Citizens of Armenia, Azerbaijan, Belarus, Georgia, Kazakhstan, Kyrgyzstan, Moldova, Tajikistan and Uzbekistan have never required a visa to enter Ukraine.

- 20 December 1979 (signed as USSR): Mongolia
- 1 July 2005: United States
- 1 August 2005: Canada and Japan
- 1 September 2005: Austria, Belgium, Cyprus, Czech Republic, Denmark, Estonia, Finland, France, Germany, Greece, Hungary, Ireland, Italy, Latvia, Liechtenstein, Lithuania, Luxembourg, Malta, Netherlands, Poland, Portugal, Slovakia, Slovenia, Spain, Sweden, Switzerland and United Kingdom
- 1 January 2006: Andorra, Iceland, Monaco, Norway, San Marino and Vatican City
- 24 June 2006: South Korea
- 1 January 2008: Bulgaria and Romania
- 28 May 2009: Paraguay
- 24 October 2010: Montenegro
- 3 November 2010: Hong Kong
- 9 February 2011: Israel
- 2 October 2011: Argentina
- 2 November 2011: Brunei
- 27 November 2011: Bosnia and Herzegovina
- 8 December 2011: Serbia
- 30 December 2011: Brazil
- 1 June 2012: Croatia
- 1 August 2012: Turkey
- 16 August 2013: Panama
- 21 October 2015: Chile
- 27 January 2017: Saint Kitts and Nevis
- 1 April 2017: Albania
- 31 December 2017: United Arab Emirates
- 29 June 2018: Antigua and Barbuda
- 2 November 2018: Qatar
- 15 February 2019: Uruguay
- 13 November 2019: Dominica
- 22 December 2019: North Macedonia
- 30 January 2020: United Kingdom (temporary visa exemption)
- 12 February 2020: Marshall Islands
- 2 April 2020: Ecuador
- 17 April 2020: Colombia
- 1 August 2020: Australia, Bahrain, China (temporary visa exemption), Kuwait, Macao (temporary visa exemption), New Zealand, Oman, Saudi Arabia and Taiwan (temporary visa exemption)
- 1 March 2021: Grenada
- 7 April 2021: Saint Vincent and the Grenadines
- 19 April 2025: Mauritius

Cancelled:

- Estonia, Latvia and Lithuania (was resumed in 2005)
- Vietnam: 6 December 1993
- Cuba: 23 May 1996
- Turkmenistan: 19 June 1999
- Czech Republic and Slovakia: 28 June 2000 (was resumed in 2005)
- Bulgaria: 1 October 2001 (was resumed in 2008)
- Hungary: 1 November 2001 (was resumed in 2005)
- Bosnia and Herzegovina: 13 March 2002 (was resumed in 2011)
- Poland: 1 October 2003 (was resumed in 2005)
- Romania: 16 July 2004 (was resumed in 2008)
- North Korea: 10 October 2016 (Note: The agreement was concluded between the USSR and North Korea in 1986. The terms of the agreement allowed visa-free entry for group and individual trips with a tourist document. Tourist documents define the national tourism organizations. After the collapse of the USSR, Ukraine and North Korea have not determined the form of the tourist document for visa-free travel. This visa-free regime has not been applied for citizens of Ukraine with ordinary passports from 1991. Ukraine denounced the agreement in 2016.)
- China, Macao and Taiwan: 31 January 2021 (was applied from 1 August 2020 as a temporary visa exemption)
- Russia: 1 July 2022

==== Electronic Travel Authorisation (ETA) ====
In August 2024, Ukraine announced the launch of its own Electronic Travel Authorization for visa-exempt countries.

=== Non-ordinary passports ===
In addition to countries whose citizens are visa-exempt, holders of diplomatic or official/service passports of Cambodia, Cuba, Dominican Republic, Egypt, Indonesia, Iran, Laos, Morocco, Peru, Singapore, Sri Lanka, Thailand, Tunisia, Turkmenistan, Venezuela, Vietnam and holders of diplomatic passports of India and Mexico may enter Ukraine without a visa.

=== Future changes ===
Ukraine has signed visa exemption agreements with the following countries, but they have not yet been ratified:

| Country | Passports | Agreement signed on |
|---|---|---|
| Mongolia | Ordinary | 8 November 2019 |
| Saudi Arabia | Diplomatic, special, service | 10 November 2026 |

== Electronic visa (e-Visa) ==
Ukraine introduced an e-Visa on 4 April 2018.

An e-Visa may be obtained by civil servants, foreign correspondents or media representatives for a business or working trip to Ukraine, which covers the spheres of culture, science, education and sports. In addition, an e-Visa may be obtained by citizens who want to visit the country for private, tourist or medical purposes.

The cost of an e-Visa is USD 20 for single-entry visa and USD 30 for double-entry visa with decision within 3 business days. Urgent visa processing is available for double visa fee (USD 40 / 60) and decision within 1 business day.

Ukraine resumed issuing e-Visas on 19 February 2025 after it was suspended in 2022 due to the Russian invasion of Ukraine.

Citizens of the following countries and territories may obtain an e-Visa for 30 days:

- ASEAN member states (except Brunei and Vietnam)

- Bahamas
- Barbados
- Belize
- Bhutan
- Bolivia
- China
- Costa Rica
- Dominican Republic
- El Salvador
- Fiji
- Guatemala
- Haiti
- Honduras
- India
- Jamaica
- Kiribati
- Macau
- Maldives
- Mexico
- Micronesia
- Nauru
- Nepal
- Nicaragua
- Palau
- Saint Lucia
- Samoa
- Seychelles
- Solomon Islands
- South Africa
- Suriname
- Taiwan
- Trinidad and Tobago
- Tuvalu
- Vanuatu

== Conflict area ==
Crimea, including Sevastopol, and parts of Dnipropetrovsk, Donetsk, Kharkiv, Kherson, Luhansk, Mykokaiv, Sumy and Zaporizhzhia regions are currently illegally occupied by Russia due to the Russo-Ukrainian War.

The Government of Ukraine strictly prohibits the entry and transit of foreign citizens to the occupied territories. Foreign citizens who entered the occupied territories without permission will be denied entry and transit to Ukraine. However, all this does not apply to citizens of Ukraine.

On 4 June 2015, the Government of Ukraine has adopted the resolution No. 367 "About the statement of the Order of entrance on temporarily occupied territory of Ukraine and departure from the territory". According to the document, entrance of foreigners and persons without citizenship on temporarily occupied territory of Ukraine and departure from the territory is carried out through checkpoints according to passport documents and the special permission given by territorial authority, which, however, is not issued to regular visitors.

== Fingerprinting ==
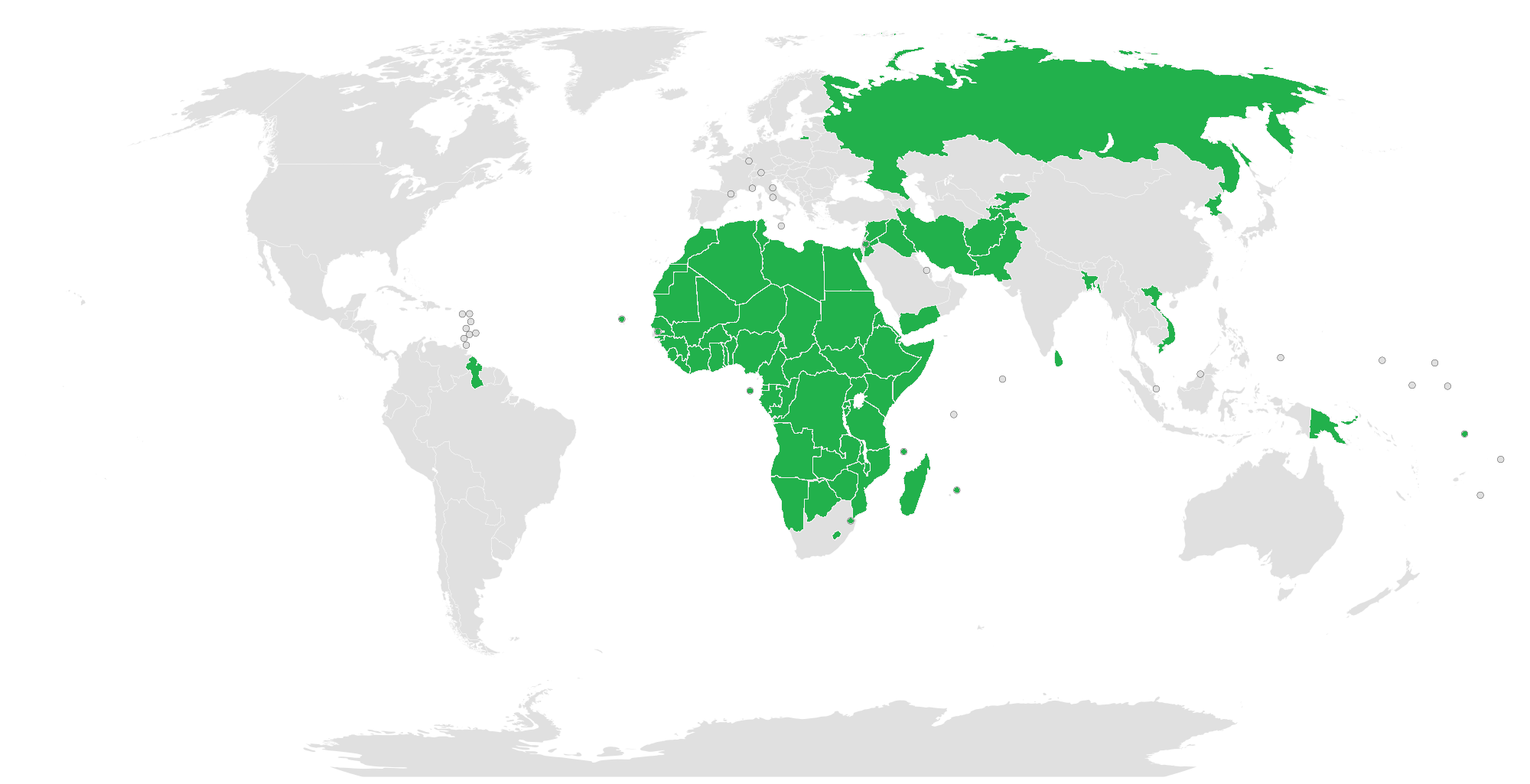
Countries required to go through biometric checks (in green)

Ukraine introduced a biometric control (fingerprints, digital photo) at border crossings for citizens of the following 70 countries and territories on 1 January 2018: Afghanistan, Algeria, Angola, Bangladesh, Benin, Botswana, Burkina Faso, Burundi, Cameroon, Cape Verde, Central African Republic, Chad, Comoros, Republic of Congo, Democratic Republic of Congo, Côte d'Ivoire, Djibouti, Egypt, Equatorial Guinea, Eritrea, Eswatini, Ethiopia, Gabon, Gambia, Ghana, Guinea, Guinea-Bissau, Guyana, Iran, Iraq, Jordan, Kenya, North Korea, Kyrgyzstan, Lebanon, Lesotho, Liberia, Libya, Madagascar, Malawi, Mali, Mauritania, Morocco, Mozambique, Namibia, Niger, Nigeria, Pakistan, Palestine, Papua New Guinea, Russia, Rwanda, São Tomé and Príncipe, Senegal, Sierra Leone, Somalia, South Sudan, Sri Lanka, Sudan, Syria, Tajikistan, Tanzania, Togo, Tonga, Tunisia, Uganda, Vietnam, Yemen, Zambia, Zimbabwe.

== Russia-related restrictions ==
On 1 July 2022, Ukraine introduced a unilateral visa regime with Russia. Russia did not introduce a visa regime with Ukraine.

Since the diplomatic missions of Ukraine (embassies, general and honorary consulates, ordinary consulates) in Russian cities were closed after Ukraine severed all official diplomatic ties with Russia (following the Russian invasion of Ukraine), Russian citizens residing in Russia must apply to commercial visa centers, which will only operate in a few Russian cities. Those Russian citizens who are outside of Russia should apply for a visa at one of the diplomatic missions of Ukraine in other countries of the world.

The Ukrainian and Russian services of Radio Liberty found out that even obtaining a Ukrainian visa by a Russian citizen does not guarantee and does not mean their admission to the territory of Ukraine. Ukrainian border guards are ordered to leave admission or refusal of entry at their discretion (if a person seems suspicious to them or if they cannot answer the border guard's questions reliably), even to holders of a valid Ukrainian visa.

== Admission restrictions ==
Ukraine does not recognize the passports of Abkhazia, Northern Cyprus, the Sahrawi Republic, Somaliland, South Ossetia and Transnistria.

== Visitor statistics ==
Most visitors arriving in Ukraine were from the following countries of nationality:

| Country | 2017 | 2016 | 2015 | 2014 | 2013 |
|---|---|---|---|---|---|
| Moldova | ▲4,435,664 | ▼4,296,409 | ▲4,393,528 | ▼4,368,355 | 5,417,966 |
| Belarus | ▲2,727,645 | ▼1,822,261 | ▲1,891,518 | ▼1,592,935 | 3,353,652 |
| Russia | ▼1,464,764 | ▲1,473,633 | ▼1,231,035 | ▼2,362,982 | 10,284,782 |
| Poland | ▲1,144,249 | ▲1,195,163 | ▲1,156,011 | ▼1,123,945 | 1,259,209 |
| Hungary | ▼1,058,970 | ▲1,269,653 | ▲1,070,035 | ▲874,184 | 771,038 |
| Romania | ▲791,116 | ▲774,585 | ▲763,228 | ▼584,774 | 877,234 |
| Slovakia | ▼366,249 | ▼410,508 | ▼412,519 | ▼416,158 | 424,306 |
| Turkey | ▲270,695 | ▲199,618 | ▲140,691 | ▼116,302 | 151,706 |
| Israel | ▲261,486 | ▲216,638 | ▲149,386 | ▼101,799 | 120,913 |
| Germany | ▲209,447 | ▲171,118 | ▲154,498 | ▼131,244 | 253,318 |
| Other countries | ▼1,499,357 | ▲1,503,510 | ▲1,065,837 | ▼1,038,829 | 1,757,103 |
| Total | ▲14,229,642 | ▲13,333,096 | ▼12,428,286 | ▼12,711,507 | 24,671,227 |

== See also ==
- Visa requirements for Ukrainian citizens
- Foreign policy of Ukraine
- Ministry of Foreign Affairs (Ukraine)
- State Border Guard Service of Ukraine
