= Ukrainian identity card =

National identity card of Ukraine

Passport of a citizen of Ukraine (Паспорт громадянина України)
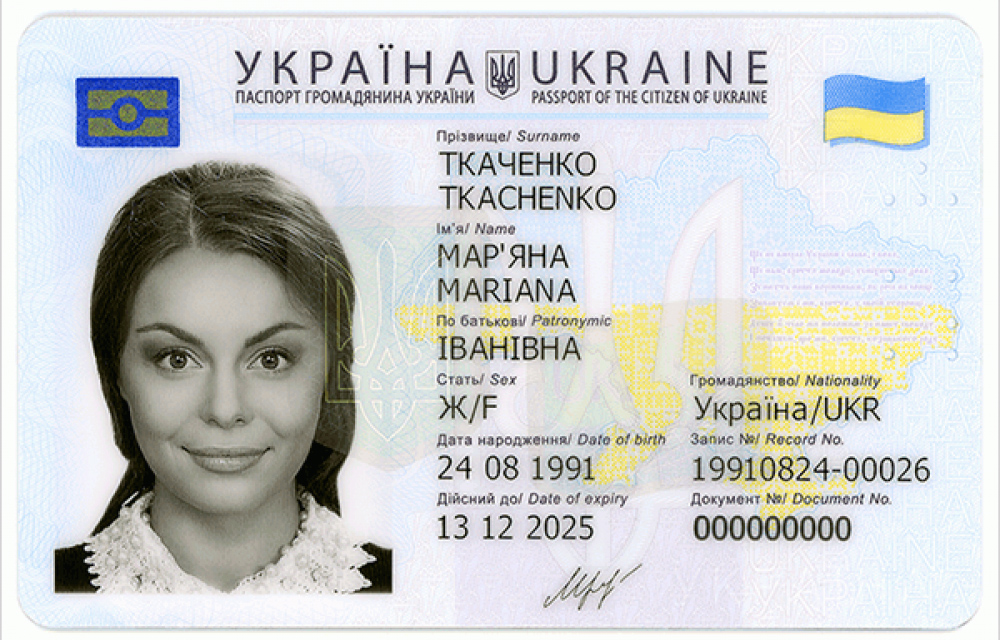
- Specimen of the 2016 series card
- Type: Identity card
- Issued by: Ukraine
- First issued: 2016
- Purpose: Proof of identity
- Valid in: Ukraine; Georgia (if arriving directly from Ukraine): Moldova (only one entry/exit from/to Ukraine); Russia; Turkey
- Eligibility: Ukrainian citizen
- Expiration: 4 or 10 years
- Cost: ₴345

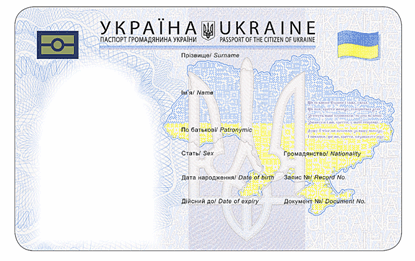
Ukrainian identity card, front side

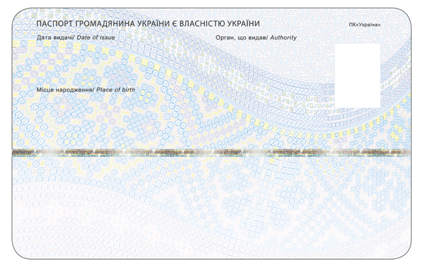
Ukrainian identity card, back side

The Ukrainian identity card (sometimes called "internal passport") takes the form of a credit card sized plastic card with an integrated contactless microchip on which personal data is held. The top of the card bears the coat of arms of Ukraine, the name of the country, and the words "Passport of the Citizen of Ukraine" [sic] in both Ukrainian and English. The flag of Ukraine appears in the top right corner of the card, whilst the international symbol for biometric documents can be found in the top left corner.

The front of the card bears a black and white laser embossed image of the holder, their signature and the following key personal details in both Ukrainian and English (Latin script):

- Surname
- First name(s)
- Patronymic (in Ukrainian only)
- Sex
- Date of birth
- Nationality (УКРАЇНА/UKR)
- Record No.
- Document No.
- Expiry date

The reverse of the card bears the following pieces of information:

- Date of issue
- Authority
- Taxpayer No
- Place of birth

== Security features ==
Other than the integrated contactless microchip which holds a wider range of personal data than the information visible on the front or reverse of the card, the Ukrainian identity card makes use of a range of modern security techniques, including micro-printing, holographic elements, colour-changing ink, raised printing, laser embossing, and UV elements, visible only under ultraviolet light.

A number of personalised security elements are also used, such as a hologram on the card's reverse which alternately displays an image of the holder and their date of birth. Other personalised security elements include a metallic tape running along the reverse of the card into which the holder's name is laser engraved, and a machine readable zone.

== History of identity cards in Ukraine ==
Ukraine first planned to introduce ID cards in 2004 during the presidency of Leonid Kuchma, with the start of production planned to coincide with the launch of a new Unified State Demographic Register. These cards were designed to contain a contactless chip – a design element which led to unease in certain sections of society. The planned introduction of both elements of this plan was cancelled by the newly elected President Viktor Yuschenko on 10 March 2005.

Later in 2005, the Ministry of Internal Affairs of Ukraine initiated a programme to introduce plastic ID cards which would have held tax and pension data on an integrated electronic chip. This plan was later dropped after being criticised by ordinary citizens and the Ukrainian Helsinki Group for having a lax approach to the security of personal data. Similar plans were resurrected again in 2008, but were postponed to the future.

On 23 September 2011, The Ukrainian Parliament voted to replace domestic passports with ID cards (Ukrainian: Паспортна картка). The law provided for the new form of ID to be issued from 1 January 2012. However, the bill was vetoed by Ukrainian president Viktor Yanukovych on grounds of supposed failings in providing adequate personal data safeguards.

After numerous delays, the bill for the creation of the Unified State Demographic Register was passed and signed into law on 29 November 2012. This paved the way for the introduction of biometric passports for foreign travel and the replacement of internal passports with ID cards.

On 10 July 2015, the Ukrainian government announced that internal passports would be abolished and replaced with ID cards, starting from 1 January 2016. The first ID cards were issued to first-time applicants on 11 January 2016.

== Previous internal passport (1994–2015) ==
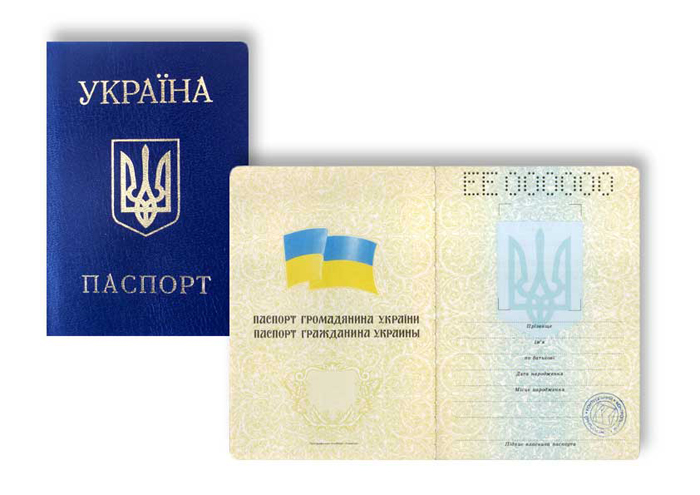
A 1994 series passport

From 1994 until 2015 Ukrainian internal passports were only produced and issued in the form of a traditional passport booklet. Regardless of the move to the new ID card format from 2016, all 1994 series passports currently remain valid.

1994 series passports had a dark blue cover and contained 16 pages. All information in the passport is recorded in the Ukrainian language, except for the holder's name, date and place of birth, and issuing authority, which are given both in Ukrainian and Russian, or stamps about person's residence in the Autonomous Republic of Crimea or Sevastopol, which could be written only in Russian.

The information contained within the passport included the holder's:

- Passport number (2 Latin letters and 6 digits)
- Surname
- Forename(s)
- Patronymic name
- Date and place of birth
- A photograph and signature of the holder
- Name of the person's spouse (if married)
- Names of any dependent children (younger than 16 years)
- Eligibility for military service
- Registered address

The 1994 series passports do not have an expiration date; they remain valid throughout the holder's life. Despite this, additional photographs need to be affixed on reaching the ages of 25 and 45. It is also expected that any changes in marital status, eligibility for military service, and registered place of residence are subsequently recorded in the passport. Since 2016, changes in marital status are no longer recorded on passports or on the biometric chips of ID cards.

A new passport can be obtained if there is a change in the holder's name, most commonly due to marriage. New passports are also issued in cases where the original passport has been subjected to significant wear and tear, or has been lost or stolen.

== International travel ==
In 2017, Turkey granted Ukrainian citizens the right to enter visa-free for up to 90 days with an ID card. Furthermore, since March 2019, Georgia accepts a Ukrainian ID card if the traveller arrives directly from Ukraine (as the two countries do not share a land border, this would imply arrival via air or sea). Regarding trips to Russia, a Ukrainian national can enter the country with their Passport of the Citizen of Ukraine on the basis of the 1997 agreement (at that time only for "internal passport booklets", as Ukrainian ID cards didn't exist). This has been confirmed in 2023 and no notes have been made as to this possibility with an ID card, which officially bears the same name as the previously used 1994 series passports. Moreover, first-hand accounts suggest that Russian border control accepts citizens of Ukraine travelling with the new document. Ukraine, however, stopped accepting both ID cards and "internal passport booklets" at its exit checkpoints with Russia on 1 March 2020 and the border between the countries is currently closed due to the Russian invasion of Ukraine. As of 24 February 2022, men between the ages of 18 and 60 are not allowed to leave the country, unless they are exempt from conscription.
