= Internal passport of Russia =

Identity document of Russia

Internal Russian passport
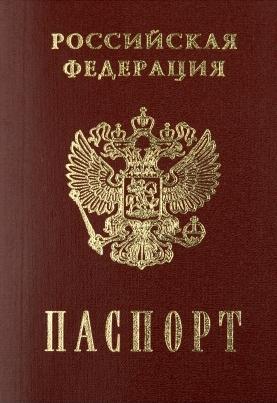
- Cover of the Internal Russian passport
- Type: Internal passport
- Issued by: Ministry of Internal Affairs
- First issued: 1997
- Purpose: Identification, proof of residence, proof of citizenship
- Valid in: Russia Eurasian Economic Union: Armenia (only by air); Belarus; Kazakhstan; Kyrgyzstan; Abkhazia South Ossetia
- Eligibility: Russian citizenship; At least 14 years old
- Expiration: Renewed at age 20 and 45
- Cost: 300 ₽, 1500 ₽ in case of loss or damage

The Internal Russian passport (Note: Russian: Паспорт гражданина Российской Федерации, romanized: Pasport grazhdanina Rossiyskoy Federatsii, lit. 'Passport of a Citizen of the Russian Federation', commonly shortened to passport (Russian: паспорт, romanized: Pasport)) is a mandatory identity document for all Russian citizens residing in Russia who are aged 14 or over. The Internal Russian passport is an internal passport used for travel and identification purposes in Russia, which is distinct from the international Russian passport used by Russian citizens to travel in and out of Russian borders. (Note: The Internal Russian passport can also be used to travel to the former Soviet states of Armenia (by air only), Belarus, Kazakhstan and Kyrgyzstan, as well as the partially recognised states of Abkhazia and South Ossetia.)

After the dissolution of the Soviet Union in 1991, the Soviet Union internal passport continued to be issued until 1997, when a new regulating decree was adopted by the government and when it was replaced by the Russian internal passport. The current Russian internal passports were first issued in 2007.

The Russian government is planning to replace the Internal Passport with a biometric, credit card size card. The universal electronic card issued between 2013 and 2016 was planned to replace the Russian Internal passport as the sole national identity document for Russian citizens but was scrapped in early 2017.

== History ==
=== Background ===
After the 1861 liberation of the serfs in the Russian Empire, the peasant was legally declared to be attached to the former tax-paying estate or having a rural station (sel'skoe sostoianie). Membership in the peasant community, the legally mandatory reception of allotment land, arrears, and collective responsibility characterized this rural station, and the passport system and residence permit enforced it. The internal passport was issued only in the local district office and was valid for the entire empire, while the identification card (Russian: Свидетельство) was valid only within 30 verst (approximately thirty kilometers) of the place of registration – thus internal passports were critical for obtaining work outside a farmer's own district.

=== Modern era ===
In 1992, passports or other photo identification documents became necessary to board trains. Train tickets started to bear passenger names, allegedly as an effort to combat speculative reselling of the tickets.

On 9 December 1992, special pages were introduced which were affixed in Soviet passports, certifying that the bearer of the passport was a citizen of Russia. These pages were optional unless travelling to the other former Soviet republics which continued to accept Soviet passports; for other occasions, other proofs of citizenship were accepted as well. Issuance of the pages continued until the end of 2002.

On 8 July 1997, the currently-used design of the Russian internal passport was introduced. Unlike the Soviet passports, which had three photo pages, the new passports only have one. A passport is first issued at the age of 14, and then replaced upon reaching the ages of 20 and 45. The text in the passports is in Russian, but passports issued in autonomous entities may, on the bearer's request, contain an additional page duplicating all data in one of the official local languages.

A deadline for exchanging old passports for the new ones was initially set for the end of 2001 but was then extended several times and finally set for 30 June 2004. The government had first regulated that having failed to exchange one's passport would constitute a punishable violation. However, the Supreme Court ruled to the effect that citizens cannot be obliged to exchange their passports. The Soviet passports ceased to be valid as means of personal identification since mid-2004, but it is still legal (though barely practical) to have one.

The propiska was formally abandoned soon after adoption of the current Constitution in 1993 and replaced with a "residency registration" which, in principle, was simply record of one's place of residence.

Nevertheless, under the new regulations, permanent registration records are stamped in citizens' internal passports just as were propiskas. This has led to the widespread misconception that registration was just a new name for the propiska; in fact, many still continue to call it "propiska". This misconception is partly reinforced by the fact that the existing regulations for registration make it an onerous process, being dependent on the will and consent of landlords and which effectively prevents tenants from registering themselves.

Internal Russian passports are issued only inside the country. Russian citizens who live abroad can get an internal passport only if they visit Russia, i.e., it is not possible to get an internal passport at a Russian consulate abroad. In practice, Russian citizens who live abroad often do not get new internal passports at all, as the law allows them to prove their identity with an international Russian passport.

== Description ==
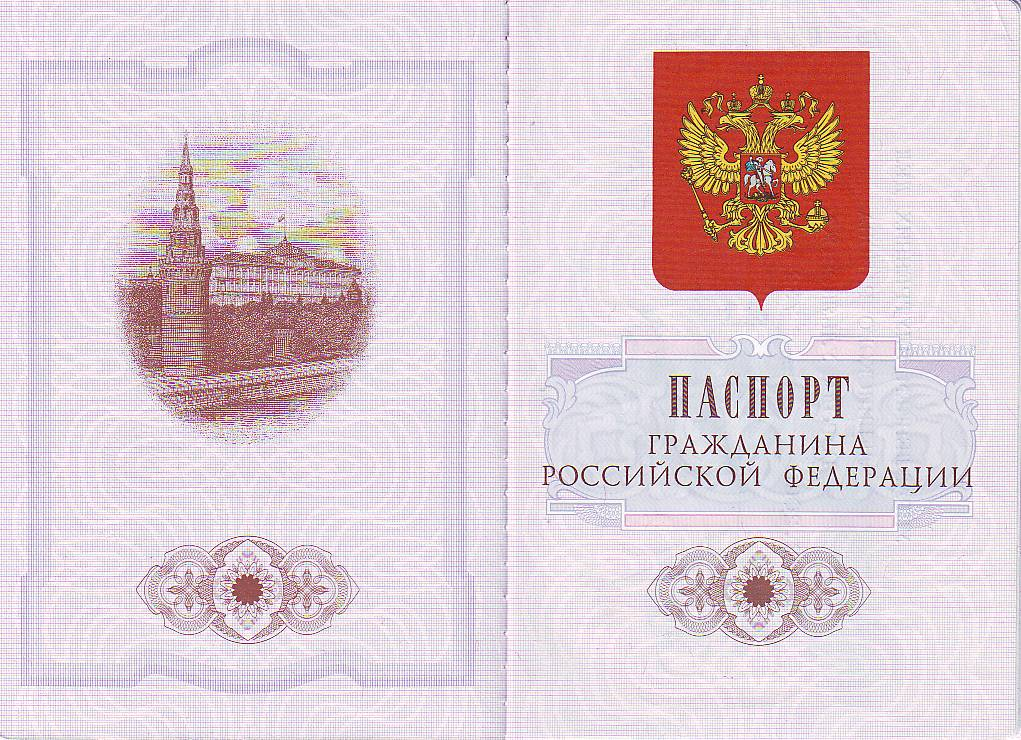
The first page of the passport

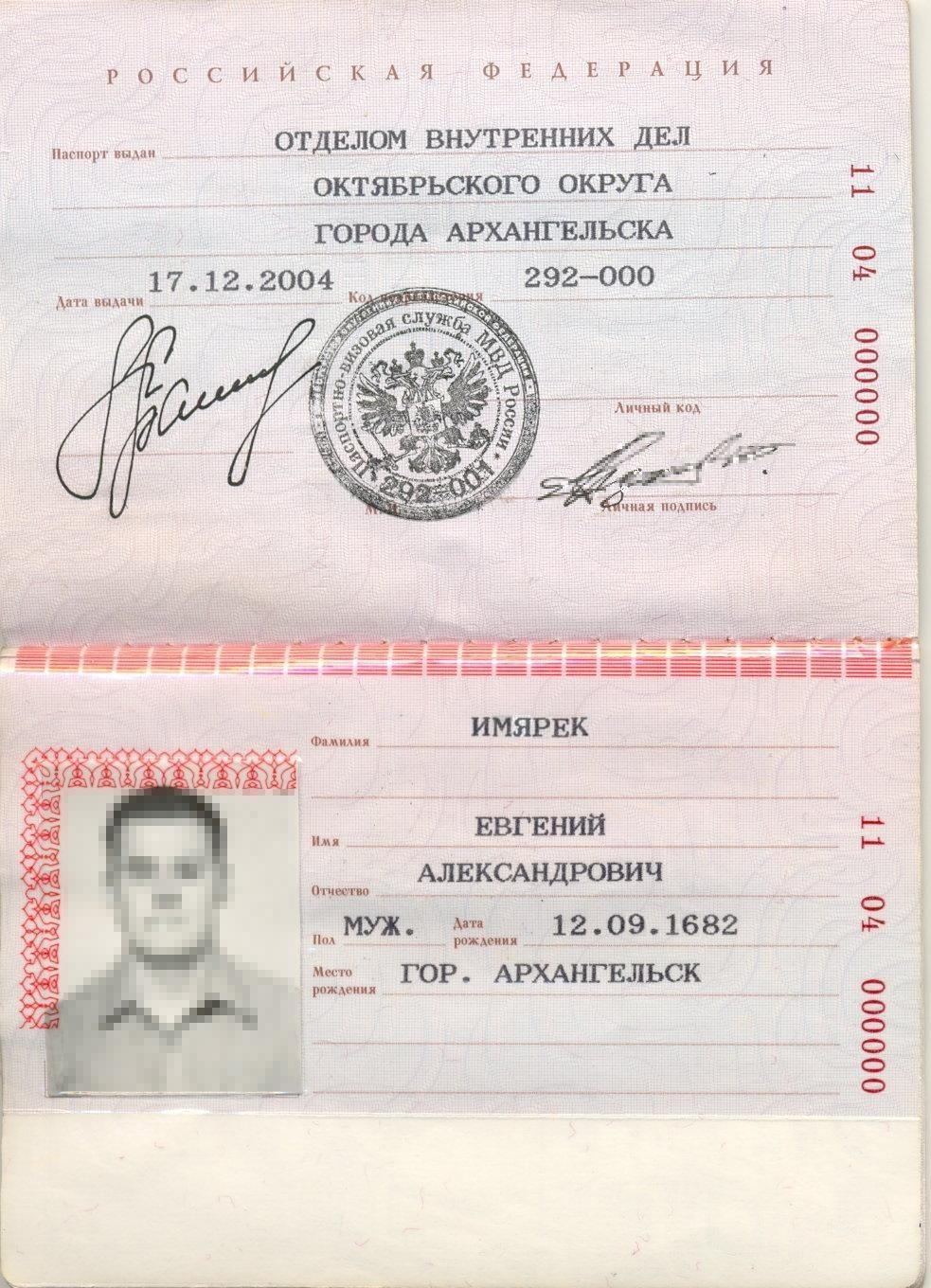
The bio data page / second page of the passport

Each passport has a data page and a signature page. A data page has a visual zone which contains a photograph of the passport holder, data about the passport, and data about the holder:

- Surname
- Given name and patronymic
- Sex
- Date of birth
- Place of birth

Passports carry series and passport number and are written in the format XX XX YYYYYY.

Special records shall be made in the passport:

- on the registration of a citizen within a community/at a specific address and on removal from the registration records;
- on the military conscription of citizens who have by the time is 18 years old;
- on the registration and termination of a marriage;
- for children under 14 years of age;
- for any previously issued basic identity documents of a citizen of the Russian Federation on the territory of the Russian Federation;
- for the extradition of the main documents of identity of the citizen of the Russian Federation outside the Russian Federation – only about valid ones at the time mention is made.

On pages 2 and 3 of the passport, the series and number of the passport are printed in the passport in a typographical way. Until 2008, the series and number were also inked on subsequent pages. Since 2008, on pages 5 to 20, as well as on the back cover, the series and number have been laser-perforated.

At the citizen's request, the passport may also include:

- the holder's blood type and the Rh factor (added by the medical facility where the citizen's blood type and Rh were tested, for example after a blood transfusion or donation);
- the holder's tax identification number.

=== Pages ===
- Page 1 – In the upper part, a color image of the State Emblem of the Russian Federation is reproduced. In the middle (under the coat of arms), the words "passport of a citizen of the Russian Federation" are printed in three lines in ornamental design. Under the words is a typographic drawing "rosette".
- Page 2 – In the upper part, the words "Passport issued", "Date of issue", "Subdivision code", "Personal code" (not used), "Personal signature" are printed. In the lower left corner of the page, a subline is printed for the signature of the head of the department that issued the passport, and a place is reserved for affixing the seal, marked with the letters "M. P.". The text of details and lines for making entries on pages 2 and 3 are parallel to the fold of the form. Lines for making entries are applied with an interval of 6.6 mm.
- Page 3 – Designed to place on it the personal data of a citizen of the Russian Federation. The page consists of two parts: the upper three-quarters of the page is a visual zone, in which a photo of the passport holder sized 35 × 45 mm is placed on the left, and the following passport details are on the right: "Last name", "First name", "Patronymic name", "Gender", date of birth, place of birth. The place for the sticker of the photo is indicated by the corners. The bottom quarter of the page, opposite the fold, is a zone for making machine readable entries (not used in passports issued before June 30, 2011, inclusive, this zone is filled in from July 1, 2011). In order to protect personal information, the third page is laminated with a film with a holographic image at high temperature. It contains images of a sixteen-pointed star with the letters "RF" inscribed in it and the coat of arms of the Russian Federation with the word "RUSSIA" written on it in the form of an arc, located through one horizontally and vertically; between the lines in each column are the words "RUSSIA" and "РОССИЯ" (the Russian name of the country), alternating in the order of the columns. In the upper right corner of the third page there is an element in the form of a circle with the letters "РФ". Depending on the angle of view, the element changes its color from magenta to green.
- Page 4 – Entries and marks are not made.
- Pages 5 to 12 – Designed for putting marks on the registration of a citizen and removing him from the registration at the place of residence. At the top of the fifth page with the orientation in the center is placed the props "Residence". Until December 31, 2004, in order to ensure visa-free travel to the Kaliningrad region without a foreign passport, photographs of children under the age of 14 were also pasted on the twelfth page – citizens of the Russian Federation.
- Page 13 – Designed to mark the attitude of a citizen to military duty. At the top of the thirteenth page with orientation in the center is placed the props "Military duty".
- Pages 14–15 – Designed for the production of marks on registration and divorce. At the top of the fourteenth page with an orientation in the center is the props "Marital Status". This is not mandatory from 2021.
- Pages 16–17 – Designed to enter information about the children of the passport holder. At the top of the seventeenth page of the passport blank (parallel to the fold) with an orientation in the center is the props "Children". On the seventeenth page, continuing to the sixteenth, there is a table consisting of eighteen lines and four columns (from left to right): "Gender", "Last name, first name, patronymic", "Date of birth", "Personal code" (not used). In the "Personal code" column, a round red stamp of the Federal Migration Service of Russia is sometimes placed to confirm the citizenship of the Russian Federation in children. Lines for making entries on pages 16 and 17 are parallel to the fold of the form, applied at intervals of 6.6 mm. Stamps for children are not mandatory since 2021.
- Page 18 – intended for making notes about the blood type, Rh factor and TIN of the passport holder, as well as for obtaining the main document proving the identity of a citizen of the Russian Federation outside the Russian Federation.
- Page 19 – intended for making notes on the receipt of the main identity document of a citizen of the Russian Federation outside the Russian Federation, as well as on previously issued basic documents proving the identity of a citizen of the Russian Federation on the territory of the Russian Federation. Information about issued foreign passports is also indicated here.
- Page 20 – contains the grounds for information from the Regulation that is relevant for the passport holder: information about the duty of careful storage, reminders to replace the document on time, as well as the possibility to enter only the data provided for by this Regulation. This page has special marks: In the upper part there is a typographic drawing - an ornamental border strip with an orientation in the center (on the strip you can see the word "Russia" made in horizontal embossing), under the drawing the heading "Extract from the Regulations on the Passport of a Citizen of the Russian Federation" is printed.

== Issuance, replacement and usage of passports ==
=== Authorities responsible for the issuance and replacement of passports ===
Passports are issued and replaced by territorial offices of the federal executive agency authorized to exercise powers in the area of migration – the place of residence of citizens, by place of stay or the place of application. If there are agreements concluded with the territorial authorities of the Federal Migration Service, the documents for replacement/issuance of the passport of a citizen of the Russian Federation can be accepted by the Multifunctional Centres.

Previously, the issuance and replacement of passports was the responsibility of the Passport and Visa Service of the Ministry of Internal Affairs of Russia. Following Presidential Decree No. 928 of July 19, 2004, the Passport and Visa Service was dissolved and the functions of control over migration and the issuing of passports were transferred to the Federal Migration Service. The final transfer took place on 1 January 2006, after the establishment of the territorial authorities of the Federal Migration Service of Russia.

On 5 April 2016, by presidential decree, the Federal Migration Service was abolished and its functions and powers were transferred to the Main Directorate for Migration Affairs of the Ministry of Internal Affairs of the Russian Federation. Thus, currently, the issuance and replacement of passports are carried out by the territorial bodies of the Main Directorate for Migration Affairs at the place of residence, stay or application of citizens.

=== Replacement ===
Renewal of the passport is regulated by Decree No. 828 of 1997–2018 issued by the government which was signed by V. Chernomyrdin. According to the decree, passports are due to be issued and replaced when the owner reaches a certain age: at 14, 20, and 45 years old.

Upon reaching the age of 20 or 45, the passport must be replaced within 90 days after the person's birthday. While undergoing military conscription, the passport can be issued or replaced at their place of residence at the end of the set period of military service. If a citizen is imprisoned, administration of a penal entity should return passport or render obtainment of a new one upon completion of punishment.

=== Rules for the use of a passport ===
A citizen is obliged to keep his passport with care. A citizen must immediately report the loss of a passport to a territorial body of the Ministry of Internal Affairs.

It is forbidden to confiscate a citizen's passport, except in cases provided for by the legislation of the Russian Federation.

Until a new passport is issued, a temporary identity document, the form of which is established by the Ministry of Internal Affairs of the Russian Federation, is provided at the citizen's request by a structural subdivision of the authority competent in the area of migration.

Persons whose citizenship of the Russian Federation has been terminated must surrender their passports to the internal affairs bodies at their place of residence or place of stay, or to the territorial bodies of the Ministry of Internal Affairs. Persons residing outside the Russian Federation must surrender them to a diplomatic mission or consular office of the Russian Federation in the state of residence, which forwards them to the territorial authorities of the Ministry of Internal Affairs of Russia at the last place of residence or stay of these persons in the territory of the Russian Federation.

A found passport is to be handed over to the authorities of the Ministry of Internal Affairs.

The passport of a person remanded in custody or sentenced to imprisonment is temporarily confiscated by the pretrial investigation agency or the court and added to the personal file of the person in question. On release from custody or when serving a sentence of deprivation of liberty, the passport is returned to the citizen.

The passport of a deceased citizen is handed over to the civil registry authorities at the place of registration of the death, which send it to the territorial office of the Ministry of Internal Affairs of Russia at the last place of residence or place of stay of the deceased citizen on the territory of the Russian Federation. The passport of a citizen who died outside the Russian Federation is taken to a diplomatic mission or consular office of the Russian Federation for its subsequent forwarding to the relevant territorial body of the Ministry of Internal Affairs of Russia.

== Replacement with identity cards ==
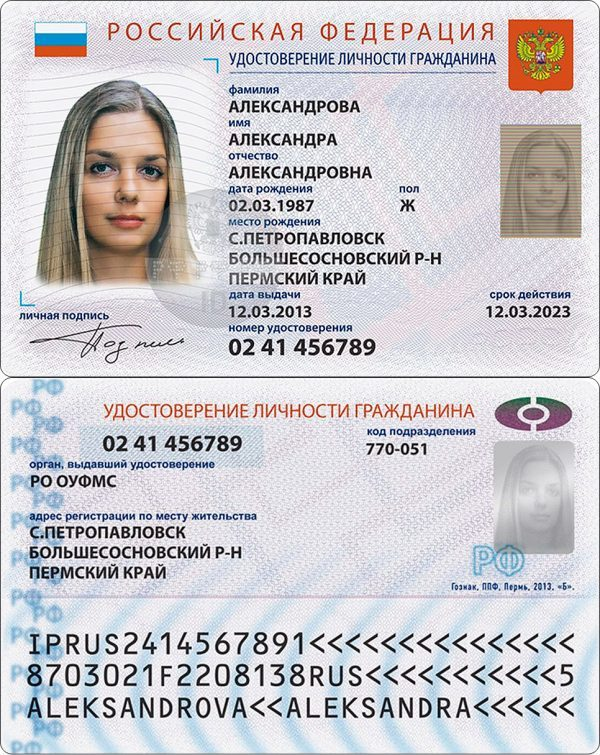
Planned electronic identity card for Russian citizens

In November 2010, the Ministry of Internal Affairs announced the cancellation of internal passports, with the aim of replacing them with plastic identity cards or driver's licenses by 2025. Country-wide replacement was postponed until 15 March 2018 so as not to interfere with 2016 Duma election, and was then further postponed until 2022.

== See also ==
- Identity card of the Russian Armed Forces
- Visa requirements for Russian citizens
- Russian passport
- Passport system in the Soviet Union
- Migration card
- Propiska in the Soviet Union
- Resident registration in Russia
- Wolf ticket (Russia)
- 101st kilometre
- Closed city
- Internal passport
- Real ID Act United States
- Irish passport card
