= Internal passport =

Document issued to control domestic travel and internal migration

An internal or domestic passport is a type of identity document issued in a passport-like booklet format. Internal passports may have a variety of uses including:

1. An ordinary identity document produced in a passport format (such as the modern Russian internal passport)
2. Recording the residence and place of employment of citizens for civil registration purposes (such as the Chinese hukou)
3. Management and restriction of internal migration (as in the Soviet Union)
4. Recording demographic information such as ethnicity and citizenship and immigration status, sometimes related to structural discrimination (such as the pass books in Apartheid South Africa)
5. Controlling access to closed cities and other sensitive locations

When passports first emerged, there was no clear distinction between internal and international ones. Later, some countries developed sophisticated systems of passports for various purposes and various groups of population.

== Summary ==
=== Countries that currently have internal passports in the strict sense (to control internal migration) include ===
- China (hukou - Resident Identity Card)
- Vietnam (hộ khẩu - Vietnamese identity card)
- North Korea (hoju - North Korean identity card)

=== The following countries issue internal passports as main identity documents for travel and identification purposes (analogous to identity cards in other countries) ===
- Russian Federation (Russian internal passport)
- Turkmenistan (Turkmen internal passport, "raýatlyk pasporty")

=== Internal passports are known to have been issued and used previously by ===
- Russian Empire and its successor states
- France, until 1862
- Canada (for certain indigenous groups from 1885 to 1941)
- Confederate States of America
- United States (for African-Americans in slave states prior to the Civil War)
- Soviet Union (see Soviet Union internal passport)
- Ottoman Empire
- Italy (passaporto per l'interno) https://archiviodistatogorizia.cultura.gov.it/gennaio-2023-un-passaporto-per-il-regno/
- Lithuania, between 1919 and 1940, not intended for traveling; but rather acting as personal identification documents entitling the user to Lithuanian citizenship.
- South Africa, during apartheid
- Ukraine (1994-2015)
- Iraq (until 2016, replaced by National Card)
- Nazi Germany (from 1938 until 1943)
- Sweden (until 1860)
- People's Republic of Bulgaria and Bulgaria (until 1999)

== Terminology ==
In many countries, the word "passport" is only used in modern language to denote a document issued for the purpose of international travel, which is subject to discretionary permission. However, in some post-Soviet countries, the word "passport" is implied to merely mean a primary identification document, especially if it has the form of a booklet, and often carries the connotation of citizenship - “I have a Russian passport” is a widely understood synecdoche to mean that one is a citizen of Russia. Nevertheless, it is also extended by analogy to other forms of identification documents. For example, Ukrainian identity cards that are replacing old-fashioned internal passport booklets are still legally called паспорт (pasport, "passport").

== Types ==
=== Canada ===
In 1885 the "pass system" was introduced in Canada, to restrict and control the movement of First Nations people within Canada. Instituted at the time of the North-West Rebellion, it remained in force for 60 years despite having no basis in law. Any First Nation person caught outside his Indian reserve without a pass issued by an Indian agent was returned to the reserve or incarcerated.

=== France ===
In France, in the past, one had to show an internal passport to change city. Former convicts who had served forced labour, even after having served their sentence, had a yellow passport, which made them outcasts. A famous fictional holder of the yellow passport is the former bagnard Jean Valjean the hero of the novel Les Misérables by Victor Hugo.

A décret issued 2 October 1795 (10 Vendémiaire year IV in the French Republican Calendar) required all persons traveling outside the limits of their canton to possess either an internal passport (for voyages within France) or external passport (for travel outside France). In 1815 an internal passport cost 2 francs and was delivered by the mayor of the commune to the residence of the passport requester. Internal passports were significantly easier to obtain than passports for foreign travel, which cost 10 francs in 1815. In the early 19th century, many emigrants obtained cheaper and easier-to-obtain internal passports to travel to the port of Le Havre, from which most ships to the United States departed. As control of the issuance of internal passports, which required a certificate of good behavior, was in the hands of the mayors of communes, there was some degree of favoritism in the issuance/denial of internal passports in the 18th century.

Internal passports were finally abolished in France in 1862.

==== Booklet and notebook of circulation of travellers ====
In France, the "livret de circulation" (booklet of circulation) and its variant the "carnet de circulation" (notebook of circulation) provided to those of no fixed abode were particularly constraining and discriminatory obligations imposed on itinerants.

At the end of 2012, when examining a priority question of constitutionality, the Constitutional Council ended the notebook of circulation, considering that it harmed disproportionately the freedom of movement.

=== South Africa ===
In South Africa, the pass laws (notably the Pass Laws Act 1952, which applied until 1986) were a component of the apartheid system. The laws regulated where, when and for how long persons could remain outside their "homeland"—which, for many people, was not their homeland, so thousands of indigenous people were forced to change region. These laws also made it compulsory for all black South Africans over the age of 15 to carry a pass book at all times. However, the legislation also required that citizens of all races have on their person an ID book, which closely approximates a passport.

=== Soviet Union and its successors ===
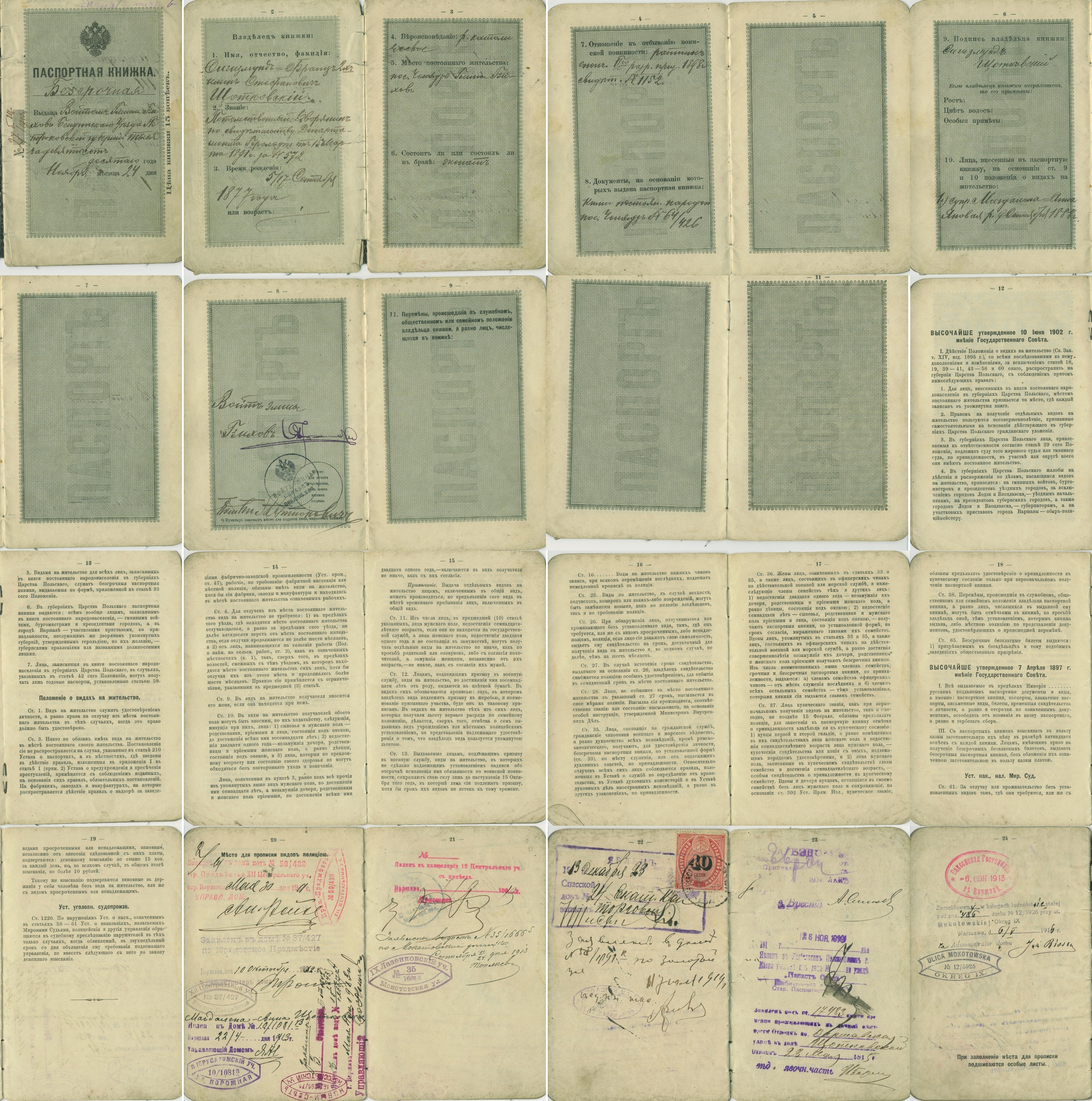
Pages of internal passport, issued in 1910 in Imperial Russia

The internal passport system of the Russian Empire was abandoned after the October Revolution in 1917, lifting most limitations upon internal movements of members of labouring classes in Soviet Russia. Labour booklets became the principal means of personal identification.

In 1932, the "passport regime" was reintroduced, its declared purpose to improve the registration of population and "relieve" major industrial cities and other sensitive localities of "hiding kulaks and dangerous political elements" and those "not engaged in labor of social usefulness". The "passportization" process developed gradually involving factories, large, medium, and small cities, settlements, and rural areas, and finally became universal by the mid-1970s.

Internal passports were used in the Soviet Union for identification of persons for various purposes. In particular, passports were used to control and monitor the place of residence by means of the propiska, a regulation designed to control the population's internal movement by binding a person to his or her permanent place of residence. For example, a valid propiska was necessary to receive higher education or medical treatment, although these services were not limited to the location registered. Besides marriage to a resident of another area, university education was the most popular way of circumventing one's propiska and residing elsewhere. Also, since only a minority of dwellings were privately owned, having a propiska at a certain address meant that one had the right to live there.

All residents were required by law to record their address in the document and to report any relevant changes to a local office of the Ministry of Internal Affairs. For example, citizens needed to submit photographs of themselves for their passport, taken when they were issued the document at age 16, and again at ages 25 and 45.

Formally, passports were not necessary for traveling per se in late Soviet Union. Bus, train, and air tickets were sold without names, and identification documents were not necessary for boarding buses and trains (and only became necessary to board a plane in the mid-1970s) except when traveling to/from border-adjacent areas and controlled cities. Nevertheless, passports were necessary for temporary propiska in a number of situations such as checking in a hotel or renting a private dwelling (no marks were placed in the document).

Moreover, in the late 1980s and early 1990s, Soviet internal passports, accompanied with a special leaflet, were valid for traveling to most Comecon countries and Yugoslavia as a member of a touristic group. The leaflet functioned as an equivalent of exit visa stamped in international passports; destination countries did not require entry visas at that time.

==== Russian Federation ====
In 1992, passports, or other photo identification documents, became necessary to board a train. Train tickets started to bear passenger names, allegedly as an effort to combat speculative reselling of the tickets.

The dissolution of the Soviet Union invoked the need to distinguish Russian citizens among the citizens of the former Soviet Union.

On 9 December 1992, special leaves were introduced which were affixed in Soviet passports, certifying that the bearer of the passport was a citizen of Russia. These leaves were optional unless travelling to the other former Soviet republics which continued to accept Soviet passports; for other occasions, other proofs of citizenship were accepted as well. Issuance of the leaves continued until the end of 2002.

On 8 July 1997, the current design of the Russian internal passport was introduced. Unlike the Soviet passports, which had three photo pages, the new passports have one. A passport is first issued at the age of 14 and then replaced upon at the ages of 20 and 45. The text in the passports is in Russian. Passports issued in autonomous entities may, on the bearer's request, contain an additional leaf duplicating all data in one of the official local languages.

A passport exchange was begun; the deadline was initially set at end of 2001 but then prolonged several times and finally set at 30 June 2004. The government had first regulated that having failed to exchange one's passport would constitute a punishable violation. However, the Supreme Court ruled to the effect that citizens cannot be obliged to exchange their passports. The Soviet passports ceased to be valid as means of personal identification since mid-2004, but it is still legal (though barely practicable) to have one.

The propiska was formally abandoned soon after adoption of the current Constitution in 1993, and replaced with Resident registration system which, in principle, was simply notification of one's place of residence.

Nevertheless, under the new regulations, permanent registration records are stamped in citizens' internal passports just as were propiskas. That has led to the widespread misconception that registration was just a new name for the propiska; many continue to call it a "propiska". The misconception is partly reinforced by the fact that the existing rules for registration make it an onerous process, dependent on the consent of landlords, which effectively prevents tenants of flats from registering.

Unlike with the propiska, it is not an offense not to have registration unless one resides in a particular dwelling for more than 90 days. From a practical point of view, the long deadline makes it difficult to prove avoidance of residency registration and so to prosecute. De facto citizens have no restriction on where they reside (with the exception of closed cities or near borders). Still, many civil rights are dependent on registration, such as the right to vote.

In November 2010, the Federal Migration Service announced the possible cancellation of internal passports, which, if it were implemented, would be replaced by plastic ID cards or drivers' licenses. In 2013, a plastic ID card, Universal electronic card was introduced, and any citizen had the right to reject it and retain an old-style internal passport. This card system was abandoned in January 2017.

==== Belarus ====
In Belarus, internal passports and passports for travelling abroad were merged into one kind of document in 1991. Passports are the primary means of identification for citizens of Belarus both in homeland and abroad. Belarusian citizens must have a passport after they have reached the age of 14; passports can also be issued to younger children for travelling abroad. Passports are valid for 10 years regardless of age.

Apart from visa pages, a considerable number of pages in Belarusian passports are designated for "internal" records, such as place of residence and marriage. Citizens had to obtain special stamp enabling the passport bearer to cross the border of the Union State before 2005 when the Constitutional Court ruled the practice not conforming to the Constitution.

Combination of primary identification document with international passport causes significant inconvenience to bearers who cannot certify their identity while their passports are processed for visas in embassies and consulates. A passport can also be easily invalidated by a careless foreign passport control official by placing a stamp in a reserved page.

=== China and neighbors ===
The internal passport system in China and some neighbors evolved from an ancient huji system of family register. The system has evolved to manage internal movement, distribution of welfare, and other rights.

==== People's Republic of China ====
The People's Republic of China (PRC) maintains a system of residency registration in mainland China known as hukou, by which government permission is needed to formally change one's place of residence. It is enforced with identity cards. This system effectively controlled internal migration before the 1980s, but subsequent market reforms caused it to collapse as a means of migration control. An estimated 150 to 200 million people are part of the "blind flow" and have unofficially migrated, generally from poor, rural areas to wealthy, urban ones. However, unofficial residents are often denied official services such as education and medical care and are sometimes subject to both social and political discrimination.

=== Germany ===
The Kennkarte was the basic identity document in use inside Germany (including occupied incorporated territories) during the Third Reich era. They were first introduced in July 1938. Due to legal arguments, the first cards were not issued until June 1941. They were normally obtained through a police precinct and bore the stamps of the corresponding issuing office and official. Every male German citizen aged 18 and older, and every Jewish citizen (both male and female) was issued one and was expected to produce it when confronted by officials. German authorities continued to issue them until 1943.

=== Sweden ===
Internal passports were abolished in Sweden in 1860.

=== United States of America ===
Throughout the Thirteen Colonies before the Revolutionary War, slaves confined to homes or agricultural plantations, or whose movements were limited by curfews, could be required to furnish written evidence their owner had granted an exemption to permit their free movement. For example, the New Hampshire Assembly in 1714 passed "An Act To Prevent Disorders In The Night":

Whereas great disorders, insolencies and burglaries are oft times raised and committed in the night time by Indian, Negro, and Molatto Servants and Slaves to the Disquiet and hurt of her Majesty, No Indian, Negro, or Molatto is to be from Home after 9 o'clock.

Notices emphasizing the curfew were published in The New Hampshire Gazette in 1764 and 1771.

Internal passports were required for African Americans in the southern slave states before the American Civil War, for example, an authenticated internal passport dated 1815 was presented to Massachusetts citizen George Barker to allow him to freely travel as a free black man to visit relatives in slave states. After many of these states seceded, forming the Confederate States of America, the central Confederate government not only systematized this system but required internal passports for whites as well.

Such an internalized passport in the U.S. today would be unconstitutional under the Privileges and Immunities Clause.

== See also ==
- 101st kilometre
- Closed city
- Hukou
- International passport
- Propiska
- Wolf's ticket (Russia)
- Real ID Act
- Internally displaced person
- Internal colonialism
- Internal migration
- Statute of Cambridge 1388
- Subnational citizenship
