= Russian passport =

Travel document issued to citizens of Russia

- The front cover of a Russian international biometric passport
- Type: Passport
- Issued by: Ministry of Internal Affairs
- First issued: 1997 (non-biometric, handwritten); 2000 (non-biometric, MRP); 2006 (biometric); March 1, 2010 (biometric, current version)
- Purpose: Identification, proof of citizenship
- Eligibility: Russian Federation citizenship
- Expiration: 10 years (biometric), 5 years (non-biometric)
- Cost: 6000₽ for biometric passport, 2000₽ for non-biometric

The Russian passport (Russian: Заграничный паспорт гражданина Российской Федерации, romanized: Zagranichnyy pasport grazhdanina Rossiyskoy Federatsii, lit. 'Transborder passport of a citizen of the Russian Federation') is a biometric travel document issued by the Ministry of Internal Affairs to Russian citizens for international travel. This external Russian passport is distinct from the internal Russian passport, which is a mandatory identity document for travel and identification purposes within Russia. Russian citizens must use their Russian passports when leaving or entering Russia, unless traveling to/from a country where the internal Russian passport is recognised as a valid travel document.

After the dissolution of the Soviet Union in 1991, the Soviet passport continued to be issued until 1997 with a validity of 5 years, when the first modern Russian passport is known to be issued. The first version of passports issued in 1997 was handwritten. Passports issued from 2000 to 2010 were machine-readable passports, had a validity of 5 years and included 36 pages. In 2006, Russia issued the first machine-readable biometric passports and in 2010, the design of the biometric passports was modified to include 46 pages and have a validity of 10 years.

Citizens under 18 traveling without either of their parents must have written consent of both parents allowing their departure from the country. When a child travels with one parent, consent of another parent is not required. Articles 20 and 21 of the Federal Law "On the entry in the Russian Federation and departure from the Russian Federation" govern only departure from Russia and have nothing to do with the requirements of other countries regarding entry to these countries.

In addition to regular passports there are two special-purpose types of passports for travelling abroad: diplomatic passports and service passports (issued to government employees abroad on official business).

== History ==
=== Russian Empire ===
Foreigners arriving in Russia were met with various restrictions during the Tsarist period; border magistrates would allow foreigners to pass within the state only with the permission of the senior government. Under Peter I, internal migration increased and as a result, the state introduced documents that travelers were required to keep so that they could track the movement of people and goods throughout the empire. The introduction of these documents also had a lot to do with the state's ability to impose proper conscription and head tax measures.

Under the legislation in force for the period of 1906 in Russia in the place of residence, as a general rule, the passport was not required. The capital and other cities which declared an emergency situation or enhanced protection were the exception. In addition, in areas that were subject to the rules on the supervision of industrial establishments, the workers of factories and plants were required to have a passport, and in the place of permanent residence. A passport was not needed when absent from the place of permanent residence: 1) within the district and outside it as recently as 50 vents and no more than 6 months, and 2) from the persons hired for rural work, – in addition, within the townships adjacent to the county of residence, even if more than 6 months.

Law of June 10, 1902 the regulations on residence permits June 3, 1894 extended to the provinces of the Kingdom of Poland, with some modifications. Formed in 1902, the committee on the needs of the agricultural industry is recognized as desirable in the types of facilitating the movement of agricultural workers, the simplification of passport regulations. A special meeting of the needs of the agricultural industry has been entrusted to the Minister of Internal Affairs of the revision of statutes on residence permits, in the sense of saving for a passport solely value of an identity document. Elaborated on these grounds in 1905, a new draft statute was a passport to postpone consideration until the convocation of the State Duma.

=== Russian Soviet Federative Socialist Republic ===
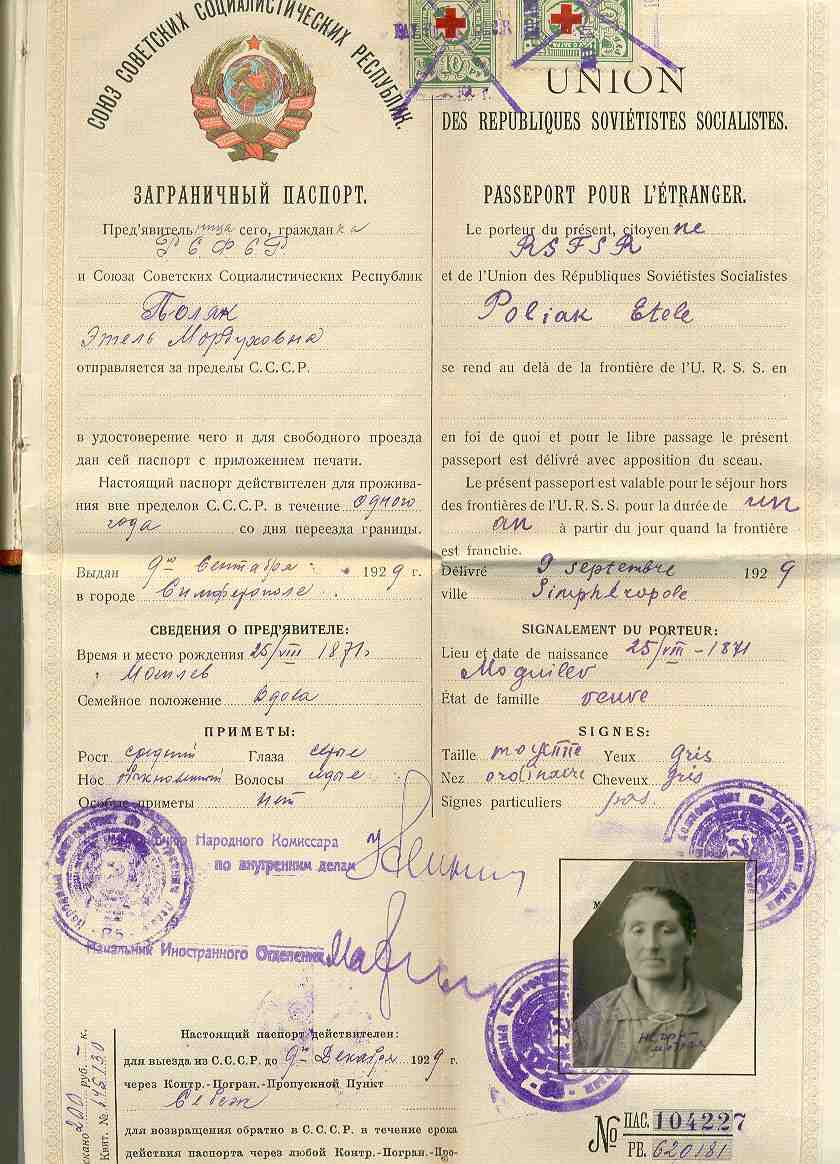
Soviet external passport 1929

Immediately after the Russian Revolution the Russian Republic not followed the emigration; Many disagreed with the new regime left the country since 1917 to the end of the 1920s left the country about 8,000 people, including about 500 scientists (for comparison, in the period from 1989 to 2004, according to various estimates from 25,000 to 80,000 scientists left Russia). In 1922, two flights so-called philosophical ship from Petrograd to Stettin and several ships from the territory of Ukraine and trains from Moscow on the personal instructions of Lenin were expelled 225 intellectuals (philosophers Berdyaev, Ilyin, Frank and Bulgakov). Of the emigrants only a small part returned, such as Marina Tsvetaeva and Alexei Tolstoy.

By the mid-1930s the Soviet government sealed the borders. Traveling to capitalist countries was only possible to employees of the Foreign Ministry, the nomenklatura and selected artists while most ordinary Soviet citizens had the opportunity to travel only in socialist countries with trade union tours.

The third and final wave of Soviet emigration coincided with the rupture of relations with Israel. June 10, 1968 the Central Committee received a joint letter to the leadership of the Foreign Ministry and the KGB signed by Andrey Gromyko and Yuri Andropov to the proposal to allow Soviet Jews to emigrate from the country. As a result, in the 1970s only about 4,000 people had left, many against their will, for example, such well-known dissidents as Brodsky, Aksenov, Aleshkovsky, Voinovich, Dovlatov, Gorenstein, Galich.

On May 20, 1991, a few months before the collapse of the USSR, the last Soviet law on the exit of citizens abroad was adopted, according to which citizens could leave at the request of the state, public and religious organisations and enterprises.

=== The Russian Federation ===
In 1993, exit visas were canceled and free issuing of passports was allowed. The right to freely leave the country was enshrined in a 1996 law. Soviet passports with the symbols of the Soviet Union were issued to citizens of the Russian Federation until the end of 1997, to be replaced by machine-readable Russian passports. The last Soviet passports issued had an expiration date at the end of 2002, about 10 years after the dissolution of the Soviet state. Since 2001, Russian passports have been issued with a design which includes the emblem of Russia, a double-headed eagle. Since 2010, the application for the registration of a passport can be submitted via the Gosuslugi website.

In 2006, biometric passports were introduced in Russia. Since 2009, in all regions of Russia there are points of issue of passport and visa documents of new generation (passports containing electronic media). The data of these items come in a single personalisation center. After 1 March 2010, biometric passport are valid for 10 years. The data on the chip Russian passports are protected by a technology access control BAC (basic access control), which allows producing read data only after entering the passport number, date of birth of the holder and the expiration date of the passport (usually by means of recognition of the machine readable zone of the passport), which excludes unauthorised access to data on the chip.

The holders of Russian Federation passports issued in Crimea and Sevastopol after their 2014 annexation, territory that is internationally recognized as a foreign-occupied part of Ukraine, do not have their passports recognized by the United States, and are denied European Schengen-zone visas (although Crimean residents who hold Ukrainian biometric passports can visit the EU visa-free). Canada and the United States are also refusing to recognize passports that Russia started issuing in 2019 to Ukrainians in the non-government-controlled parts of the Donbas region of eastern Ukraine, and the European Union was considering their non-recognition. Authorities in the Russian-occupied city of Kherson in southern Ukraine have handed out Russian passports to local residents during 2022 invasion.

== Description ==
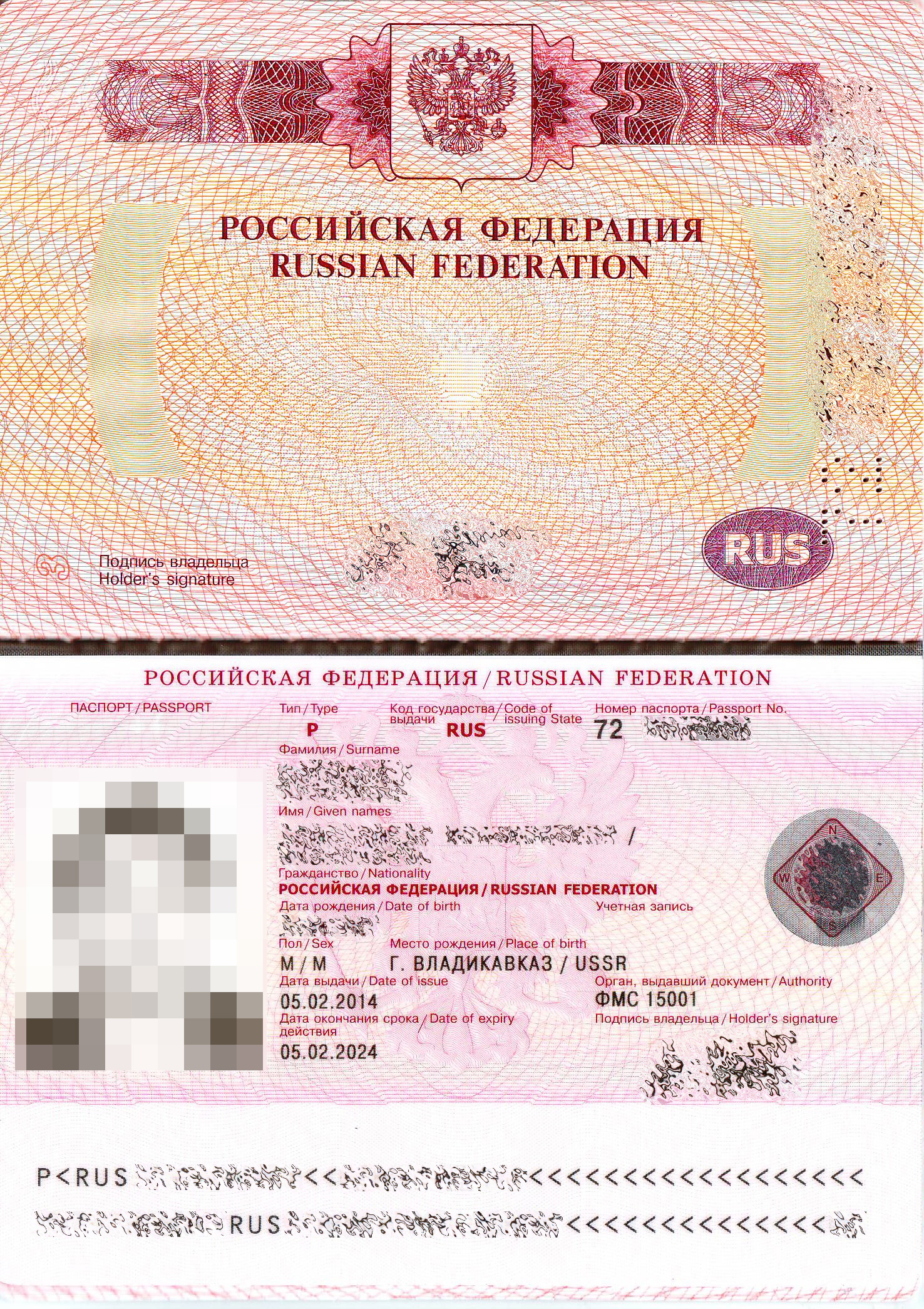
Data page and signature page of a biometric international passport (2014)

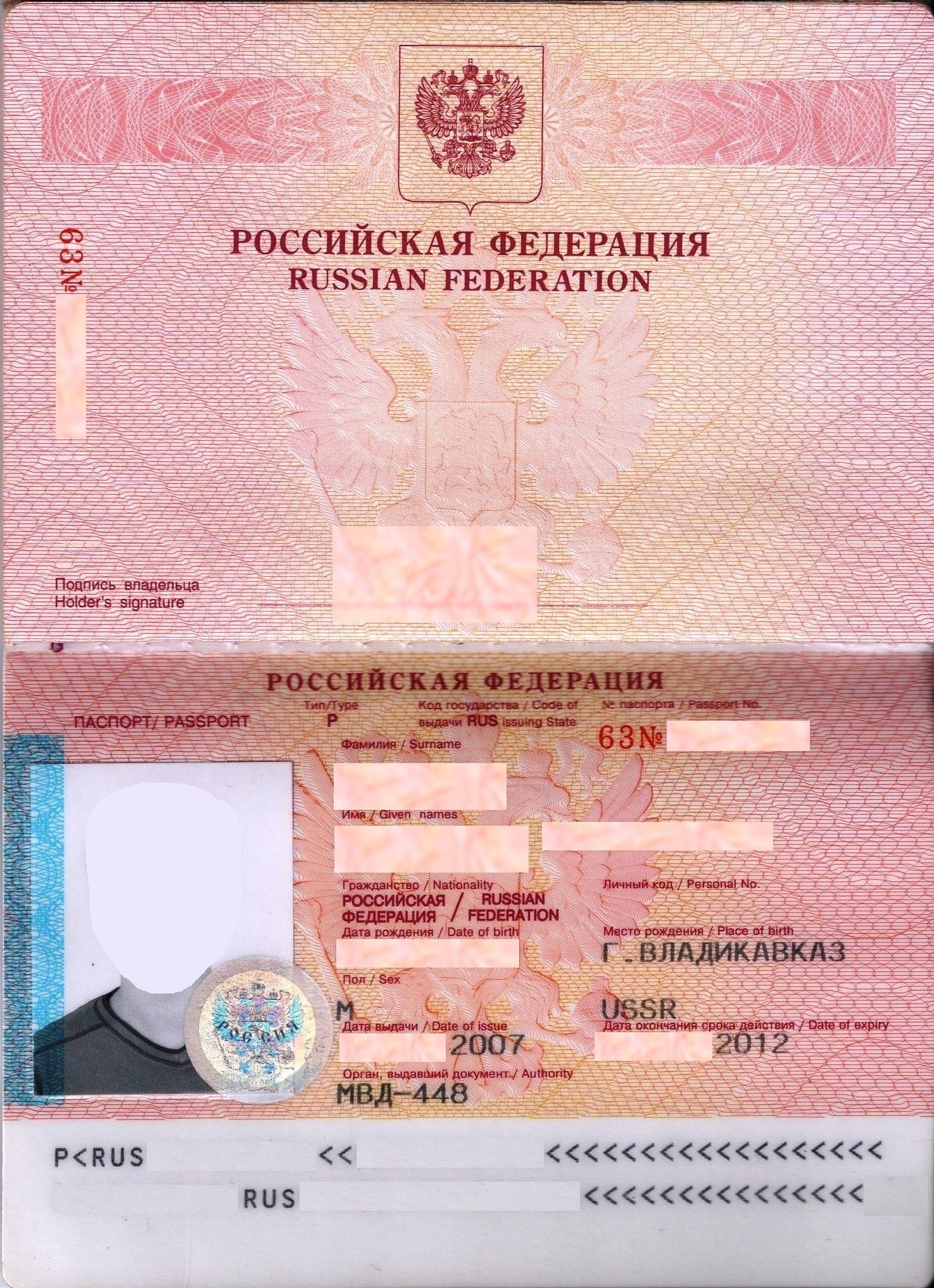
Data page and signature page of a non-biometric international passport (2007)

Each passport has a data page and a signature page. A data page has a visual zone and a machine-readable zone. The visual zone has a digitized photograph of the passport holder, data about the passport, and data about the passport owner:

- Photograph
- Type of document ("P" for "passport")
- Code of the issuing country (always 'RUS')
- Passport number
- Surname
- Given name(s)
- Nationality (always 'Russian Federation')
- Date of birth (DD.MM.YYYY format)
- Place of birth
- Sex
- Date of issue (DD.MM.YYYY format)
- Date of expiration (DD.MM.YYYY format)
- Authority
- A facsimile of the owner's signature, scanned from the application form

At the bottom of the data page is a machine-readable zone, which can be read both visually and by an optical scanner. The machine-readable zone consists of two lines. There are no blank spaces in either line. A space which does not contain a letter or a number is filled with "<".

The first line of the machine-readable zone contains a letter to denote the type of travel document ("P" for passport), the code for the issuing country ("RUS" for "Russian Federation"), and the name (surname first, then given names) of the passport holder.

The second line of the machine-readable zone contains the passport number (supplemented by a check digit), the code of the citizenship of the passport holder ("RUS" for "Russian Federation"), the date of birth of the passport holder (supplemented by a check digit), a notation of the sex/gender of the passport owner ("M" or "F"), the date of expiration of the passport (supplemented by a check digit), and, at the very end of the line, one or more overall check digits.

A signature page has a line for the signature of a passport holder. A passport is not valid unless it is signed by the passport owner (except for passport owners under age of 14).

== Transliteration of Russian names ==
Due to the fact that Russian visas (and Russian internal passports since 2011) are intended for use in Russia only, there are certain other Latin letters as well as other alphanumerical symbols used to transliterate the letter with no direct analogue in Latin script into the machine-readable zone. As an example, the letter "ч" is usually transcribed as "ch" in Russian travel documents, however, Russian visas and internal passports use "3" in the machine-readable zone instead. Another example is "Alexei" (travel passport) => "Алексей" (Cyrillic version) => "ALEKSEQ" (machine-readable version in an internal document)

== Types of passports ==
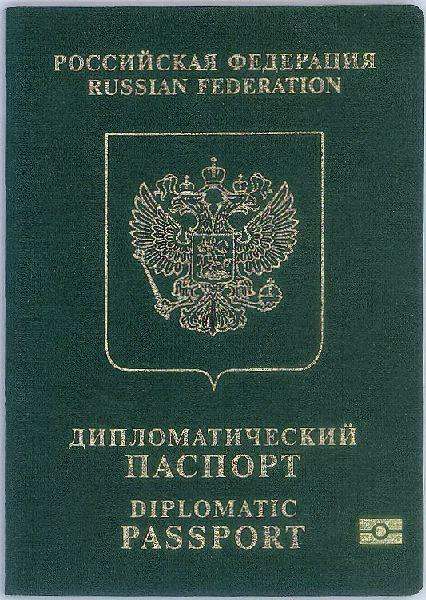
Cover of the Russian diplomatic e-passport

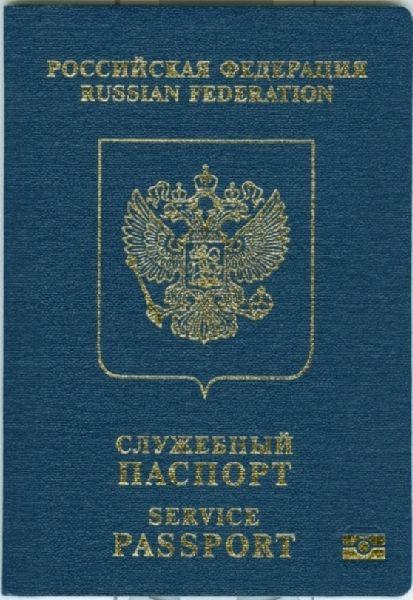
Cover of the Russian service e-passport

Regular (red cover)
Issuable to all citizens of the Russian Federation. Period of validity is 10 years from the date of issue for biometric passports and 5 years for non-biometric passports.
Diplomatic (green cover)
Issuable to Russian diplomats accredited overseas and their eligible dependents, and to citizens who reside in the Russian Federation and travel abroad for diplomatic work. Passport issued for the period of work, but no more than 10 years.
Service (blue cover)
Issuable to Russian federal and regional civil servants assigned overseas, their eligible dependents, to members of the Russian parliament who travel abroad on official business and to judges of the Supreme and Constitutional Courts. Also issued to military personnel when deployed overseas. Period of validity: length of service, but not to exceed 10 years.
Certificate for return
Issuable to Russian citizens and nationals overseas, in urgent circumstances. This document is valid only for return to the Russian Federation.

== Second passport ==
Russia's law allows its citizens to legally hold two valid Russian external passports at the same time:

- The passport is held at the consulate during the processing of visas. A citizen who holds a second passport may not expect to obtain a visa for other trips or to apply for other visas. This method only works in some cases: for example, when applying for a Schengen visa in the Russian Federation, all valid passports are required, not just one. The reason for this is the need to be in the country at the time of visa issuance. The possibility of using this method should be clarified in advance.
- Several countries have a negative attitude towards travellers visiting countries unfriendly to the country of entry, up to and including refusal of entry (for example, a citizen may be refused entry to Iran if his passport contains a mark of a visit to Israel. Having a second passport, one can try to conceal the fact of such visits from the immigration officials. The feature of the second passport is that it can only be a biometric one. Such a passport is issued for a separate validity period of 10 years (regardless of the expiry date of the first passport).

== Passport message ==
Russian passports do not have a passport message. Passports of most countries of the world contain a special message, usually given in several languages, called a passport message. The message is addressed to representatives of foreign governments. In this message, the issuing state requests that the passport bearer be allowed unhindered passage, travel and necessary assistance.

== Visa requirements map ==
Visa requirements for Russian citizens Russian Federation Freedom of movement Visa not required, internal passport valid Visa not required / ETA Visa available both on arrival or online Visa on arrival Visa-free for group tourists eVisa / Online visa Visa required Admission generally refused

Visa requirements for Russian citizens are administrative entry restrictions by the authorities of other countries placed on citizens of Russia. As of 2025, Russian citizens had visa-free or visa on arrival access to 114 countries and territories, ranking the Russian passport 43th in terms of travel freedom (tied with Turkey passport) according to the Henley Passport index.

The Russian passport along with the Turkish passport are the highest ranking passports whose holders are still required visas for their travels to the European Union, the United States, the United Kingdom, and Canada.

== Foreign travel statistics ==
According to the national statistics these are the numbers of Russian visitors arriving to various countries per annum:

Foreign travel statistics
Destination	Number of visitors from Russia	Year
Abkhazia | Georgia	4,357,937	2017
Afghanistan	1,463	2017
American Samoa	6	2016
Angola	7,305	2015
Antarctica	330	2017
Antigua and Barbuda	372	2017
Argentina	8,138	2015
Armenia	410,302	2017
Aruba	968	2015
Australia	15,200	2017
Austria (Note: Counting only guests in tourist accommodation establishments.)	272,300	2016
Azerbaijan	744,125	2016
Bahamas	1,498	2015
Bahrain	12,712	2017
Barbados	909	2016
Belgium	60,386	2016
Belarus	1,230,000	2017
Bermuda (Note: Data for arrivals by air only.)	101	2015
Bhutan	243	2016
Bolivia	1,745	2016
Bosnia and Herzegovina	5,268	2017
Botswana	1,065	2015
Brazil	18,820	2017
Bulgaria	522,085	2018
Cambodia	53,164	2016
Cameroon	7,151	2014
Canada	24,401	2017
Cayman Islands	65	2017
Chile	6,003	2017
China	1,976,000	2016
Colombia	5,157	2015
Congo	4,023	2012
Costa Rica	4,657	2017
Croatia	119,689	2017
Cuba	75,000	2017
Cyprus	63,778	2025
Czech Republic	551,191	2017
Denmark	41,002	2017
Dominica	44	2015
Dominican Republic	245,346	2017
Ecuador	7,313	2014
Egypt	2,338,900	2015
Estonia	1,803,249 / 238,636	2017
Finland	3,629,121 / 373,701	2018
France	620,028	2015
French Polynesia	287	2017
Georgia	1,579,764	2025
Germany	607,422	2016
Greece	512,789	2015
Guam	3,352	2017
Guatemala	2,576	2014
Hong Kong	148,098	2017
Hungary	138,941	2016
Iceland	14,282	2018
India	278,904	2017
Indonesia	88,520	2016
Iran	24,336	2017
Iraq	2,451	2017
Israel	330,500	2017
Italy	864,000	2016
Jamaica	1,018	2017
Japan	77,200	2017
Jordan	49,384	2016
Kazakhstan	1,708,873	2017
Kyrgyzstan	471,400	2017
Laos	10,986	2017
Latvia	424,842 / 241,435	2017
Lebanon	16,205	2016
Lithuania	742,333 / 150,600	2016
Luxembourg	6,659	2016
Macao	27,037	2017
Madagascar	264	2015
Malaysia	67,564	2017
Maldives	61,931	2017
Malta	16,370	2016
Malawi	154	2009
Mali	444	2014
Mauritius	11,153	2017
Mexico	32,337	2015
Moldova	314,266	2017
Monaco	46,000	2016
Mongolia	106,935	2017
Montenegro	316,826	2016
Morocco	20,000	2017
Myanmar	5,487	2016
Namibia	2,943	2015
Netherlands	175,000	2017
New Zealand	6,640	2017
Nicaragua	1,464	2016
North Macedonia	4,213	2016
Northern Mariana Islands	2,130	2017
North Korea	9,985	2025
Norway	138,902	2017
Oman	4,858	2017
Pakistan	2,500	2009
Palau	337	2016
Panama	4,525	2015
Papua New Guinea	414	2016
Peru	8,648	2017
Philippines	33,279	2017
Poland	2,052,400	2016
Portugal	98,000	2015
Qatar	87,595	2017
Romania	66,734	2016
Saudi Arabia	7,745	2017
Serbia	184,609	2024
Seychelles	13,191	2017
Singapore	80,134	2017
Slovakia	35,919	2016
Slovenia	51,803	2017
South Africa	7,244	2015
South Korea	270,427	2017
South Ossetia	451,918	2017
Spain	1,222,426	2018
Sri Lanka	59,191	2017
Sudan	268	2017
Suriname	72	2017
Sweden	63,689	2017
Switzerland	251,142	2017
Taiwan	9,226	2017
Tajikistan	212,062	2019
Tanzania	7,435	2016
Thailand	1,898,837	2025
Tunisia	520,000	2017
Turkey	5,964,631	2018
Turkmenistan	27,490	2017
Ukraine	1,464,764	2017
United Arab Emirates	530,000	2017
United Kingdom	199,000	2017
United States (Note: Total number includes tourists, business travelers, students, exchange visitors, temporary workers and families, diplomats and other representatives and all other classes of nonimmigrant admissions (I-94).)	344,368	2017
Uruguay	3,114	2015
Uzbekistan	567,700	2022
Venezuela	9,035	2013
Vietnam	574,164	2017

== Issue time ==
According to the federal law and the orders from 2012 and 2014 for the old 5-year laminated and the new 10-year biometric passport, respectively, either document has to be issued within one to four months, depending on circumstances, with the issue time being three months in case of an application being made to a consulate outside of Russia.

However, in practice, some consulates require an appointment to be made prior to the applicant being able to provide documents to apply for the passport, in some cases, appointments can only be available many months or even possibly years into the future, effectively undoing the upper limit for a timely issuance of the travel document.

Additionally, if passports are expired or lost, applications for the new passport are routinely declined to be accepted when abroad, prior to the verification of citizenship, for which the consuls require a separate application to be made, either in person or notarised by a notary public, with the processing times for verification itself often exceeding many months. Such practice of causing the extra costs for the applicant, however, seems to be in violation of point 23 of orders 10303 from 2012-06-28 and 3744 from 2014-03-19, which guarantee that no extra services are required in order to apply for a passport.

== See also ==
- Soviet Union passport
- Visa requirements for Russian citizens
- Identity card of the Russian Armed Forces
- Internal passport of Russia
- Universal electronic card
- Visa policy of Russia
- Passport system in the Soviet Union
- Migration card
- Propiska in the Soviet Union
- Wolf ticket (Russia)
- 101st kilometre
- Closed cities
