= Resident registration in Russia =

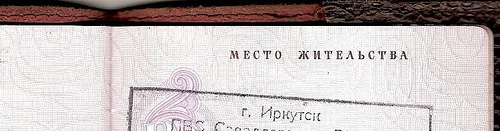
Text in Russian: "place of residence: Irkutsk". Almost every citizen has such a stamp in their internal Russian passport about registration at the place of residence (sometimes still called "propiska").

Resident registration in Russia is the system that records the residence and internal migration of Russian citizens. The present system was introduced on October 1, 1993, and replaced the prior repressive mandatory Soviet system of propiska. The word "propiska" is still widely used colloquially to refer to the registration program.

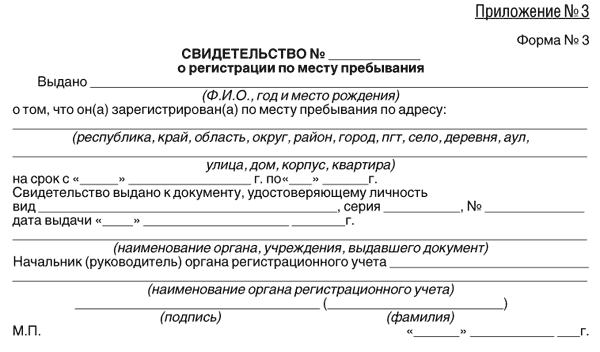
Registration certificate

According to a Russian Constitutional Court decision, registration or absence of registration cannot affect any rights of a citizen. Citizens exercise registration and deregistration on a voluntary basis.

Under the current registration program, Russian citizens must register if they live in the same place for 90 days (for Belarusian citizens in Russia and vice versa, registration is required after 30 days).

There are two types of registration:

- Registration of citizens at the place of residence (so called "permanent registration" or sometimes "permanent propiska" / "propiska")
- Registration of citizens at the place of temporary residence (so called "temporary registration" or sometimes "temporary propiska")

A place of permanent registration is indicated on a stamp made in an internal passport, and a place of temporary registration is written on a separate paper.

Living in a dwelling without a permanent or temporary registration is considered an administrative offence in Russia.

Registration is used for economic, law enforcement and other purposes, such as accounting social benefits, housing and utility payments, taxes, conscription, and medical care. Many documents and rights may be obtained only at the place where a citizen has permanent registration, which causes problems, for example, when obtaining or changing passports, voting, or getting inquiry papers, which are often required in Russia.

Registration determines the location where citizens receive pension payments and obtain internal and foreign Russian passports, and it affects the size and cost of housing and utilities services. Registration is also said to have a public safety significance.

The registration service is managed by the Ministry of Internal Affairs, which also handles immigration control.

== Registration and employment ==
In 2004 Supreme Court of Russia banned discrimination based on residential registration. Current Russian labour code contains direct prohibition to require local registration for employing Russian citizens.

== History ==
The institute of propiska was found unlawful by Committee of Constitutional Supervision of the USSR in 1991 and officially discontinued in Russia in 1993.

In December 1993, the new Constitution of Russia came into force.

The "Law on Russian citizens' right to freedom of movement..." regarding registration was adopted by Supreme Soviet of the Russian Federation in June 1993.

In 1996 and 1998, the Constitutional Court of Russia liberalized some provisions of the legislation and nullified some restrictive laws that had been enacted by local authorities.

In 2005, the Government of Russia extended the registration-free period to 90 days for internal movements. Temporary registration is needed only for temporary residences of 91-days or longer.

== See also ==
- Resident registration
- Propiska in the Soviet Union
- Internal passport of Russia
- Russian passport
- Visa policy of Russia
