= Migration card =

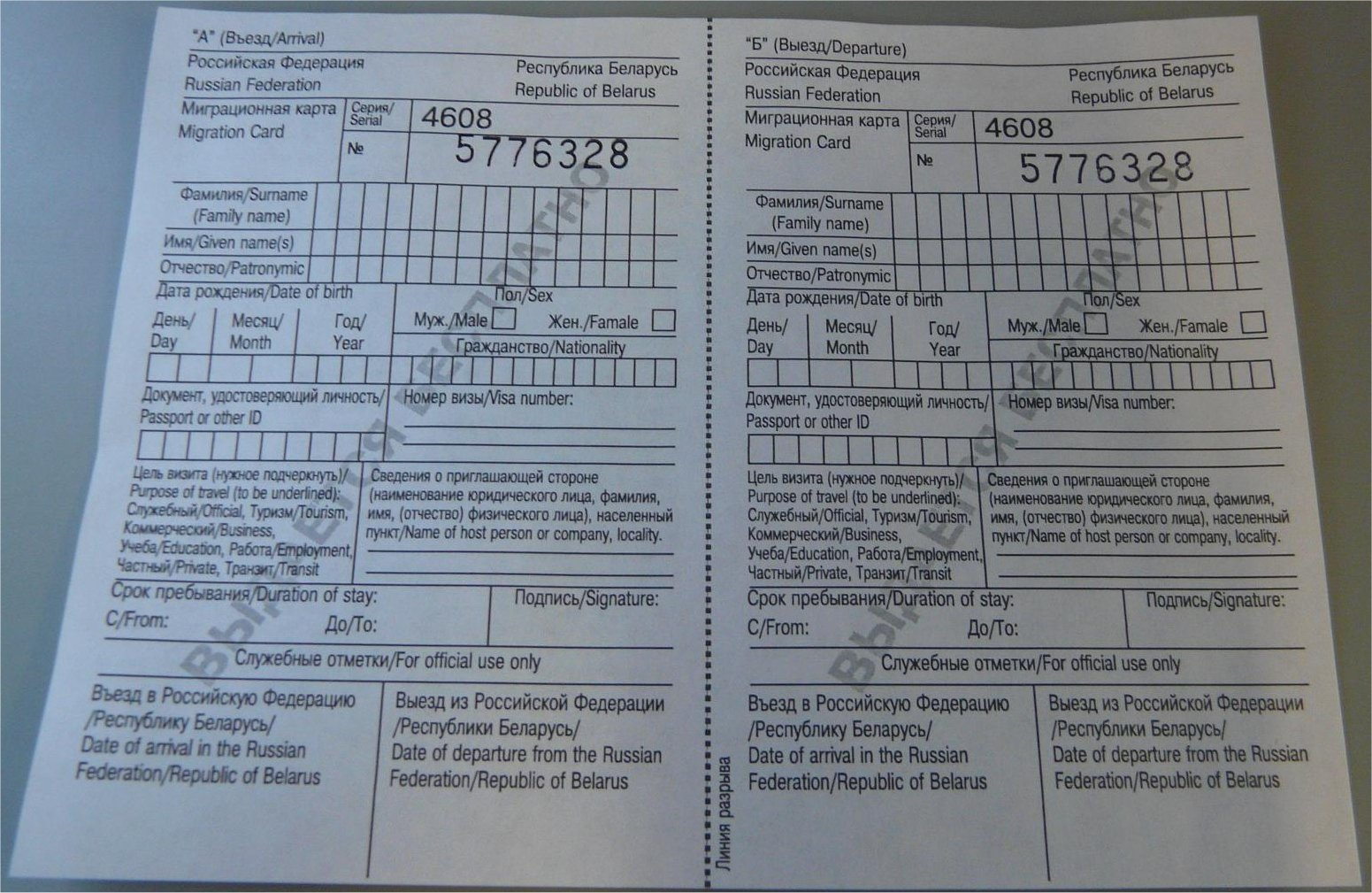

Migration card (Russian: Миграционная карта) is an identity document in the Union State of Russia and Belarus for foreign nationals. Originally they were bilingual (Russian/English), but were changed into Russian-only. The responses to the questionnaire in it may still be completed in English.

The card is issued in two identical parts which should be filled out identically by the traveler. Part A is surrendered to the immigration officer upon entrance to Russia, while part B, stamped by the officer, must be kept with the passport to be presented to the Russian or Belarusian officials whenever an identity check is demanded. Upon each Union State border crossing the arrival/departure must be stamped on the migration card. Alternatively, the card may be surrendered upon departure and a new one received upon subsequent arrival.

A migration card must be produced along with a passport in order to register a foreign citizen. Registration must be done within 7 business days of arrival at each new place of stay in Russia, and within 5 business days in Belarus. (These terms are prolonged for citizens of certain countries.) The process is colloquially called "registering one's visa" though it applies to visa-exempt foreign nationals as well.

Before the new law "About Migration Registration" of January 15, 2007, the registration procedure was done by the local Passport and Visa Department (Russian: ПВУ) or Visa and Registration Department (Russian: ОВИР) of the Russian Ministry of Internal Affairs (MVD), typically at a local militsiya office. The residence registration could be denied, but if approved, the migration card would be stamped.

Since adoption of the new law it became sufficient to inform the Federal Migration Service, either in person or through a post office using a special form. Migration cards are not stamped if registering through a post office.

The loss of a migration card is subject to fine.

Electronic migration cards are planned, with Moscow being the first city to issue them.

Similar systems are also used in Ukraine and some other countries.

== History ==
Migration cards for non-CIS foreigners have been issued since November 22, 2002, starting from the foreigners who arrived to Moscow.

Migration cards for CIS citizens were introduced since January 1, 2003. Initially they were issued to the migrants who are already within Russia. Since February 14, 2003 the cards started to be issued on the Russian border (except border with Belarus). Belarus soon started to issue migration cards on the Union State border, too. All CIS migrants within Russia were required to obtain migration cards by the end of March 2003 under the threat of prosecution up to deportation.

== See also ==
- Andean Migration Card
- Belarusian citizenship
- Citizenship of Russia
- Internal passport of Russia
- Russian passport
- Visa policy of Belarus
- Visa policy of Russia
- Form I-94, the Arrival-Departure Record form used by the U.S. Citizenship and Immigration Services
