= Propiska in the Soviet Union =

A propiska (Russian: прописка;[prɐˈpʲiskə] pl. прописки propiski) was both a written residency permit and a migration-recording tool, used in the Russian Empire before 1917 and in the Soviet Union from 1932 until 1991.

The Soviet Union had both permanent propiski (прописка по месту жительства [propiska po mestu zhitel'stva] or постоянная прописка [postojannaja propiska]) and temporary (временная прописка, vremennaja propiska). In the transition period to a market economy in the aftermath of the collapse of the Soviet Union in late 1991, the permanent propiska in municipal apartments was a factor that allowed dwellers to obtain private property rights on the living space they were "inscripted" in during privatization. Those who built housing at their own expense obtained a permanent propiska there by definition.

== Etymology ==
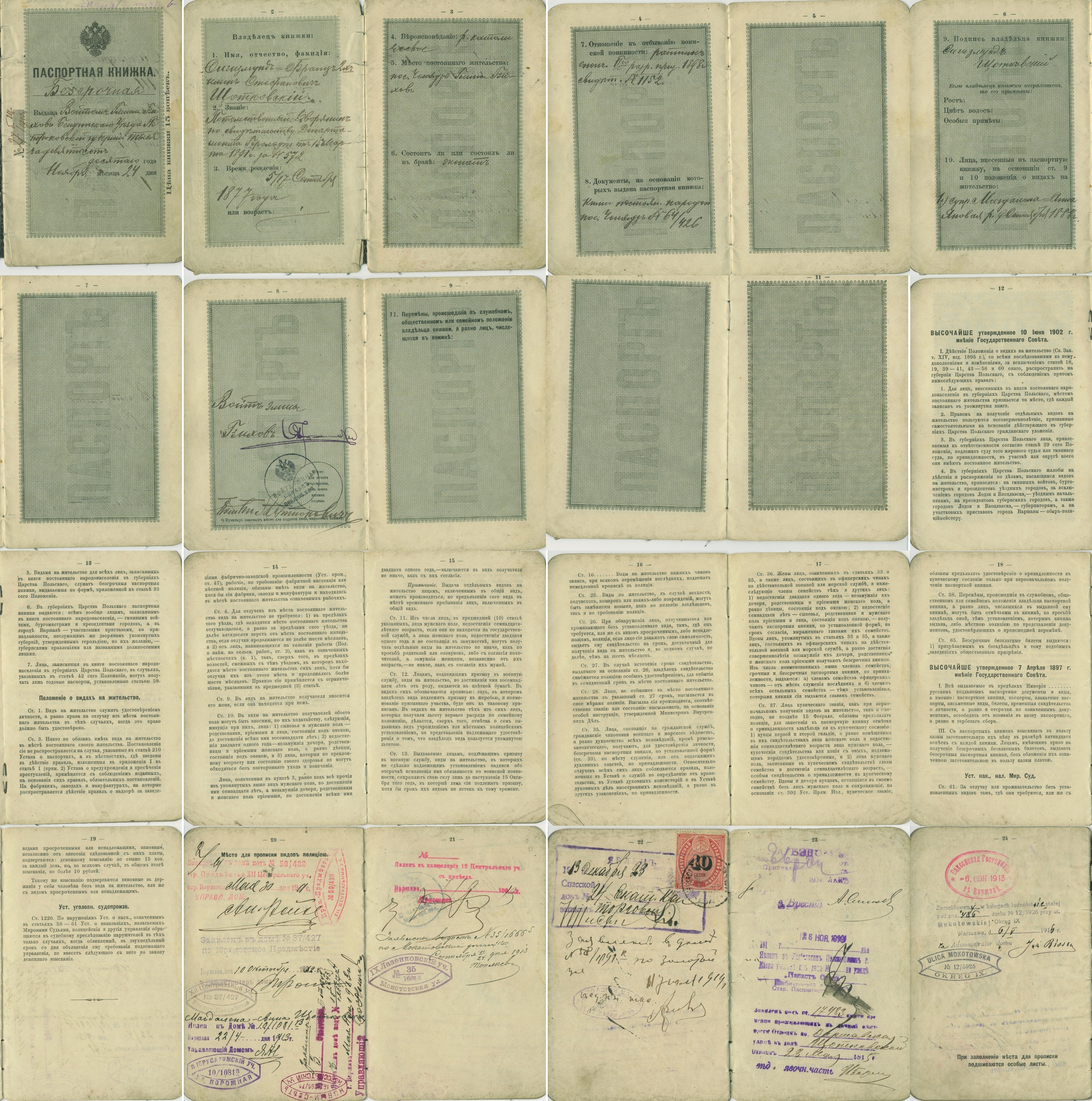
An internal passport, issued 1910 in Imperial Russia

Originally, the noun propiska meant the clerical procedure of registration, or enrolling the person (writing his or her name) into the police records of the local population (or writing down the police permission into the person's identification document – see below). Dahl's Explanatory Dictionary describes this procedure as "to enroll [the document] in a book and stamp it".

The twentieth page of the internal passport of the Russian Empire (see illustration) was entitled Место для пропи́ски ви́довъ поли́цiею 'Space for registration of vidy by police'. Five blank pages (20 to 24) were gradually filled with stamps with the residential address written in. It allowed a person to reside in his/her relevant locality. Article 61 of the Regulations adopted on February 7, 1897 (see pp. 18–19 of the passport) imposed a fine for those found outside the administrative unit (as a rule, uezd) in which they were registered to live.

As a clerical term, the noun вид (vid) is short for вид на жительство (vid na zhitel'stvo). Although translated into English as a 'residential permit', in Russian this also conveys a presence of the right of a resident to live somewhere. In the sense of a "[legal] right" the word vid also appears in the phrase иметь на неё виды (imet' na nejo vidy; 'planning to gain husband's rights with her'). Among many explanations of вид, Dahl's Explanatory Dictionary indicates a "certificate of any kind for free passage, travel and living", mentioning passport as a synonym.

The verb прописать (propisat') was used as a transitive verb with вид4 being the direct object. Not only the passport, but also its owner could serve as the verb's direct object. Reciprocally, прописка became an object which one can have, e.g.: "to have a propiska in Moscow" (иметь прописку в Москве, imet' propisku v Moskve). In common speech, the stamp in the passport into which the residential address was written was also called "propiska".

== History ==
=== Russian Empire ===
The origin of the propiska dates back to the Russian Empire, more specifically Peter the Great who wanted to ensure "that serfs stayed in the fields where they belonged." In the pre-Soviet Russian Empire, a person arriving for a new residency was obliged, depending on the estate, to enroll in the registers of the local police authorities. The police could deny undesirable persons the right to settle. In this case, no stamps were made in passport). In most cases, this would mean the person had to return to their permanent domicile.

=== Soviet Union ===
Passports were abolished after the October Revolution and the free movement of people through the country was established. The 1930 edition of the Small Soviet Encyclopedia even described passports as a tool of control used by the former Tsarist police state. In December 1932, the Central Executive Committee and Sovnarkom, then under the leadership of Joseph Stalin, issued a decree that re-established a unified internal passport.

The noun propiska became associated with the result of residential registration. Permanent propiska (Russian: "постоя́нная пропи́ска") confirmed the housing rights of its owner. Temporary propiska (Russian: "вре́менная пропи́ска") could be provided alongside a permanent one when a resident had to live outside the permanent residence for a long period of time. As an example, students and workers leaving to study or work in other cities received temporary propiskas at their dorms, apartments, or hostels.

The decision to restrict internal migration was made against the backdrop of the massive social flux that originated from Stalin's far-reaching collectivization and industrialization efforts. Millions of people circulated through the country, for example to receive training or take on new jobs, but also to flee the threat of being repressed as a supposed kulak. In this explosive context, the regime hoped that the propiska system (and other mechanisms such as "labour books" that monitored work ethic) would restore a degree of order.

Even more importantly, the government aimed to stop the peasants from massively flooding to the towns in search of food as a result of the 1930–1933 famine. R. W. Davies and Stephen G. Wheatcroft note that the propiska was effective in this regard: "The growth of the urban population ceased, and was partly reversed, only as a result of restrictions on movement and the introduction of an internal passport system."

The newly reintroduced Soviet passport system was similar to that of the Russian Empire where passports were required mainly in the largest cities and in the territories adjacent to the country's external borders. Officers and soldiers always had special identity documents, while peasants could obtain internal passports only by a special application. In the USSR, the term residential permit (Russian: Вид на жи́тельство, romanized: vid na zhitelstvo) was used as a synonym for temporary propiska, particularly with regard to foreign nationals. By the end of the 1980s, when emigrants from the USSR could return, those who had lost Soviet citizenship could also apply for an identity document with this title.

The "passportization" of the citizen of the USSR reached its all-encompassing scope only in the 1970s: the right (and obligation) of every adult (from 16) to have a passport promoted the propiska as the primary lever of the regulation of migration. On the other hand, the propiska underlined the mechanism of the constitutional obligation of the state to provide everyone a dwelling: no one could be stripped of the propiska at one location without substitution with another permanent propiska location, even amidst the then-rarely-granted right to emigrate.

The propiska system persisted throughout most of the Soviet era. In 1990, the Gorbachev government started an investigation into illegalities in the governance system through a special "Committee of Constitutional Supervision". This committee found the propiska requirement to be illegal. The system was abolished on October 11, 1991.

== Implementation ==
=== The limit system for migrant workers ===
The system of a propiska limit (Russian: Лимит прописки) existed in the last 30 or so years of the USSR. This was the only means by which outsiders could settle in big cities like Moscow and Leningrad, except marriage. Often enterprises in large cities built hostels with dormitories at their own expense, to provide accommodation, with temporary "propiska" for migrant workers from elsewhere. After long-term employment at an enterprise, a worker could be given an apartment with permanent "propiska" rights to it. As opposed to an individual hostel room, which often shared a single bathroom and kitchen per floor and was ill-suited for family life.

Cities had a propiska limit for the low-wage city employers, such as street sweeps or janitors, because city natives shunned such occupations.

The native populations of large cities like Moscow often despised these migrant workers ('limit-dwellers' Russian: лими́тчики), considering them rude, uncultured, and violent. The derogatory term "limita" (Russian: лимита́) was used to refer to them.

Students from rural areas or smaller towns lived in similar students' hostels, with the termination of right of abode in the hostel on graduation or on exclusion from their schools.

=== Details of propiska ===
The propiska was recorded both in the internal passport of a Soviet citizen and at local governmental offices. In cities, it was a local office of a utility organisation, such as РЭУ (District Production Department), ЖЭК (Housing Committee Office), or ЖСК (Housing and Construction Cooperative). The passports were stamped at the local police precinct's Ministry of Internal Affairs (MVD) office, with the Military Comissariat (the draft body) also involved. In rural areas, it was a selsoviet, or "village council", a governing body of a rural territory.

A propiska could be permanent or temporary. The administrations of hostels, student dormitories, and landlords, (very rare case in the USSR, since the "sanitary norm", a minimum of 12 m^{2} (130 sq ft) per person, see below for further details, would usually cause rejection of temporary propiska for such a person), were obliged to maintain temporary propiska records of their guests. The propiska played the role of both residence permit and resident registration of a person.

Acquiring a propiska to move to a large city, especially Moscow, was extremely difficult for migrants and a matter of prestige. Even moving to live with relatives did not automatically provide a person with a permanent propiska because of a minimum area limit (12 m^{2} (130 sq ft)) for each resident of a specific apartment.

Owing to Soviet property regulations, officially based on the Universal Right to Housing for all, the permanent propiska, which provided the permanent right to dwell in this housing, was nearly impossible for authorities to terminate. The only major exception was a second criminal sentence. After serving the penalty for the first sentence, the inmate returned to the old permanent propiska.

If the authorities needed to rule in a certain case, they might refuse a permanent propiska for an individual, but usually not revoking the existing permanent propiska. This also resulted in a situation in which if a spouse agreed, at marriage, to provide the marriage partner with permanent propiska at their apartment, the propiska could not be terminated by divorce, and so exchanging the apartment for two smaller ones was often the only possibility.

=== Sanitary norm ===
Spouses could always provide one another a permanent propiska, but explicit consent was required for this. Children were granted a permanent propiska at one of the parents' permanent propiska locations, and this could not be terminated during the lifetime of the child even as an adult, with the exception of a second criminal sentence, unless the grown-up child voluntarily relocated to another place, and was granted a permanent propiska there.

It was not this easy for any other relatives. For such cases, as also for any unrelated people, the so-called "sanitary norm" was used: a propiska would not be issued if it would cause the apartment area to fall below 12 m^{2} (130 sq ft) per person. The number of rooms in the apartment was important: two persons of different gender, one or both being 9 years or older, were forbidden to share a single room.

If the new "propiska" of the new dweller violated this rule, the propiska would not be granted, with spouses being an exception. This was officially meant to prevent unhealthy overcrowding of apartments and sexual abuse, but since most Soviet people had only a little over 9 m^{2} (97 sq ft) per person, it was also an effective method of migration control.

These norms were very similar to getting onto the governmental (not dependent on particular employer) "housing list", which was yet another Soviet form of mortgage, again with real money replaced by years of working at one's workplace—the queue was free in terms of money. The main difference was that to gain admission to the housing list, the space had to fall below the required 9 m^{2} (97 sq ft) per person in an existing apartment. Due to the dwelling-area rule already mentioned, children of different gender also raised the chances of getting to the queue. This housing list was very slow, much slower than employers' list, and sometimes it took a person's whole life to get an apartment.

As a result, practically the only way for a person legally to improve their living conditions was marriage or childbirth. This was also a serious driving force in migration of young people to "monocities", the new cities built from scratch, often in Siberia or the Arctic, some around a single facility (factory, oil region, or the like).

=== Housing property rights and mortgage: pre/post Soviet ===
In 1993, after the collapse of the Soviet Union in December 1991, propiska was restructured as resident registration, so the modern Russian legislation does not use the terms "propiska" and "propisat", with the exception of situations where a reference is needed for the Soviet period. However, it is still used as a colloquial abbreviation for permanent residency registration.

In the USSR, there had been some so-called "cooperative" apartments, owned on a Western-style mortgage basis, but they were scarce and getting one was very difficult. The three major post-Soviet reforms, to "not show ethnic background" on this still-vital document, private ownership (something previously disallowed), and seemingly free movement, being "able to register to live anywhere, once they arrange a written lease or buy a house" also ended the situation where these were the only apartments which passed down to children by inheritance.

In normal apartments, when the last dweller died, the apartment was returned to the government: when the grandparents became older, they usually preferred to live separately from their children and grandchildren. This was usually connected to cheating of the propiska system: the grandparents were registered not for the apartment in which they lived but the apartment of their children, to avoid the return of their apartment to the government after their death.

Violations of the propiska system within a single city/town were rarely actually punished. Also, Moscow employers were allowed to employ people from the vicinity of Moscow living in a given radius (around 40 km (25 mi)) from Moscow. In theory, it was possible to exchange apartments over mutual agreement between parties. Few people wanted to move from a large city to a smaller one, even with additional money, but the exchange of two flats for one in a larger city was sometimes possible. Apartment exchange with money involved was something of a "gray area" bordering on a criminal offence, and there was a real possibility that the participants would be prosecuted as for an economic crime, and real estate agents arranging such things were strictly outlawed and prosecuted, living in a "gray area" and hiding their activities from the authorities.

Many people used subterfuge to get a Moscow propiska, including marriages of convenience and bribery. Another way of obtaining Moscow residency was to become a limitchik: to enter Moscow to take certain understaffed job positions, such as at cleaning services, according to a certain workforce quota (limit). Such people were provided with a permanent living place, usually a flat or a room in a shared flat, for free, in exchange for working for a certain number of years. Some valuable specialists, such as scientists or engineers, could also be invited by enterprises, which provided them with flats at the expense of the enterprise.

At a certain period, residents of rural areas had their passports stored at selsoviets, officially "for safekeeping", which prevented them from unofficial migration to the areas where they did not have apartments. This was intended to prevent cities from having an influx of migrants who sought higher living standards in large cities but had permanent registration far away from their actual place of residence.

=== Propiska fee in Moscow ===
In the late 1980s and early 1990s, just before the collapse of the USSR, the authorities in Moscow introduced an official charge to be permanently registered in Moscow even in their own property. The fee was around US$5,000, around a quarter of the price of a small apartment at that time. This system lasted several years, causing major public uproar from human rights activists and other liberals, and was abolished after several rulings of the Russian Constitutional Court, the last one in late 1997.

=== Propiska and education ===
Students not of the city in question were provided a temporary propiska in the dormitories of their university campuses. Generally, dormitory space was not provided to students studying in the same city as their parents' residence, but they often wanted it to be free from their parents. After graduation or leaving school early (expulsion, withdrawal, etc.), this temporary propiska was terminated.

In Soviet times, this was connected to a "distribution" system which was a mandatory official allocation of a first job placement for university graduates, even from the same city, where they had to work for around 2 years "to pay back the cost of their education". Only postgraduates were exempted from this requirement.

This system was despised as being a violation of freedom, since nobody wanted to relocate from a larger city to a smaller one, but it still provided at least a propiska (and the dwelling space connected to it) to a graduate. A "young specialist" could nearly never be fired, the same as a pregnant woman and other specific, in terms of labor laws, categories of people who were entitled to such benefits.

After the end of the USSR, the distribution system was almost immediately abolished, leaving graduates with the choice of returning to their home town/village, to their parents or other relatives or struggling to find work in the large city where the school was located. To do the latter, some people became "propiska hunters", i.e. people marrying anybody with permanent propiska in a large city, just to retain their legal right to stay there after graduation. Since, once provided the permanent propiska was not revocable, the natives of the large city were very suspicious about senior-age students from smaller towns or villages when it came to marriage.

== Modern usage ==
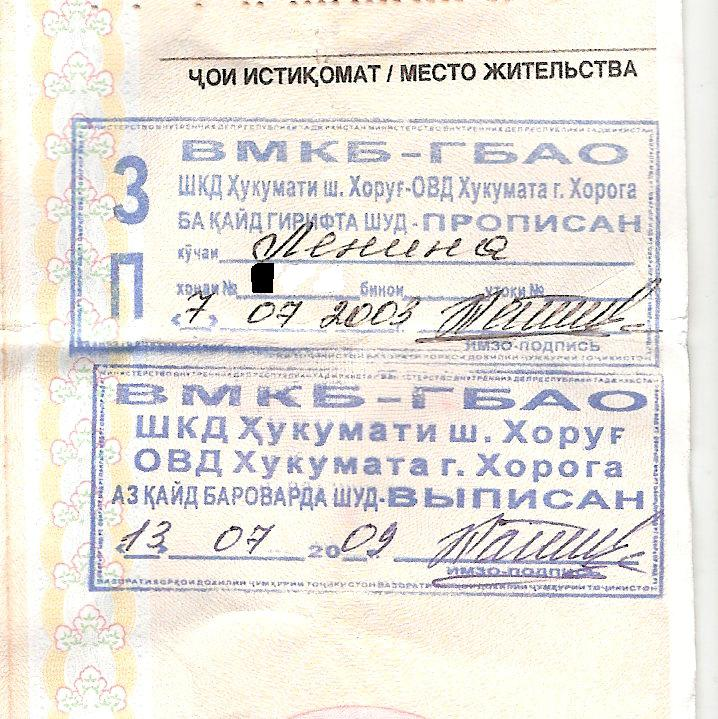
Signing in (top) and signing out (bottom). A propiska in a Tajikistan Passport.

Following the collapse of the Soviet Union, the propiska system was officially abolished. Several former Soviet republics, such as Belarus, Kyrgyzstan, and Russia, chose to keep their propiska systems, or at least a scaled-down version of them.

The Supreme Court of Russia has ruled the propiska to be unconstitutional on several occasions since the fall of communism and it is considered by human rights organizations to be in direct violation of the Russian constitution, which guarantees freedom of movement. Russia changed propiska to registration, though the word propiska is still widely used to refer to it colloquially.

Citizens must register if they live in the same place for 90 days. For Belarusian citizens in Russia and vice versa, it is 30 days. There are two types of registration, permanent and temporary. A place of permanent registration is indicated on a stamp made in an internal passport, and a place of temporary registration is written on a separate paper. Living in a dwelling without a permanent or temporary registration is considered an administrative offence.

Registration is used for economic, law enforcement and other purposes, such as accounting for social benefits, housing and utility payments, taxes, conscription, and medical care.

Today, registration plays little role in questions of property. In Soviet times, for example, if after a marriage, a wife was registered in accommodation her husband rented from the state, in case of divorce, she could obtain some part of her husband's place of residence for her own usage. In modern Russia, this was mostly abandoned due to apartment privatisation, but if a person has no other place to live, he still cannot be evicted without substitution, acting as a powerful deterrent for registering others on their property title.

At the same time, many documents and rights may be obtained only at the place where a citizen has permanent registration, which causes problems, for example, with obtaining or changing passports, voting, obtaining inquiry papers, which are often needed in Russia. Unfortunately, officials tend to ignore laws that allow people to obtain such things and rights if they exist.

For foreigners, registration is called "migration control" and is stamped on a migration card and/or coupon, approximately one third the size of an A4 paper, which must be returned to officials before departure.

Migration control is much stricter than internal registration. For instance, to employ any Russian citizen, even with the permanent registration out of the city in question, the employer needs no special permit; only the employee must be registered.

Employing unregistered people is an administrative offence for the employer, but penalties are rare: sometimes even Western companies in Moscow employ unregistered people (usually university graduates who have lost their dormitory registration due to graduation). The penalty is much stricter in the case of foreigners. To employ foreigners, employers must have a permit from the Federal Migration Service.

Belarusian citizens have the same employment rights as Russian citizens in Russia.

In 2001, the Constitutional Court of Ukraine ruled that propiska was unconstitutional. In 2003, the registration of the place of residence was introduced instead.

In Uzbekistan, even though citizens are issued a single passport, severe restrictions on movement within the country apply, particularly in the capital Tashkent. After the 1999 Tashkent bombings, the former Soviet era restrictions were reimposed, making it virtually impossible to acquire propiska in Tashkent.

== See also ==
- Eastern Bloc emigration and defection
- Passport system in the Soviet Union
- Resident registration in Russia
- Russian passport
- 101st km
- Hukou system
