= Russian citizenship law =

On Citizenship of the Russian Federation О гражданстве Российской Федерации

Federal Assembly
- Citation: N 62-ФЗ
- Enacted by: Federal Assembly
- Signed by: President of Russia
- Signed: 31 May 2002
- Commenced: 1 July 2002
- Status: Amended

Russian citizenship law details the conditions by which a person holds citizenship of Russia. The primary law governing citizenship requirements is the federal law "On Citizenship of the Russian Federation" (Russian: О гражданстве Российской Федерации, O grazhdanstve Rossiyskoy Federacii), which came into force on 1 July 2002.

Any person born in Russia to at least one Russian parent, or born overseas to two Russian parents receives Russian citizenship at birth. Foreign nationals may become citizens by admission after meeting a minimum residence requirement (usually five years), proving a legal source of income, and demonstrating proficiency in the Russian language.

Russia was previously a part of the Soviet Union and its residents were Soviet citizens. Following the dissolution of the Soviet Union, all post-Soviet states established separate citizenship laws. Although citizens of the former Union Republics are no longer Soviet, they continue to be eligible for a facilitated acquisition of Russian citizenship in which they can be exempted from some requirements for admission as Russian citizens.

The completely new citizenship law of 28 April 2023 138-FZ entered into force on 26 October 2023, and at that moment the old law 62-FZ, which had been in force for more than 20 years, ceased to be in force.

== Terminology ==
The distinction between the meaning of the terms citizenship and nationality is not always clear in the English language and differs by country. Generally, nationality refers to a person's legal belonging to a country and is the common term used in international treaties when referring to members of a state; citizenship refers to the set of rights and duties a person has in that country.

The Constitution of Russia provides differing definitions for both terms; citizenship is the status given to an individual indicating the state which exercises jurisdiction over that particular person and nationality refers to a person's ethnic group. Soviet regulations required a person's nationality to be indicated on their internal passport, determined by the nationality of their parents. If their parents' nationalities differed, they could choose either nationality. Russian internal passports since the 1990s have omitted this information completely. In the Russian context, the two terms are not interchangeable and cannot be used as a synonym for the other.

== History ==
=== Romanov Russia ===
Before the concept of citizenship was codified in legislation, inhabitants of the Tsardom of Russia and the Russian Empire personally owed allegiance to the Russian monarch. There were no general requirements for becoming a Russian subject until the 16th century, when it became customary to treat any person who had been christened by the Russian Orthodox Church as having acquired subjecthood. Foreigners who wished to become Russian subjects were required to swear an oath of personal fealty to the Russian monarch beginning with the reign of Peter the Great. The oath used during this time required the subject to pledge themself as an "obedient slave and eternal subject with my family" of the sovereign and remained unchanged until 1796, when the word "slave" was removed.

Provincial governments held wide discretion in determining who could be naturalized as Russian subjects until 10 February 1864, when the imperial government introduced a five-year residence requirement and shifted authority over naturalization from provincial authorities to the Ministry of Internal Affairs of the Russian Empire. The residence requirement could be reduced for individuals who performed an extraordinary service for the Russian state, were especially talented or highly skilled in a scientific field, or made significant investments in the empire. The term "citizenship" became introduced in this reform as a different name for the concept of subjecthood.

Russian women who married foreign men automatically lost Russian subject status. A formerly Russian widow or divorcée who had lost her Russian subject status through marriage could petition a provincial authority for restoration of that status. Other Russian subjects could separately apply for the end of their subjecthood through the Ministry of Internal Affairs with approval from the emperor. Any person who became a foreign subject or citizen without prior government approval could be punished by the deprivation of their rights or banishment to Siberia.

=== Revolutionary Russia and Soviet Union ===
After the October Revolution in 1917, the new Russian Soviet Federative Socialist Republic (RSFSR) government abolished all previous imperial legislation. Prevailing Bolshevik theory at the time considered communism to be an international movement, which became reflected in citizenship regulations in the new state. Under the 1918 Russian constitution, local soviets were empowered to directly grant foreigners Soviet citizenship, particularly intended for those belonging to the peasant and working classes. No specific procedures were required to become a Soviet citizen during this time other than obtaining local authority approval. While this model of citizenship acquisition was quite simple and expeditious, contemporary regulations also allowed for citizenship deprivation at any time at the sole discretion of the central government as a deterrence against "the enemies of Soviet power".

The RSFSR became a founding member of the Soviet Union (USSR) in 1922, and citizenship regulations were restructured under the authority of the All-Union government following adoption of the 1924 Constitution of the Soviet Union. Every person living within the borders of the USSR was a Soviet citizen unless they declared themselves as foreign citizens. Soviet citizens also held citizenship of the Union Republic in which they were permanently resident, although republican citizenship was symbolic and held no substantive meaning. Standard regulations in other countries required wives and children to hold the same citizenship as the male head of the family. Soviet legislation deviated from the contemporary international norm and allowed Soviet women who married foreign men to retain their Soviet citizenship after marriage. Any imperial Russian subjects who had permanently departed Russia before 7 November 1917 and had acquired foreign citizenship or applied for such status were deprived of Russian/Soviet citizenship by decree in 1933.

The first piece of legislation governing solely on the issue of citizenship was the 1938 Soviet Citizenship Law, which provided a redefinition for who held Soviet citizenship. Unlike previous regulations which automatically granted citizenship to virtually all residents of the USSR, this law defined Soviet citizens as anybody who had been a Russian subject at the time of the founding of the RSFSR in 1917 and had not subsequently lost Soviet citizenship, as well as those who had lawfully obtained citizenship. All other people resident in the USSR who neither held Soviet citizenship nor could prove foreign citizenship were treated as stateless persons. Citizenship could be deprived under this law as part of a court decision or by decree of the Presidium of the Supreme Soviet. All Soviet Jews who permanently migrated to Israel were stripped of Soviet citizenship by decree beginning in 1967.

The 1977 Constitution of the Soviet Union established the principle that all Soviet citizens would enjoy protection abroad by the Soviet government. Following its adoption, a new citizenship law was enacted on 1 December 1978 which prohibited the extradition of Soviet citizens to any foreign jurisdiction and formally barred holding multiple citizenships. Citizenship was held to be a unique relationship between a citizen and country, and any deviation from that was considered a violation of loyalty to the state, which led to a potential deprivation of citizenship.

During the reform period of glasnost and perestroika, Soviet citizenship law was revised for a final time in 1990. The modified legislation transferred responsibility for citizenship deprivation from the Presidium of the Supreme Soviet to the president of the Soviet Union and greatly limited the circumstances in which this power would be exercised. Soviet citizenship could now only be deprived from individuals who enlisted in foreign militaries or other governmental bodies, permanently lived abroad and failed to register at a Soviet consulate for at least five years, or had fraudulently acquired citizenship.

=== Russian Federation ===
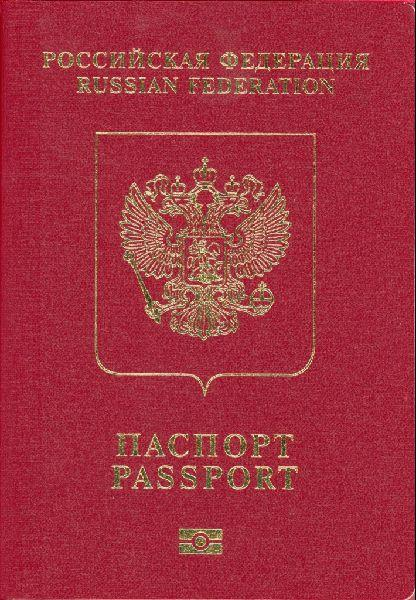
Russian passports are a visible feature of Russian citizenship

In the waning days of the Union, the RSFSR adopted the Declaration of State Sovereignty of the Russian Soviet Federative Socialist Republic, which reemphasized the role of republican citizenship within Soviet citizenship. This declaration restated that every citizen of the RSFSR also held citizenship of the USSR. As part of its preparations for a reformed Soviet Union, the RSFSR drafted new citizenship legislation that brought regulations in line with the Universal Declaration of Human Rights. Under this law, citizenship could no longer be deprived at the sole discretion of the government and holding multiple citizenships ceased to be strictly prohibited, though this was only explicitly allowed in cases where the RSFSR had a bilateral agreement on dual citizenship. This law was adopted on 28 November 1991 but did not come into force until 6 February 1992, after the dissolution of the Soviet Union.

Former Soviet citizens who were permanently resident in Russia on 6 February 1992 automatically became Russian citizens unless they explicitly applied to refuse citizenship by 6 February 1993. Residence was based on a person's officially listed place of domicile in the propiska system. Any other former Soviet citizen could obtain Russian citizenship by registration if they migrated to Russia between 6 February 1992 and 31 December 2000, or before 6 February 1995 if they were resident in a former Union Republic and had not become citizens of that new country. Stateless persons living in Russia or a Union Republic that had remained part of the Soviet Union on 1 September 1991 could register as Russian citizens by 6 February 1993. Spouses, children, and other lineal descendants of Russian citizens were eligible for citizenship by registration without time limit. Children of former Russian citizens who were born after their parents' loss of citizenship had a right to register as Russian citizens within five years of reaching age 18.

==== Dual citizenship arrangements with other former Soviet states ====
As a result of the Soviet Union's collapse, large numbers of ethnic Russians became resident outside the boundaries of the Russian state. In order to give this population and other former Soviet citizens an opportunity to choose the country of their new affiliation, visa-free movement was established throughout the Commonwealth of Independent States (CIS) in 1992. Facilitating this were dual citizenship treaties signed with Turkmenistan in 1993 and Tajikistan in 1996. Simplified naturalization procedures through which applicants of a treaty CIS country could acquire Russian citizenship after three months of their application were separately signed with Kyrgyzstan and Kazakhstan in 1996, as well as a multilateral agreement with Belarus and Kyrgyzstan in 1999. Residents of the breakaway regions of Abkhazia, South Ossetia, and Transnistria were granted Russian citizenship under provisions of the 1991 law accommodating former Soviet citizens. Overseas Russians gained official status as "compatriots" in 1999 in Russian law, which defined them as any persons who lived outside the territory of the Russian Federation who themselves or their ancestors had previously lived in Russia, although this had no practical effect on existing citizenship legislation. However, the Russian government had no wider initiative to resettle overseas Russians during this time and the agreement on CIS-wide free movement expired by 2000. Although there were several attempts at negotiating a dual citizenship arrangement with Ukraine during the 1990s and in 2004, they ultimately ended with no agreement.

Part of Russia's objectives in pursuing dual citizenship agreements with CIS member states in the 1990s was to provide Russians residing in the former Soviet Union with some sense of security from the Russian state so that they would be less likely to resettle in Russia during that period of prolonged economic crisis and restructuring. The other post-Soviet states were wary of Russia's intentions with extending citizenship to people within their borders and did not want to expose themselves to further Russian influence. Despite some support within the State Duma for automatically extending Russian citizenship to all former Soviet citizens, the legislature ultimately rejected this to prevent causing unnecessary friction.

The dual citizenship agreements had been intended to ease the post-Soviet transition for ethnic Russians who found themselves living in foreign countries. However, most of the people utilizing this were not ethnically Russian at all and originated from areas of the CIS that were economically dependent on Russia. Beginning in 2000, facilitated naturalization pathways for former Soviet citizens began to be restricted. The Ministry of Internal Affairs ceased issuing new Russian passports in that year to former Soviet citizens who did not have established propiska in Russia on 6 February 1992. When the law "On Citizenship of the Russian Federation" was enacted in 2002, eligibility for simplified naturalization was limited only to those who had been born on Russian territory and requirements were raised for that process. While virtually any former Soviet citizen could obtain Russian citizenship by simple registration under the 1991 law, the 2002 changes required such individuals to fulfill a language requirement, prove a legal income, and renounce their previous citizenship. They also became required to establish permanent residence in Russia before they could naturalize, even if they previously held propiska. The cumulative effect of these added conditions extended the time in which a former Soviet citizen could acquire Russian citizenship to as long as eight years.

Dual citizenship was actively discouraged by Russian government agencies until after the 2014 annexation of Crimea. Regulations were again relaxed for citizens of some post-Soviet countries beginning in the late 2010s as a way for the Russian state to exert greater influence on neighboring states. Ukrainian citizens seeking to acquire Russian citizenship have not been required to prove renunciation of Ukrainian citizenship since 2017 and residents of Donetsk Oblast and Luhansk Oblast became eligible for expedited acquisition of Russian citizenship in 2019. The five-year residence period for naturalization was later removed for citizens of Belarus, Kazakhstan, Moldova, and Ukraine and the requirement to renounce foreign citizenships to naturalize as Russian was completely abolished in 2020. Following the 2022 Russian invasion of Ukraine, the expedited acquisition process was extended first to Zaporizhzhia Oblast and Kherson Oblast in May 2022, and later to all of Ukraine in July 2022.

==== Eurasian integration ====
Russia and Belarus established the supranational Union State in 1999. Citizens of both countries automatically hold Union State citizenship, which grants eligibility to vote in Union State elections and stand for office in Union State institutions. Russian and Belarusian citizens may reside and work in either country under a freedom of movement for workers established by bilateral agreement, which was later expanded to all member states of the Eurasian Economic Union (EAEU) founded in 2015. These movement rights are tied to a worker's contract of employment in another member state and do not grant automatic permanent residence rights anywhere in the EAEU.

== Acquisition and loss of citizenship ==
Any person born in Russia automatically receives Russian citizenship by birth if at least one parent is a Russian citizen. Individuals born in the country to two foreign parents only receive Russian citizenship by birth if they cannot acquire the citizenship of either parent. Children born overseas to two Russian parents are Russian citizens by descent, while those who are born to one Russian parent only receive Russian citizenship if the other parent provides consent to the child acquiring a Russian citizenship, or if they would otherwise be stateless. Abandoned children found in the country are presumed to have been Russian citizens by birth if their parents cannot be found within six months.

Foreigners may become Russian citizens by admission after residing in the country for more than five years while possessing a residence permit. Individuals without permits who permanently settled in Russia before 1 July 2002 are treated as if they have had a permit since the date on which they registered their place of residence. Applicants must demonstrate proficiency in the Russian language and have a legal source of income. The residence requirement is reduced to one year for individuals who have been granted asylum or refugee status, or who have made extraordinary scientific, technological, or cultural contributions. It may also be waived for citizens of other post-Soviet states who have served in the Russian Armed Forces for at least three years. Additionally, the president of Russia has discretionary authority to directly grant citizenship to any foreigner.

Certain groups of foreign citizens and stateless persons qualify for a facilitated acquisition of Russian citizenship without needing to fulfill a minimum residence requirement. These include: persons with at least one Russian parent who lives within Russia, former Soviet citizens permanently resident in a post-Soviet state but have not acquired citizenship in that country, and citizens of a former Soviet state who have been educated in Russian secondary schools or universities since 1 July 2002. Foreign and stateless individuals already resident in Russia may also be eligible for this simplified process if they are: former Soviet citizens born in the Russian Soviet Federative Socialist Republic, married to a Russian citizen for at least three years, a disabled person with an adult child who is a Russian citizen, a person with a Russian citizen child but a Russian spouse who is deceased or has been declared missing or otherwise unable to hold parental rights, or a person with a Russian citizen child over the age of 18 who has been declared mentally unfit by court order.

Russian citizenship can be relinquished by making a declaration of renunciation. Parents of Russian citizen children may apply for renunciation on their behalf. Dual citizens have been refused requests to renounce their Russian citizenship. In circumstances where the Russian Federation cedes territory to a foreign country, Russians living in affected territory are given a choice between retaining Russian citizenship or acquiring citizenship of the new controlling state.

== See also ==
- Visa policy of Russia
- Visa requirements for Russian citizens
