= Military identity card =

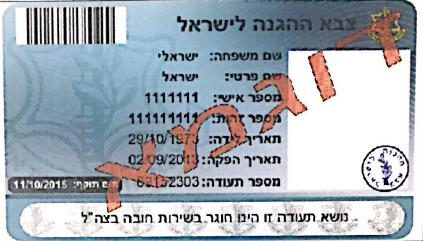
- A military identity card issued by the Israel Defense Forces
- Issued by: Azerbaijan; Belarus; Finland; Israel; Kazakhstan; Poland; Russia; Tajikistan; Ukraine; USA; Greece
- Eligibility: military personnel

A military identity card is an identity document issued to soldiers of the armed forces of various countries.

== Summary ==
=== Details ===
In addition to the general identity information, such as last name, given name(s), date and place of birth, and, education, military ID can contain a number of specific information items, such as:

- Decision of the draft board
- Assigned location and occupation, such as military occupational specialty in the United States Armed Forces.
- Military rank
- Government (departmental) awards and decorations
- Wounds, injuries and contusions
- List of weapons and technical equipment assigned to the person
- Reserve status
- Military training
- Anthropometric measurements (height, head circumference, size of the gas mask, clothing size, shoe size)
- Marks for the admission and withdrawal of the military registration

=== Uses ===
Depending upon the level of access afforded to individual personnel, military ID cards are usually required to be presented to guards in order to receive entry access to military locations, including bases, as well as military-related services and operations.

== Finland ==
There are three kinds of military identity documents. Finland practices conscription (see Conscription in Finland). For leave, conscripts are issued a temporary identity document. When the conscript is discharged, he is issued a military pass (Finnish: sotilaspassi, Swedish: militärpass), which serves as a proof of discharge for the purposes of applying for a Finnish passport. Historically, it was issued as a small (A7 size) cardboard and paper document that resembles a passport, and later as a folded cardboard document in a plastic cover, with handwritten text in both cases. Historical passports included a significant numbers of details about the service. Since 2007, however, it has been issued in credit card size, contains much less detail, and cannot be modified afterwards. Lastly, salaried personnel carry a staff ID (Finnish: puolustusvoimien henkilökortti, Swedish: försvarsmaktens identitetskort), which is also issued to the cadets of the National Defence University.

== Israel ==
In the Israel Defense Forces, two types of military IDs are issued: an ordinary military ID (he:תעודת חוגר), and a combatant's ID (he:תעודת לוחם). Both types of military ID are about the size of a credit card; the ordinary military ID is a smart card that serves as an identifying document, as an access card for the IDF's computer networks and systems, and as a public transport pass used instead of the civilian Rav-Kav (IDF soldiers in uniform are entitled to free public transport).

== Russia ==
In modern Russian military, the ID cards of two different types are issued: ID for a soldier/sailor/sergeant/warrant officer (ru:Военный билет Вооружённых сил России), and ID for a military officer (Russian: Удостоверение личности военнослужащего, ru:Удостоверение личности военнослужащего).

Military identity card of the Russian Armed Forces (Russian: Военный билет Вооружённых сил России) is a document issued to soldiers of the Armed Forces of the Russian Federation and other "power" agencies, where military service is provided, as well as to those who are exempt from military service or upon admission to the reserve. For citizens on the conscription military service, this is a document replacing the passport of a citizen of the Russian Federation.

In addition to the modern version of the document, military cards issued in the Soviet Union are also in use, as well as several options for older military cards issued in the Russian Federation.

== Photo gallery ==
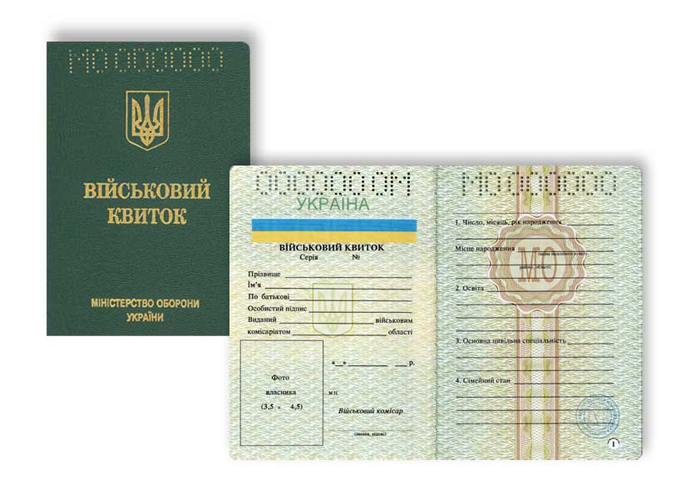

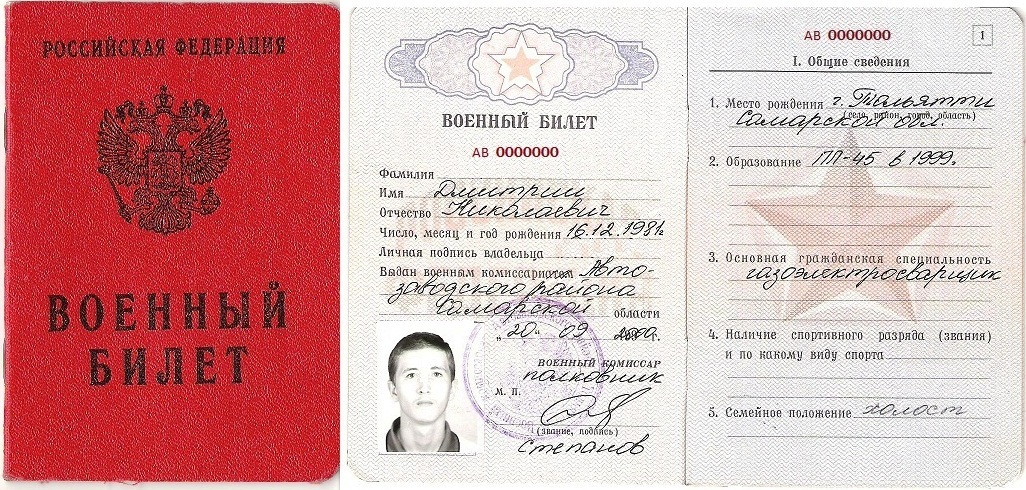

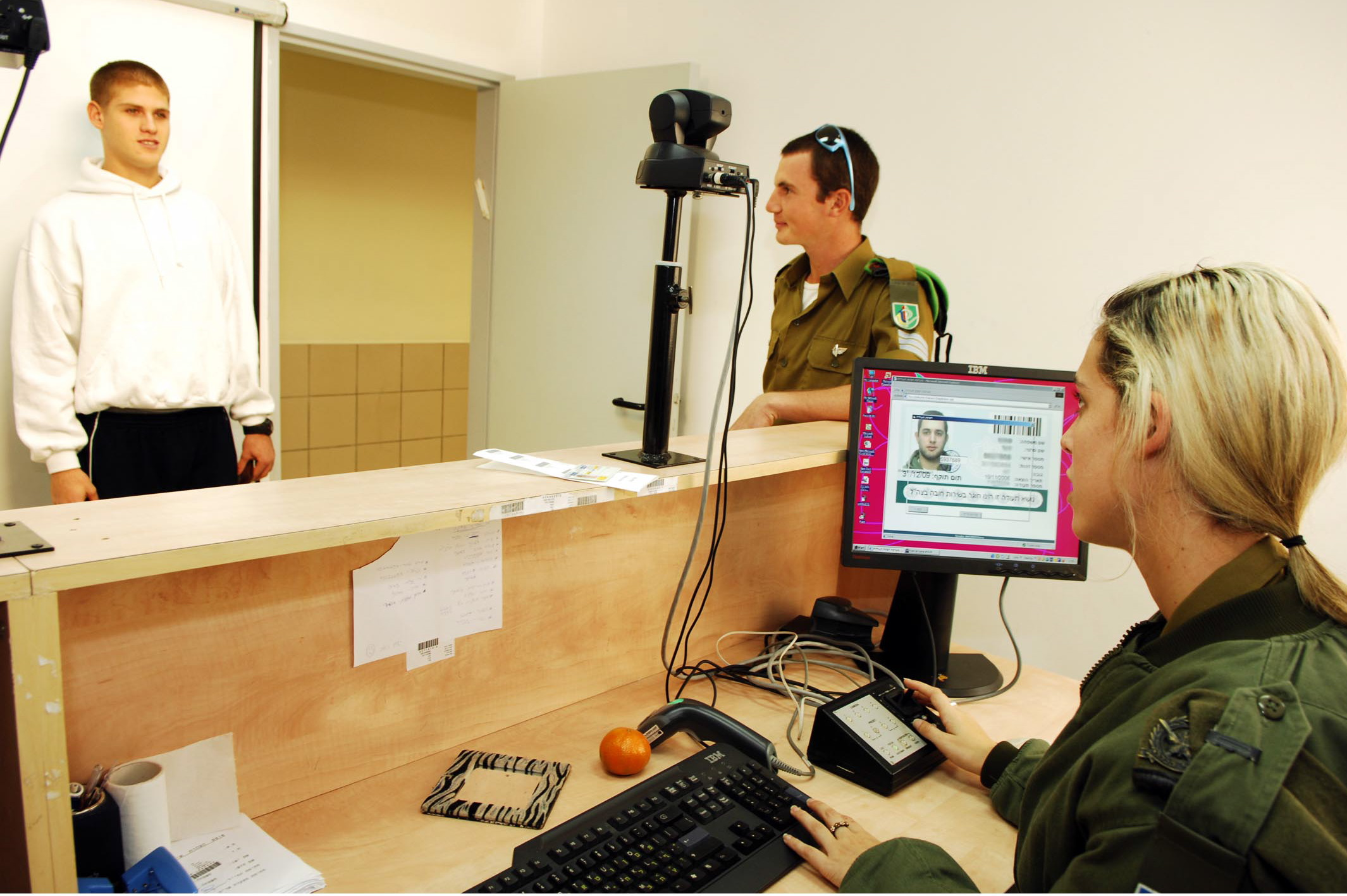

== See also ==
- United States Uniformed Services Privilege and Identification Card
- Common Access Card
- Universal Electronic Card
