= Wolf's ticket =

Document with restrictive clauses

A wolf's ticket (Russian: волчий билет, romanized: volchiy bilet, Polish: wilczy bilet [ˈvil.t͡ʂɘ ˈbi.lɛt]) is a colloquial expression for a document (an ID, a certificate, etc.) with clauses that restricted rights of a person, such his right to work or study in educational institutions. The phrase and such restrictions were used in the Russian Empire and USSR.

== Russia ==
Originally it was a colloquial phrase in Russian Empire to denote a document issued instead of the internal passport to persons who were given a half-year postponement of katorga or exile for settling personal affairs. The phrase "wolf's certificate" or "wolf's passport" referred to a bad document with which it was impossible to be employed. It also referred to a passport marked with a notice about political unreliability.

Later, it denoted a limited certificate for completion of studies. Unlike a regular diploma, it merely stated that the studies were completed, but the student was not allowed to take exams for reasons of poor study or improper behavior. The latter kind of wolf's ticket was a serious impediment to one's career.

Still later this phrase was applied to a document issued in place of an internal passport to persons released from imprisonment ("certificate of release"). Usually this kind of document restricted the rights of a citizen in terms of place of residence (the 101st kilometre rule), occupation, and so on.

== Poland ==
In Poland, "wolf's ticket" (Polish: wilczy bilet) means an informal official negative opinion that prevented a person from traveling abroad, taking up studies or working due to offenses committed by him, usually of a political nature.

== See also ==
- 101st kilometre
- Blacklisting
- Lishenets
- Residential segregation
- Pale of Settlement
