= Passport system in the Soviet Union =

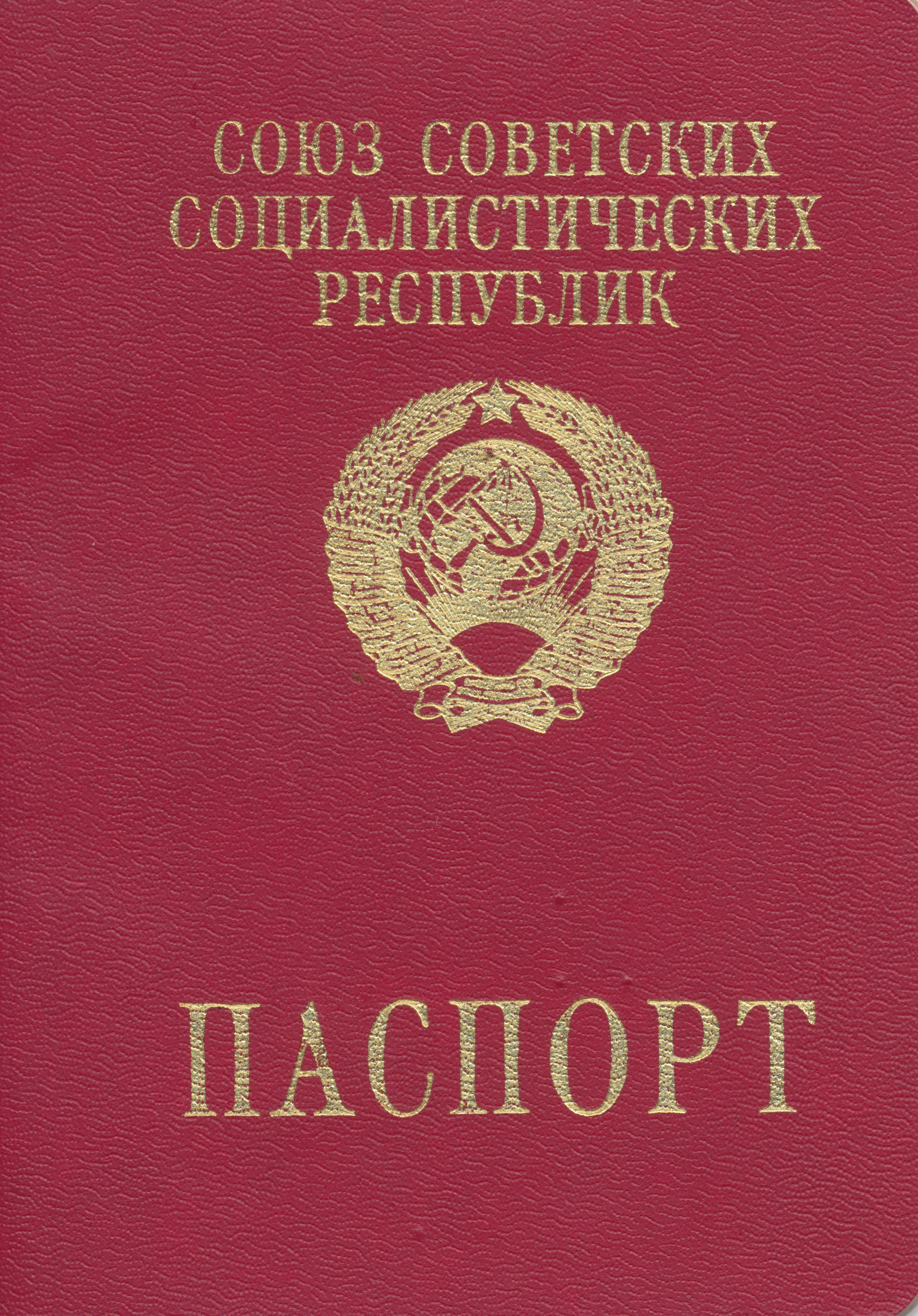
Soviet Union passport for travel abroad

The passport system of the Union of Soviet Socialist Republics was an organisational framework of the single national civil registration system based upon identification documents, and managed in accordance with the laws by ministries and other governmental bodies authorised by the Constitution of the USSR in the sphere of internal affairs.

== 1917–1932 ==
The foundations of the passport system of the Russian Empire, inherited by the Russian Republic in March 1917 for eight months, were thrown into confusion by the October Revolution, which dismantled all the state apparatus, including the police as one of the key elements of this system. An official passport system did not exist in the early RSFSR nor in the USSR (established 29 December 1922). Pre-revolutionary passports continued to be used as identification, but large sections of the adult population had no passports at all: many peasants, soldiers and officers, prisoners, etc.

=== Personal Identification ===
"Metrika" (Russian: метрика), an excerpt from the birth registration books (Russian: Метрическая книга), was a kind of identity document available to everybody.

On 18 December 1917 the Sovnarkom issued the decree which laid the legal and institutional framework for the organisation of registration and statistics of the three major type of life events: birth, marriage/divorce, and death. Once run by the church, all this paperwork was transferred to the state authorities.

As it was before the revolution, the "metriks" records (both in the books and in the excerpts given to the parents) contained such critical identification information as: date and place of birth, name and sex of a child, full names of his parents (if known). By default, a child inherited a surname of his or her father (if known), mother (if single); however both parents were not limited in their choice. Unlike the pre-revolutionary "metriks", civilian documents of new Soviet authorities said nothing of parents' religion. Also, due to the non-clerical status of the birth registration, information about "vospriemniki" (godfather and godmother) also disappeared from this document.

The system originates in the Decree of the VTsIK and RSFSR Sovnarkom About Personal Identity Cards issued on 20 June 1923, which abolished all previously existing travel and residence permit documents (but allowed various documents for personal identification). Urban population had to obtain ID cards at the local militsiya departments; rural residents were serviced by volost ispolkoms (executive governmental offices). The ID cards were valid for three years and could have a photo pasted on. Neither photos nor ID cards were obligatory. The system of residential registration existed, but any personal documents were valid for this purpose and the registration, although known as "propiska" was not associated with the residential permit of the later propiska system.

The Small Soviet Encyclopedia released in May 1930 seems to be the last encyclopedical source which fixed the early post-revolutionary treatment of the passport system as a tool of the so-called "police state" where it provides "police supervision and taxation system". Stating that the whole concept of the "passport system" is unknown to the Soviet system of rights, the author insists that the passport system is also burdensome to the contemporary bourgeois (i.e. non-socialist) states which tend to simplify or even abolish this system.

Soviet passports did not identify gender, although patronymics are gendered. In the early days they recorded "social origin" and "social position". They recorded nationality, which might include what in other contexts would be regarded as ethnicity, such as Jewish or Crimean Tatar. If both parents had the same this was that of the children. If it differed the child could choose which nationality to adopt at the age of 16. Children were normally listed in the passport of their mother. Men's passport might include liability for child support.

== 1933–1991 ==
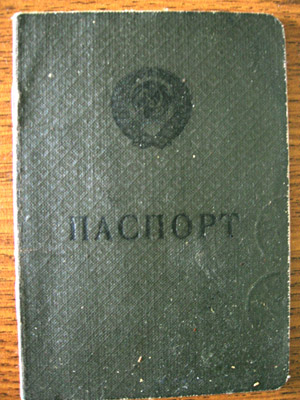
Soviet passport before 1974

On 27 December 1932 the USSR Central Executive Committee and Sovnarkom issued the decree About establishment of the Unified Passport System within the USSR and the Obligatory Propiska of Passports. The declared purposes were the improvement of population bookkeeping in various urban settlements and "the removal of persons not engaged in industrial or other socially-useful work from towns and the cleansing of towns from hiding kulaks, criminals and other antisocial elements".

Passports were introduced for urban residents, sovkhozniks and workers of novostroykas. (Note: A novostroyka (Russian: новостройка) was a major construction-site of a new town, plant, railway station, etc.) According to the 1926 Soviet Census 82% of the population in the Soviet Union lived in rural areas. Kolkhozniks and individual peasants did not have passports and could not move into towns without permission. Permissions were controlled by chairpersons of collective farms or by rural councils. Repeated violations of the passport régime counted as a criminal offence. Passports were issued by the People's Commissariat of Internal Affairs (Soviet law-enforcement) and until the 1970s had a green cover.

The implementation of the passport system was based on the USSR Sovnarkom decree dated April 22, 1933 About the Issue of Passports to the USSR Citizens in the territory of the USSR. The document declared that all citizens at least sixteen years old residing in cities, towns, and urban workers' settlements, as well as those residing within one hundred kilometres (62 miles) of Moscow or Leningrad, within fifty kilometres (31 miles) of Kharkiv, Kyiv, Minsk, Rostov-on-Don, or Vladivostok or within the hundred-kilometre zone along the western border of the USSR were required to have a passport with propiska. Within these areas passports were the only valid personal identification document. From 1937 onwards, all passports had a photo headshot of the bearer. Historian Stephen Kotkin argues that the sealing of the Ukrainian borders (caused by the internal passport system)aimed to prevent the spread of famine-related diseases.

On 10 September 1940 the USSR Sovnarkom decreed the Passport Statute (Russian: Положение о паспортах, romanized: Polozhenye o pasportakh). It enabled special regulations concerning the propiska in the capital cities of the different republics, krais, and oblasts, in state border areas, and at important railroad junctions.

On 21 October 1953 the USSR Council of Ministers decreed a new Passport Statute. It made passports obligatory for all citizens older than sixteen years in all non-rural settlements. Rural residents could not leave their place of residence for more than thirty days, and even for this leave a permit from a selsoviet was required. The notion of "temporary propiska" was introduced, in addition to the regular or "permanent" one. A temporary propiska was issued for work-related reasons and for study away from home.

After the First Congress of Collective Farm Workers in the summer of 1969, the Council of Ministers of the USSR relieved rural residents from procedural difficulties in obtaining a Soviet passport.

On 28 August 1974 the USSR Council of Ministers issued a new Statute of the Passport System in the USSR and new rules of propiska. The latter rules remained in effect until 23 October 1995. However "blanket passportisation" started only in 1976 and had finished by 1981.

== See also ==
- Soviet passport
- Russian passport
- Internal Passport of Russia
- Propiska in the Soviet Union
