= 101st kilometre =

Russian colloquial phrase

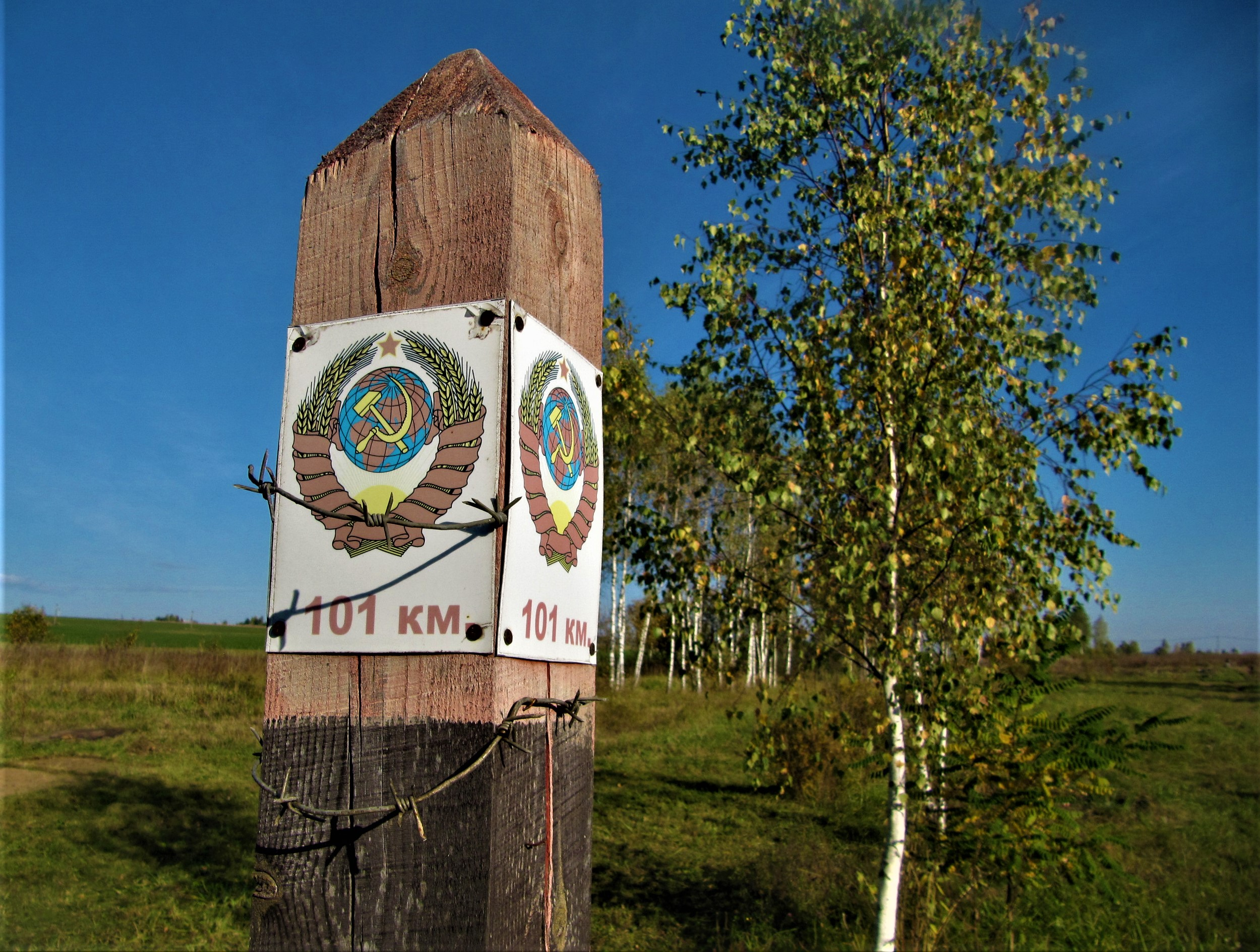
A memorial sign denoting a 101 km distance

The 101st kilometre (Russian: 101-й километр, romanized: sto pervyy kilometr) is a colloquial phrase for restrictions on freedom of movement in the Soviet Union.

== Practice ==
The 101st kilometre became a colloquial phrase for limits on freedom of movement under propiska, the Soviet system of controlling internal migration. During most of the Soviet era, criminals and other "undesirables" including the ones released from the Gulags were often restricted from settling in larger urban centers such as Moscow. The propiska laws were intended in part to keep undesirable elements away from foreigners, who were usually restricted to areas within 25 km (16 miles) of city centers, in a similar fashion to the 1980 Summer Olympics.

The rights of an ex-inmate to move freely about the country after release from a prison would be restricted for a long period of time. Instead of regular documents, former inmates would receive a temporary substitute, a "wolf's ticket" (Russian: волчий билет, romanized: volchiy bilet), confining them to exile without the right to settle closer than 100 km (62 mi) to large urban centres where they would be refused the residency permit under the propiska system.

In post-Stalin Soviet Union a notable purge of undesirables beyond the 101st km was in preparations to the 1980 Summer Olympics as an effort of the authorities to improve the image of Moscow in the eyes of foreigners.

In modern Russia, this 100 km restriction has been abolished — although a residential registration is required.

== See also ==
- Lishenets
- Residential segregation
- Kármán line – another 100 km boundary; the "Boundary of Space".
