= Universal electronic card =

Russian digital identity card

Universal electronic card Универсальная электронная карта
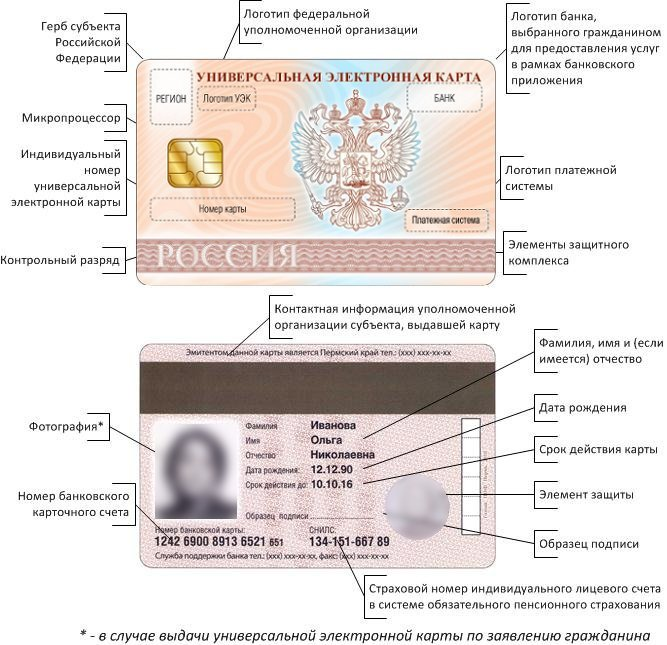
- An example of the universal electronic card
- Issued by: Russia
- Eligibility: 16 years of age legal permanent residence status (including non-citizens)
- Expiration: 5 years

Universal electronic card (UEC) (Russian: универсальная электронная карта) was an identity E-card that was issued to Russian citizens from January 2013 to December 2016. The UEC allowed remote order, pay and receive government services, replaces a number of documents, including medical insurance policies and pension insurance certificate, bringing together different services on a single card including electronic purse, debit card, electronic signature, the ticket and other possibilities. The project was abandoned on 1 January 2017 and the card electronic signatures were revoked in April 2017.

== History ==
The Federal Law No. 210-FZ of July 27, 2010 "On the organization of public and municipal services", which defines the universal electronic card, the objectives of its creation and application areas.

In February 2011, Russian President Dmitry Medvedev chaired a meeting of the "Commission for Modernization and Technological Development of Russia", advocating the unification of electronic card issuance and the provision of public services to the population as one of the most important items of the meeting. However, Russian companies did not have the capacity to manufacture the microprocessors needed for the cards at that time, but had to order from foreign microprocessor production companies, which the FSB considered dangerous. It was a political decision temporarily, in 2012, a microprocessor foreign production.

In October 2011, Russian president Dmitry Medvedev signed a presidential decree on the application of the national emblem on the universal electronic card. They also found that there were difficulties in the implementation of the electronic systems of interdepartmental cooperation, the term of which is transferred to start mid-2012. And without starting the system to issue a map is meaningless. The term of issue of the universal electronic card rescheduled for January 1, 2013. Also in October 2011, it was decided to use only the Russian UEC payment system PRO100, excluding the participation of international payment systems Visa and MasterCard. And in the Savings Bank promised to "neutralize lobbyists international payment systems in the bodies of the Russian government".

Since February 2012, in nine pilot regions of Russia: Moscow, St. Petersburg, the Astrakhan region, the Republic of Bashkortostan, the Volgograd Oblast, Novosibirsk Oblast, Penza Oblast, Krasnodar Krai and Tatarstan started issuing cards to participants of the project, in order to verify it works in practice.

On 16 February 2012, there was published "How to use UEC", which set out the anecdotal evidence of the pin-code, which is possible only unfulfilled plans of developers: "If citizens are forced to enter a PIN code, then provided false PINs, the introduction of which will buy time and to provide prompt assistance to a citizen from the power structures".

In September 2012 it was reported that the technologies used and tested in the UEC will be used in an electronic passport, which is scheduled to release in a few years.

In November 2012, on the official website of "UEC" was launched availability monitoring of Russian regions for the launch of the project. Willingness implies a destination charge of UEC in the region, providing secure channels of communication, providing access to regional public services by UEC, the establishment of call centers, etc. The monitoring data is updated once a week.

In December 2012, there was an order that all multi-function centers, providing state and municipal services should be equipped with card readers for universal electronic cards.

In January 2013, the certification of microprocessors for universal electronic cards from the Russian company "Mikron" was completed. Also, in some universal electronic card with a microprocessor foreign production, presented by JSC "Atlas of cards". This is done to during the competition between the two companies to reduce cost of production of UEC. Map started to give the citizens of Russia on the application, which can be fed into the open across Russia points for receiving applications and issuing cards. President of "UEC" Alex Popov said that the card uses an electronic signature CryptoPro.

In February 2013, it was announced that some regions of the Russian Federation does not have enough money to ensure the production and issuance of cards. Sberbank has decided to be part of the shareholders authorized regional organizations, enabling them to finance the work of, and to create a unified regional processing centers and billing, who will take over as the expenditure part of the issuance of all of UEC, and as the revenue side will be engaged in accrual payments for utilities across the region and will be transport operators.

In the spring 2013, issue of regional social cards stopped. Instead, citizens there would be given the universal electronic cards.

In the late spring of 2013, it was planned to open a portal for citizens' identification and payment of public services. Citizens would be able to register on the portal with the help of UEC, using a card reader.

In December 2016 the Federal Law No. 471-FZ of December 28, 2016 defined the project cancellation.

== Details ==
On the reverse side of the card identification data of the citizen is printed: name, surname, given name(s), sex, date of birth, holder's signature, photograph, credit card number and expiration date, and identifiers of the mandatory pension insurance system – SNILS and compulsory health insurance system – insurance policy OMC.

Stored on the chip is card identification data indicated on the reverse side of the card, reinforced by an electronic signature, data transport application on tickets purchased and the remaining trips. Other details about the citizens are still stored in the databases of public institutions, and the UEC only helps to search for matching records about the holder when handling them to the appropriate agency using the secure channel communications system of inter-agency electronic interaction.

== Security and safety ==
Developers of UEC claim to use the data without holder's consent is not possible. To use the card requires a PIN, which the citizen must for security to keep away from the card and kept secret from everyone. In the private office citizen can install additional security and limit the use of the service. If the card is lost it can be locked in a private office or by calling the hotline. This information is automatically registered with the government services that provide e-services and take advantage of a lost card will be impossible.

In paragraphs accepting applications documents are not left on the table at once sent to the safe. Video surveillance. After receiving the application information is sent over secure communication channels to Moscow. After producing the card delivery service of special communication sent in a separate envelope with the PIN codes and separately sends universal electronic cards – they are only on the points of issue.

Reading the information from the card terminal can only be certified of UEC. Blanks for UEC are made at two plants to join the single payment-service system "Universal Electronic Card": a state of "Goznak" and ZAO "First Printing House". Unlike bank cards, universal electronic card are made of laser-sensitive polycarbonate which has a high resistance to wear. There are other security measures that are applied to the card. Application of personal information is laser engraved in the regional centers of the universal electronic card personalization. As the laser engraving process the photographic image and the text are not on the card surface, and the film screen, to replace the photo or text document without damaging it is impossible. At UEC card installed microprocessor, a certified Russian Federal Security Service in accordance with the requirements of information security. Software that is installed on the stage of connecting electronic signature is certified by Federal Security Service and performs all of the most stringent requirements for information security. Selected for the UEC cryptographic algorithms and plans to study their safety were found to correspond to the highest standards of information security at the Fifteenth International Conference "RusKripto'2013" on 30 March 2013.
