= Visa requirements for Moldovan citizens =

Administrative entry restrictions

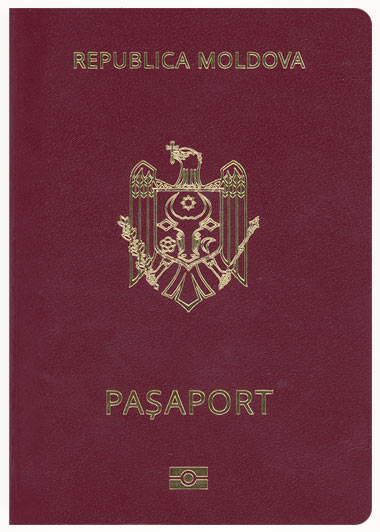
A Moldovan passport

Visa requirements for Moldovan citizens are administrative entry restrictions imposed on citizens of Moldova by the authorities of other states.

As of 2026, Moldovan citizens had visa-free or visa on arrival access to 120 countries and territories, ranking the Moldovan passport 48th in the world according to the Henley Passport Index.

On 28 April 2014, Moldovan citizens were granted visa-free entry to 29 Schengen Area countries as well as Cyprus, countries that are applying the Schengen policy and also Monaco, San Marino, Andorra, Vatican City and Gibraltar, countries that have no immigration control. Visa waiver applies only to holders of biometric passports.

Moldovan citizens in other countries also can benefit from the mobility rights arrangements within the Commonwealth of Independent States.

== Visa requirements map ==
Visa requirements for Moldovan citizens holding ordinary passports Moldova Unlimited Visa not required Visa issued upon arrival eVisa Visa available both on arrival or online Visa required

== Visa requirements ==
Country	Visa requirement	Allowed stay	Notes (excluding departure fees)
Afghanistan	eVisa	30 days	Visa is not required in case born in Afghanistan or can proof that one of their parents is a national of Afghanistan or born in Afghanistan.; e-Visa : Visitors must arrive at Kabul International (KBL).
Albania	Visa not required	90 days	90 days within any 180-day period.
Algeria	Visa required		
Andorra	Visa not required	90 days	
Angola	eVisa		
Antigua and Barbuda	Visa not required	180 days	
Argentina	Visa required		The AVE (High Speed Travel) is open to Moldovan citizens holding valid, current ordinary passports traveling to Argentina for tourism. To do so, they must hold a valid category B2/J/B1/O/P (P1-P2-P3)/E/H-1B visa issued by the United States of America.
Armenia	Visa not required	180 days	180 days in a year.
Australia	Online Visa		May apply online (Online Visitor e600 visa).
Austria	Visa not required	90 days	90 days within any 180-day period in the Schengen Area. (Note: Holders of biometric passports only.)
Azerbaijan	Visa not required	90 days	If staying more than 10 days passengers visiting relatives must register with local police. If staying in a hotel, this will be arranged by the hotel.; The Government of Azerbaijan prohibits entry to persons of Armenian origin.
The Bahamas	Visa not required	3 months	
Bahrain	eVisa / Visa on arrival	14 days	Visa may be issued on arrival for a stay up to 1 month.; Visa may be extended for an additional 2 weeks.; e-Visa issued for 14 days with the possibility of a one-time extension.
Bangladesh	Visa on arrival	30 days	Extension of stay is possible for an additional 30 days.
Barbados	Visa not required	28 days	
Belarus	Visa not required	90 days	90 days within a calendar year.
Belgium	Visa not required	90 days	90 days within any 180-day period in the Schengen Area.
Belize	Visa required		Visa not required for visits not exceeding 30 days for those holding a valid multiple-entry visa or Permanent Residence Card of US, Canada or holding a valid multiple-entry Schengen visa.
Benin	eVisa	30 days	Must have an international vaccination certificate.; Three types of electronic visa are offered: the e-Visa valid for 30 days for a single entry (50 EUR), the e-Visa valid for 30 days for several (multiple) entries (75 EUR), and the e-Visa valid for 90 days to make several (multiple) entries (100 EUR).
Bhutan	eVisa		The Sustainable Development Fee (SDF) of 200 USD per person, per night for almost all visitors to Bhutan. Additionally, if payment is made in US dollars from September 1, 2023 to August 31, 2027, the SDF is 100 USD.
Bolivia	Visa required		
Bosnia and Herzegovina	Visa not required	90 days	90 days within any 180-day period.
Botswana	eVisa	3 months	
Brazil	Visa not required	90 days	Extension of stay is possible.
Brunei	Visa required		
Bulgaria	Visa not required	90 days	90 days within any 180-day period in the Schengen Area.
Burkina Faso	eVisa		
Burundi	Visa on arrival	1 month	
Cambodia	eVisa / Visa on arrival	30 days	
Cameroon	eVisa		
Canada	Visa required		
Cape Verde	Visa on arrival (EASE)	30 days	Must register online (EASE) at least 5 days prior to arrival.
Central African Republic	Visa required		
Chad	eVisa	90 days	
Chile	Visa not required	90 days	Extension of stay is possible for an additional 90 days for a fee.
China	Visa required		Visa not required for 30 days for travelling as part of an accredited tour group.
Colombia	Visa not required	90 days	Extension of stay is possible for up to 180 days within a calendar year.
Comoros	Visa on arrival	45 days	
Republic of the Congo	Visa required		
Democratic Republic of the Congo	eVisa	7 days	
Costa Rica	Visa required		
Côte d'Ivoire	eVisa	3 months	e-Visa holders must arrive via Port Bouet Airport.
Croatia	Visa not required	90 days	90 days within any 180-day period in the Schengen Area.
Cuba	eVisa	90 days	Extension of stay is possible for another 90 days for a fee.
Cyprus	Visa not required	90 days	90 days within any 180-day period.
Czech Republic	Visa not required	90 days	90 days within any 180-day period in the Schengen Area.
Denmark	Visa not required	90 days	90 days within any 180-day period in the Schengen Area.
Djibouti	eVisa / Visa on arrival	30 days	
Dominica	Visa not required	21 days	
Dominican Republic	Visa required		
Ecuador	Visa not required	90 days	Extension of stay is possible.
Egypt	eVisa / Visa on arrival	30 days	Extension of stay is possible.; Tourists arriving at Sharm El Sheikh, Saint Catherine or Taba airports and remaining in the Sinai resorts do not require a visa for up to 15 days.
El Salvador	Special Entry Permit		
Equatorial Guinea	eVisa		e-Visa holders must arrive via Malabo International Airport.
Eritrea	Visa required		
Estonia	Visa not required	90 days	90 days within any 180-day period in the Schengen Area.
Eswatini	Visa required		
Ethiopia	eVisa	90 days	e-Visa holders must arrive via Addis Ababa Bole International Airport.
Fiji	Visa not required	4 months	
Finland	Visa not required	90 days	90 days within any 180-day period in the Schengen Area.
France	Visa not required	90 days	90 days within any 180-day period in the Schengen Area.
Gabon	eVisa		e-Visa holders must arrive via Libreville International Airport.
Gambia	Visa required		Citizens of Moldova travelling on charter flights and as part of tour groups may enter without a visa.
Georgia	Visa not required	365 days	
Germany	Visa not required	90 days	90 days within any 180-day period in the Schengen Area.
Ghana	eVisa	90 days	
Greece	Visa not required	90 days	90 days within any 180-day period in the Schengen Area.
Grenada	Visa on arrival	3 months	
Guatemala	Visa required		
Guinea	eVisa	90 days	
Guinea-Bissau	Visa on arrival		
Guyana	eVisa		An eVisa(Approval letter) can only be obtained after contacting the Department of Immigration and Citizenship by phone.; Payment is done upon arrival.
Haiti	Visa not required	3 months	
Honduras	Visa required		
Hungary	Visa not required	90 days	90 days within any 180-day period in the Schengen Area.
Iceland	Visa not required	90 days	90 days within any 180-day period in the Schengen Area.
India	eVisa	30 days	e-Visa holders must arrive via 32 designated airports (Note: Ahmedabad; Amritsar; Bagdogra; Bengaluru; Bhubaneswar; Chandigarh; Chennai; Coimbatore; Delhi; Gaya; Goa-Dabolim; Goa-Manohar; Guwahati; Hyderabad; Indore; Jaipur; Kannur; Kochi; Kolkata; Kozhikode; Lucknow; Madurai; Mangaluru; Mumbai; Nagpur; Port Blair; Pune; Surat; Thiruvananthapuram; Tiruchirappalli; Varanasi; Visakhapatnam) or 5 designated seaports. (Note: Chennai; Cochin; Mormugao (Goa); Mumbai; Mangalore); An Indian e-Tourist Visa may only be obtained twice within 1 calendar year.; Foreigners of Pakistani origin or who hold a Pakistani Passport are not eligible for an e-Visa. Foreigners who are not Pakistani nationals, but whose parents or grandparents (either paternal or maternal) were born in, or were permanent residents in Pakistan, are also not eligible for an e-Visa.
Indonesia	eVisa	30 days	
Iran	eVisa	30 days	Citizens of Moldova who have already made an application, at least two days before arrival, at the Iranian Ministry of Foreign Affair's e-Visa website and present the submission notification at the airport's visa desk may obtain a visa on arrival.; Admission will be refused: to women not wearing Islamic head cover, scarf, long sleeves or stockings.; to holders of passports containing an Israeli visa/stamp in the last 12 months.; 14 day visa-free on Kish and Qeshm Islands.; Extension of stay is possible twice for 30 days for a total of up to 90 days.
Iraq	eVisa		Holders of passports containing an Israeli stamp or visa will be refused entry in Iraq.
Ireland	Visa required		
Israel	Electronic Travel Authorization	90 days	Biometric passport holders only. ETA-IL required.
Italy	Visa not required	90 days	90 days within any 180-day period in the Schengen Area.
Jamaica	Visa on arrival		
Japan	Visa required		
Jordan	eVisa / Visa on arrival	30 days	Visa may be obtained on arrival, it will cost a total of 40 JOD, obtainable at most international ports of entry and land border crossings. (except King Hussein/Allenby Bridge).; Extension of stay is possible for up to 60 days.
Kazakhstan	Visa not required	90 days	
Kenya	Electronic Travel Authorisation	90 days	Applications can be submitted up to 90 days prior to travel and must be submitted at least 3 days in advance.; eTA fee is 32.50 USD.; Proof of reservation at the hotel where visitors plan to stay is required (if staying with friends, an invitation letter is also acceptable).; Yellow fever vaccination certificate is required if coming from endemic countries.; Can also be entered on an East Africa Tourist Visa issued by Kenya or Rwanda.
Kiribati	Visa required		
North Korea	Visa required		
South Korea	Visa required		Visa not required for 30 days on Jeju Island.
Kuwait	Visa required		
Kyrgyzstan	Visa not required	60 days	60 days within any 120-day period.
Laos	eVisa / Visa on arrival	30 days	18 (Note: Savannakhet Airport; Lanetoui - Mengkang (China); Meuangmom - Wan Pong (Myanmar); Banvang - Ban Khok Phai (Thailand); Namngeun - Huay Kon (Thailand); Paksan - Bueng Kan (Thailand); Paktaphan - Pak Saeng (Thailand); Pangmon - Ban Huak (Thailand); Phoudou (Thailand); Dak ta ock - Nam Giang (Vietnam); La Lai (Vietnam); Namkan (Vietnam); Namphao - Cau Treo (Vietnam); Namsoy - Na Meo (Vietnam); Naphao - Cha Lo (Vietnam); Pahang - Long Sap (Vietnam); Panghok - Tây Trang (Vietnam); Phoukeua - Bo Y (Vietnam)) of the 33 border crossings are only open to regular visa holders.; e-Visa may be used to enter Laos through the Luang Prabang, Pakse and Vientiane international airports, 3 Thai-Lao Friendship Bridges (Note: Vientiane (Friendship Bridge 1); Savannakhet (Friendship Bridge 2); Bokeo (Friendship Bridge 4)), in Boten (road and railroad), and in Vientiane (at Khamsavath railway station).; Visa on arrival is available at the Luang Prabang, Pakse and Vientiane international airports, 4 Thai-Lao Friendship Bridges (Note: Vientiane (Friendship Bridge 1); Savannakhet (Friendship Bridge 2); Khammouane (Friendship Bridge 3); Bokeo (Friendship Bridge 4)) and 7 border crossings. (Note: Nongnokkheane - Trapeang Kriel (Cambodia); Boten - Bo han (China); Golden Triangle/Samliemkham (Thailand); Khamsavath railway station (Thailand); Namheuang - Ban Na Kraseng (Thailand); Vang tao - Chongmek (Thailand); Dansavan - Lao Bảo (Vietnam))
Latvia	Visa not required	90 days	90 days within any 180-day period in the Schengen Area.
Lebanon	Free visa on arrival	1 month	Extension of stay is possible for an additional 2 months.; Holders of passports containing an Israeli stamp or visa will be refused entry in Lebanon.
Lesotho	Visa required		Pre-arranged visa may be picked up on arrival.
Liberia	e-VOA		May apply online and obtain a visa on arrival.; Visa on Arrival (VoA) can only be obtained at Roberts International Airport in Monrovia.
Libya	eVisa		Independent travel is not permitted, and visitors must organize their visit through a tour guide. A tourist police escort is required at all times.; An eVisa will not be granted without a sponsor or tour agency.; A security letter issued by the Libyan Immigration Authorities may also be required.; Holders of passports containing an Israeli stamp or visa will be refused entry in Libya.
Liechtenstein	Visa not required	90 days	90 days within any 180-day period in the Schengen Area.
Lithuania	Visa not required	90 days	90 days within any 180-day period in the Schengen Area.
Luxembourg	Visa not required	90 days	90 days within any 180-day period in the Schengen Area.
Madagascar	eVisa / Visa on arrival	60 days	
Malawi	eVisa / Visa on arrival	90 days	
Malaysia	Visa not required	30 days	The electronic Malaysia Digital Arrival Card must be submitted within three days before the date of arrival in Malaysia.
Maldives	Free visa on arrival	30 days	
Mali	Visa required		
Malta	Visa not required	90 days	90 days within any 180-day period in the Schengen Area.
Marshall Islands	Visa required		
Mauritania	eVisa	30 days	Available at Nouakchott–Oumtounsy International Airport.
Mauritius	Visa on arrival	60 days	
Mexico	Visa required		
Micronesia	Visa not required	30 days	
Monaco	Visa not required	90 days	90 days within any 180-day period.
Mongolia	eVisa	30 days	
Montenegro	Visa not required	90 days	90 days within any 180-day period.
Morocco	Visa required		Citizens of Moldova may obtain an eVisa if they have a valid visa or permanent residency document issued by one of the following countries: any Schengen Area country, Australia, Canada, Ireland, Japan, New Zealand, the United Arab Emirates, the United Kingdom or the United States.
Mozambique	eVisa / Visa on arrival	30 days	
Myanmar	Visa required		
Namibia	eVisa / Visa on arrival	90 days	May be obtained online or on arrival for a fee of N$1,600 (approximately €82 / US$88).
Nauru	Visa required		
Nepal	Online Visa / Visa on arrival	90 days	
Netherlands	Visa not required	90 days	90 days within any 180-day period in the Schengen Area.
New Zealand	Online Visa		May apply online (Online Visitor visa).
Nicaragua	Visa not required	90 days	Extension of stay is possible for a fee of USD 2 per additional day.
Niger	Visa required		
Nigeria	eVisa	30 days	
North Macedonia	Visa not required	90 days	90 days within any 180-day period.
Norway	Visa not required	90 days	90 days within any 180-day period in the Schengen Area.
Oman	Visa not required eVisa	14 days / 30 days	
Pakistan	Online Visa	90 days	Online Visa eligible.; Issued in 7-10 business days.
Palau	Visa on arrival	30 days	Extension of stay is possible twice for 30 days for a fee.
Panama	Visa not required	90 days	
Papua New Guinea	eVisa	60 days	Visitors may apply for a visa online under the "Tourist - Own Itinerary" category.
Paraguay	Visa required		
Peru	Visa not required	90 days	Extension of stay is possible for an additional 90 days, with a maximum stay of 180 days within any 365-day period.; For tourist purposes only.
Philippines	eVisa		Citizens of Moldova must select "Romania" in order to apply for an e-Visa if they are permanently residing in Moldova, while those permanently residing abroad may apply for an e-Visa only if they reside in an eligible country where a Philippine Foreign Service Post is located.
Poland	Visa not required	90 days	90 days within any 180-day period in the Schengen Area.
Portugal	Visa not required	90 days	90 days within any 180-day period in the Schengen Area.
Qatar	eVisa / Free visa on arrival	30 days	Extension of stay is possible for an additional 30 days.
Romania	Visa not required	90 days	90 days within any 180-day period in the Schengen Area.
Russia	Visa not required	90 days	90 days within a calendar year.
Rwanda	Visa not required	30 days	Can also be entered on an East Africa Tourist Visa issued by Kenya or Rwanda.
Saint Kitts and Nevis	Electronic Travel Authorisation	90 days	
Saint Lucia	Visa required		Cruise ship passengers visiting for 1 day are exempted from obtaining a visa.
Saint Vincent and the Grenadines	Visa not required	3 months	
Samoa	Entry permit on arrival	90 days	
San Marino	Visa not required	90 days	90 days within any 180-day period.
São Tomé and Príncipe	eVisa		
Saudi Arabia	Visa required		
Senegal	Visa required		
Serbia	Visa not required	90 days	90 days within any 180-day period.
Seychelles	Electronic Border System	3 months	Application can be submitted up to 30 days before travel.; Visitors must upload a reservation confirmation(s) for each visitor's location of stay in Seychelles.; Yellow fever vaccination certificate is required if coming from endemic countries.; Payment of the fee (EUR 10) by credit or debit card.; Valid for one journey only and it expires once exit the country.
Sierra Leone	eVisa	3 months	
Singapore	eVisa		May obtain the online e-Service through eligible through authorized travel agencies or through local sponsors (Singapore citizen or permanent residents).; Visa-free transit for 96 hours.
Slovakia	Visa not required	90 days	90 days within any 180-day period in the Schengen Area.
Slovenia	Visa not required	90 days	90 days within any 180-day period in the Schengen Area.
Solomon Islands	eVisa	3 months	
Somalia	eVisa	30 days	All visitors must have an approved Electronic Visa (eTAS) before the start of their journey.
South Africa	Electronic Travel Authorization	90 days	ETA must be obtained online in advance via the Department of Home Affairs portal; processing is expected within 24 hours.; The authorisation can be used for entry within 180 days of issuance for tourism or private visits.; Entry with an ETA is possible only through O. R. Tambo International Airport, Cape Town International Airport, Lanseria International Airport and King Shaka International Airport.
South Sudan	eVisa		Obtainable online.; Printed visa authorization must be presented at the time of travel.
Spain	Visa not required	90 days	90 days within any 180-day period in the Schengen Area
Sri Lanka	Electronic Travel Authorization	30 days	Sri Lanka introduced an ETA valid for 30 days.
Sudan	Visa required		
Suriname	Visa not required	90 days	An entrance fee of USD 50 or EUR 50 must be paid online prior to arrival.; Multiple entry e-Visa is also available.
Sweden	Visa not required	90 days	90 days within any 180-day period in the Schengen Area.
Switzerland	Visa not required	90 days	90 days within any 180-day period in the Schengen Area.
Syria	Visa on arrival	15 days	Visa approval (security clearance) is mandatory for those flying directly to Syria.; e-Visa website is not working.; Holders of passports containing an Israeli stamp or visa will be refused entry in Syria.
Tajikistan	Visa not required	90 days	90 days within any 180-day period.
Tanzania	eVisa / Visa on arrival	90 days	
Thailand	eVisa	30 days	
Timor-Leste	Visa on arrival	30 days	
Togo	eVisa	15 days	
Tonga	Visa required		
Trinidad and Tobago	eVisa		
Tunisia	Visa not required	90 days	
Turkey	Visa not required	90 days	ID card valid; 90 days within any 180-day period.
Turkmenistan	Visa required		
Tuvalu	Visa on arrival	1 month	
Uganda	eVisa	3 months	Can also be entered on an East Africa Tourist Visa issued by Kenya or Rwanda.
Ukraine	Visa not required	90 days	ID-card valid for people living within 30 km (19 mi) border zone.; 90 days within any 180-day period.
United Arab Emirates	Visa not required	90 days	90 days within any 180-day period.
United Kingdom	eVisa		
United States	Visa required		
Uruguay	Visa required		
Uzbekistan	Visa not required	Unlimited	
Vanuatu	eVisa		
Vatican City	Visa not required	90 days	90 days within any 180-day period.
Venezuela	eVisa		Introduction of Electronic Visa System for Tourist and Business Travelers.
Vietnam	eVisa	90 days	e-Visa is valid for 90 days and multiple entry.; Visa not required for 30 days on Phú Quốc Island.
Yemen	Visa required		Separately, Yemen introduced an e-Visa system for visitors who meet certain eligibility requirements (group travel of 10 or more people, business trips, and transit etc.).; Holders of passports containing an Israeli stamp or visa will be refused entry in Yemen.
Zambia	Visa not required	30 days	30 days within any 12-month period for business trips.; 90 days within any 12-month period for tourist trips.; Also eligible for a universal visa allowing access to Zimbabwe.
Zimbabwe	eVisa / Visa on arrival	30 days	

== Territories and disputed areas ==
Visa requirements for Moldovan citizens for visits to various territories, disputed areas, partially recognized countries and restricted zones:

Visitor to	Visa requirement	Notes (excluding departure fees)
Europe
Abkhazia	Prior entry permit	Citizens of Moldova may enter Abkhazia without a visa for a period not exceeding 24 hours as part of an organized tourist group.
Mount Athos	Special permit required	Special permit required (4 days: 25 euro for Orthodox visitors, 35 euro for non-Orthodox visitors, 18 euro for students). There is a visitors' quota: maximum 100 Orthodox and 10 non-Orthodox per day and women are not allowed.
Northern Cyprus	Free visa on arrival	
(United Nations) UN Buffer Zone in Cyprus	Access Permit required	Access Permit is required for travelling inside the zone, except Civil Use Areas.
Faroe Islands	Visa not required	90 days
Gibraltar	Visa not required	90 days within any 180-day period.
Guernsey	Visa required	
Isle of Man	Visa required	
(Norway) Jan Mayen	Permit required	Permit issued by the local police required for staying for less than 24 hours and permit issued by the Norwegian police for staying for more than 24 hours.
Jersey	Visa required	
Kosovo	Visa required	
Russia	Special authorization required	Several closed cities and regions in Russia require special authorization.
South Ossetia	Prior Entry required	Need to receive approval from the South Ossetian government in advance of visit.
Africa
British Indian Ocean Territory	Special permit required	Special permit required.
Eritrea outside Asmara	Travel permit required	To travel in the rest of the country, a Travel Permit for Foreigners is required (20 Eritrean nakfa).
Mayotte	Visa not required	90 days within any 180-day period.
Réunion	Visa not required	90 days within any 180-day period.
Ascension Island	eVisa	
Saint Helena	eVisa	
Tristan da Cunha	Permission required	Permission to land required for 15/30 pounds sterling (yacht/ship passenger) for Tristan da Cunha Island or 20 pounds sterling for Gough Island, Inaccessible Island or Nightingale Islands.
Sahrawi Arab Democratic Republic		Undefined visa regime in the Western Sahara controlled territory.
Somaliland	Visa on arrival	30 days for 30 USD, payable on arrival.
Sudan	Travel permit required	All foreigners traveling more than 25 kilometers outside of Khartoum must obtain a travel permit.
(Sudan) Darfur	Travel permit required	Separate travel permit is required.
Asia
Hong Kong	eVisa	
India PAP/RAP	PAP/RAP required	Protected Area Permit (PAP) required for whole states of Nagaland and Sikkim and parts of states Manipur, Arunachal Pradesh, Uttaranchal, Jammu and Kashmir, Rajasthan, Himachal Pradesh. Restricted Area Permit (RAP) required for all of Andaman and Nicobar Islands and parts of Sikkim. Some of these requirements are occasionally lifted for a year.
Kazakhstan	Special permission required	Special permission required for the town of Baikonur and surrounding areas in Kyzylorda Oblast, and the town of Gvardeyskiy near Almaty.
(Iran) Kish Island	Visa not required	Visitors to Kish Island do not require a visa.
Macau	Visa not required	90 days
Maldives	Permission required	With the exception of the capital Malé, tourists are generally prohibited from visiting non-resort islands without the express permission of the Government of Maldives.
North Korea outside Pyongyang	Special permit required	People are not allowed to leave the capital city, tourists can only leave the capital with a governmental tourist guide (no independent moving)
Palestine	Visa not required	Arrival by sea to Gaza Strip not allowed.
Taiwan	Visa required	
(Tajikistan) Gorno-Badakhshan Autonomous Province	OIVR permit required	OIVR permit required (15+5 Tajikistani Somoni) and another special permit (free of charge) is required for Lake Sarez.
(China) Tibet Autonomous Region	TTP required	Tibet Travel Permit required (10 USD).
Turkmenistan	Special permit required	A special permit, issued prior to arrival by Ministry of Foreign Affairs, is required if visiting the following places: Atamurat, Cheleken, Dashoguz, Serakhs and Serhetabat.
(United Nations) Korean Demilitarized Zone	Restricted zone.	
(United Nations) UNDOF Zone and Ghajar	Restricted zone.	
Yemen	Special permission required	Special permission needed for travel outside Sanaa or Aden.
Caribbean and North Atlantic
Anguilla	Visa required	
Aruba	Visa not required	30 days Extension is possible for up to 180 days per calendar year.
Bermuda	Visa required	
(Netherlands) Bonaire, St. Eustatius and Saba	Visa not required	90 days within any 180-day period.
British Virgin Islands	Visa required	
Cayman Islands	Visa required	
Curacao	Visa not required	30 days, but no more than 90 days within any 365-day period.
(France) French Guiana	Visa not required	90 days within any 180-day period.
(France) French West Indies	Visa not required	French West Indies refers to Martinique, Guadeloupe, Saint Martin and Saint Barthélemy.
Greenland	Visa not required	90 days
Montserrat	eVisa	
Puerto Rico	Visa required	
Saint Pierre and Miquelon	Visa not required	90 days within any 180-day period.
Sint Maarten	Visa not required	90 days within any 180-day period.
Turks and Caicos Islands	Visa required	
U.S. Virgin Islands	Visa required	
Oceania
American Samoa	Entry permit required	
(Australia) Ashmore and Cartier Islands	Special authorisation required	Special authorisation required.
Cook Islands	Visa not required	31 days; Each extension is possible for an additional period of 31 days, with a maximum limit of 6 months.
(Fiji) Lau Province	Special permission required	Special permission required.
French Polynesia	Visa not required	90 days within any 180-day period.
Guam	Visa required	
New Caledonia	Visa not required	90 days within any 180-day period.
Niue	Visa required	
Northern Mariana Islands	Visa required	
Pitcairn Islands	Visa not required	14 days and landing fee US$35 or tax of US$5 if not going ashore.
Tokelau	Entry permit required	
United States Minor Outlying Islands	Special permits required	Special permits required for Baker Island, Howland Island, Jarvis Island, Johnston Atoll, Kingman Reef, Midway Atoll, Palmyra Atoll and Wake Island.
Wallis and Futuna	Visa required	90 days within any 180-day period.
South Atlantic
Falkland Islands	Visa required	
South Georgia and the South Sandwich Islands	Permit required	Pre-arrival permit from the Commissioner required (72 hours/1 month for 110/160 pounds sterling).
Antarctica		Special permits required for British Antarctic Territory, French Southern and Antarctic Lands, Argentine Antarctica, (Australia) Australian Antarctic Territory, (Antártica Chilena Province) Chilean Antarctic Territory, (Australia) Heard Island and McDonald Islands, (Norway) Peter I Island, (Norway) Queen Maud Land, (New Zealand) Ross Dependency.

== Non-visa restrictions ==
Moldovan passports are recognized by all countries of the world. However, in some rare cases, Moldovan citizens may be refused entry.

=== Blank passport pages ===
Many countries require a minimum number of blank pages to be available in the passport being presented, typically one or two pages. Endorsement pages, which often appear after the visa pages, are not counted as being valid or available.

=== Vaccination ===
Cover of the new International Certificate of Vaccination issued by the Bureau of Quarantine in the Philippines since 2021

The African countries of Angola, Benin, Burkina Faso, Burundi, Cameroon, Central African Republic, Democratic Republic of the Congo, Republic of the Congo, Côte d'Ivoire, Gabon, Ghana, Guinea-Bissau, Mali, Niger, Sierra Leone and Togo, South Sudan and Uganda, along with French Guiana in South America, require all incoming passengers older than nine months to one year, to have a current International Certificate of Vaccination or Prophylaxis.

Some other countries require vaccination only if the passenger is coming from an infected area or has visited one recently or has transited for 12 hours in those countries: Algeria, Botswana, Cabo Verde, Chad, Djibouti, Egypt, Eswatini, Ethiopia, Gambia, Ghana, Guinea, Lesotho, Libya, Equatorial Guinea, Eritrea, Madagascar, Malawi, Mauritania, Mauritius, Mozambique, Namibia, Nigeria, Papua New Guinea, Seychelles, Somalia, South Africa, Sudan, Tunisia, Uganda, Tanzania, Zambia and Zimbabwe.

=== Passport validity length ===
Very few countries, such as Paraguay, just require a valid passport on arrival.

However many countries and groupings now require only an identity card – especially from their neighbours. Other countries may have special bilateral arrangements that depart from the generality of their passport validity length policies to shorten the period of passport validity required for each other's citizens or even accept passports that have already expired (but not been cancelled).

Some countries, such as Japan, Ireland and the United Kingdom, require a passport valid throughout the period of the intended stay.

In the absence of specific bilateral agreements, countries requiring passports to be valid for at least 6 more months on arrival include Afghanistan, Algeria, Anguilla, Bahrain, Bhutan, Botswana, British Virgin Islands, Brunei, Cambodia, Cameroon, Cape Verde, Cayman Islands, Central African Republic, Chad, Comoros, Costa Rica, Côte d'Ivoire, Curaçao, Ecuador, Egypt, El Salvador, Equatorial Guinea, Fiji, Gabon, Guinea Bissau, Guyana, Haiti, India, Indonesia, Iran, Iraq, Israel, Jordan, Kenya, Kiribati, Kuwait, Laos, Madagascar, Malaysia, Marshall Islands, Mongolia, Myanmar, Namibia, Nepal, Nicaragua, Nigeria, Oman, Palau, Papua New Guinea, Peru, Philippines, Qatar, Rwanda, Samoa, Saudi Arabia, Singapore, Solomon Islands, Somalia, Sri Lanka, Sudan, Suriname, Tanzania, Thailand, Timor-Leste, Tokelau, Tonga, Turkey, Tuvalu, Uganda, United Arab Emirates, Vanuatu, Venezuela, and Vietnam.

Countries requiring passports valid for at least 4 months on arrival include Micronesia and Zambia.

Countries requiring passports with a validity of at least 3 months beyond the date of intended departure include Azerbaijan, Bosnia and Herzegovina, Honduras, Montenegro, Nauru, Moldova and New Zealand. Similarly, the EEA countries of Iceland, Liechtenstein, Norway, all European Union countries (except Ireland) together with Switzerland also require 3 months validity beyond the date of the bearer's intended departure unless the bearer is an EEA or Swiss national.

Countries requiring passports valid for at least 3 months on arrival include Albania, North Macedonia, Panama, and Senegal.

Bermuda requires passports to be valid for at least 45 days upon entry.

Countries that require a passport validity of at least one month beyond the date of intended departure include Eritrea, Hong Kong, Lebanon, Macau, the Maldives and South Africa.

==== Maximum passport age ====
Countries of the Schengen area require non-EU passports to be less than 10 years old upon entry.

=== Criminal record ===
Some countries, including Australia, Canada, Fiji, New Zealand and the United States, routinely deny entry to non-citizens who have a criminal record, while others impose restrictions depending on the type of conviction and the length of the sentence.

=== Persona non grata ===
The government of a country can declare a diplomat persona non grata, banning them from entering the country or expelling them if they have already entered. In non-diplomatic use, the authorities of a country may also declare a foreigner persona non grata permanently or temporarily, usually because of unlawful activity.

=== Israeli stamps ===
Kuwait, Lebanon, Libya, and Yemen do not allow entry to people with passport stamps from Israel or whose passports have either a used or an unused Israeli visa, or where there is evidence of previous travel to Israel such as entry or exit stamps from neighbouring border posts in transit countries such as Jordan and Egypt.

To circumvent this Arab League boycott of Israel, the Israeli immigration services have now mostly ceased to stamp foreign nationals' passports on either entry to or exit from Israel (unless the entry is for some work-related purposes). Since 15 January 2013, Israel no longer stamps foreign passports at Ben Gurion Airport. Passports are still (as of 22 June 2017) stamped at Erez when passing into and out of Gaza.

Iran refuses admission to holders of passports containing an Israeli visa or stamp that is less than 12 months old.

=== Biometrics ===
Several countries mandate that all travellers, or all foreign travellers, be fingerprinted on arrival and will refuse admission to or even arrest travellers who refuse to comply. In some countries, such as the United States, this may apply even to transit passengers who merely wish to change planes rather than go landside.

Fingerprinting countries/regions include Afghanistan, Argentina, Brunei, Cambodia, China, Ethiopia, Ghana, Guinea, India, Japan, Kenya (both fingerprints and a photo are taken), Malaysia upon entry and departure, Mongolia, Saudi Arabia, the Schengen Area, Singapore, South Korea, Taiwan, Thailand, Uganda, the United Arab Emirates and the United States.

Many countries also require a photo be taken of people entering the country. The United States, which does not fully implement exit control formalities at its land frontiers (although long mandated by its own legislation), intends to implement facial recognition for passengers departing from international airports to identify people who overstay their visa.

Together with fingerprint and face recognition, iris scanning is one of three biometric identification technologies internationally standardised since 2006 by the International Civil Aviation Organization (ICAO) for use in e-passports and the United Arab Emirates conducts iris scanning on visitors who need to apply for a visa. The United States Department of Homeland Security has announced plans to greatly increase the biometric data it collects at US borders. In 2018, Singapore began trials of iris scanning at three land and maritime immigration checkpoints.

== Fingerprinting ==
Several countries including Argentina, Cambodia, Japan, Malaysia, Saudi Arabia, South Korea and the United States demand all passengers to be fingerprinted on arrival.

== See also ==
- Visa policy of Moldova
- Moldovan passport
