= Moldovan identity card =

National identity card of Moldova

Moldovan identity card (Carte de identitate)
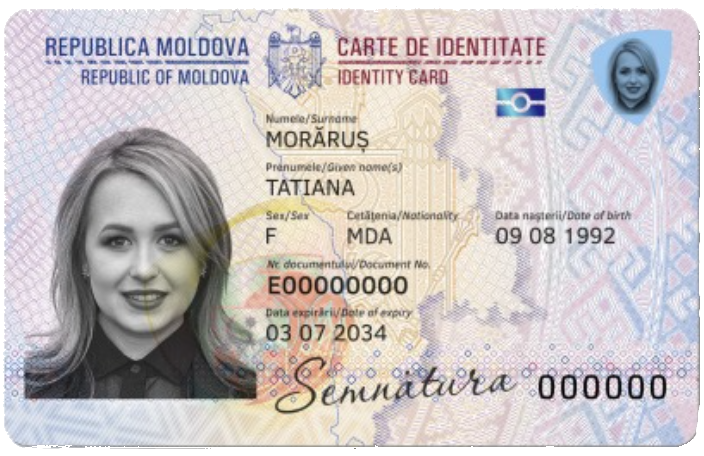
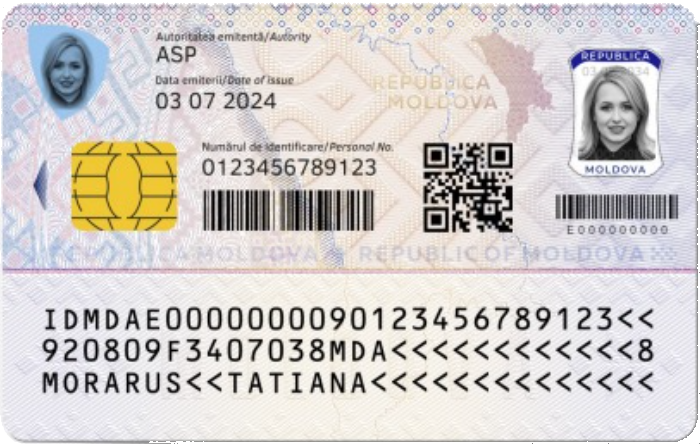
- 2025 series
- Type: Mandatory identity document
- Issued by: Moldova
- First issued: 1996
- Purpose: Identification, travel
- Valid in: Moldova Transnistria; Turkey; Ukraine (local border traffic permit)
- Eligibility: Moldovan citizenship (mandatory)
- Expiration: 10 years (age 14 or over); 7 years (age 7–14); 4 years (age 0–7)

The Moldovan identity card (Romanian: carte de identitate (officially); buletin de identitate (commonly)) is a compulsory identity document issued in the Republic of Moldova. Every Moldovan citizen who resides in the Republic of Moldova must have an ID card. Moldovan ID cards are issued by the Public Services Agency. The following are required to have an ID card: from birth until 10 years of age (the card can be issued without bearers photo), from 10 years of age until 16, from 16 years of age until 25, and from 25 years of age until 45. After 45 years of age, the ID card is not required to be renewed.

== 1996 Series ==
The card is hard plastic and rectangular in shape, 105 × 74 mm (4¼" x 3") in size. On the front side of the card on the left side a color photograph of the bearer is placed along with a round hologram and a signature of the bearer. Top of the card bears a title REPUBLICA MOLDOVA – BULETIN DE IDENTITATE (Republic of Moldova – Identity Card) and country code MDA. On the bottom of the card the Identity Card's Number is placed. The front side has the following description fields:

- Surname
- Name
- Date of birth
- Sex
- Place of birth
- Holder's blood type
- Holder's height
- Holder's eye colour
- Date of issuance
- Issuer's ID
- Date of expiry

On the verso side of the card bears similar identity information with exception of the photo and the information is written in both English and Russian languages. The verso side also contains barcode and other Machine-readable data. The verso side has the following description fields:

- Nationality
- Personal Code
- Surname
- Name
- Patronym
- Place of birth
- Date of birth
- Sex
- Date of expiry

In addition to plastic ID card a soft paper booklet is issued with the card, bearing information on residency, civil and military status. The paper booklet is also used when voting.

== 2013 Series ==
Compared to the 1996 Series, the 2013 Series ID card is smaller in size and is 86.5 x 54 mm (3½" x 2¼"). On the front side of the card on the left side a color photograph of the bearer is placed along with a round hologram and a signature of the bearer. Top of the card bears a title REPUBLICA MOLDOVA – BULETIN DE IDENTITATE (Republic of Moldova - Identity Card), to the left side of the title there is a Moldovan Coat of Arms and to the right side of the title the Identity Card's Number is placed. The front side has the following description fields:

- Surname
- Name
- Citizenship
- Sex
- Date of birth
- Date of issuance
- Date of expiry
- Issuer's ID

The verso side contains barcode and other Machine-readable data. The verso side has the following description fields:

- Personal Code
- Holder's blood type
- Place of residence
- Date of registration in the place of residence

In addition to plastic ID card a soft paper booklet is issued with the card bearing information on temporary residence (e.g. for students). The paper booklet is also used when voting.

Information on both front and verso sides of the card is written in both Romanian and Russian languages.

== 2015 Series ==
Effective 1 September 2015, a new edition of identity cards was introduced. New cards have a slightly different design and are made of polycarbonate. The bearer's photograph is now in black-and-white format only. The new technology involves the use of laser equipment for imprinting data onto the internal layer of the card. This system is based on the use of the next generation materials and equipment, in compliance with European Union directives on document safety. New identity cards are being issued in both Electronic (C series) and Non-electronic (B series) version.

As with previous series, in addition to plastic ID card, a soft paper booklet is issued with the card bearing information on temporary residence (e.g. for students). The paper booklet is also used when voting.
Information on both front and verso sides of the card is written in both Romanian and Russian languages.

== 2019 Series ==
Effective as of 1 April 2020, the only change in this series relative to the 2015 one is the removal of holders blood type from the back side of the ID card. The card also features for the first time a NFC ICAO-compliant biometric chip and logo which stores the bearer's details electronically.

== Fees ==
Moldovan citizens up to 16 years of age inclusive can receive ID card without any fees. All other citizens must acquire ID card for a minimum cost of 130 Moldovan lei for a non-electronic version (B series) and 700 Moldovan lei for an electronic version (C series).

== International travel ==
Currently Moldovan citizens can only travel outside of Moldova within 30 km (19 mi) of the border with Ukraine, Transnistria, and Turkey using their ID cards instead of their passports.

== Gallery ==
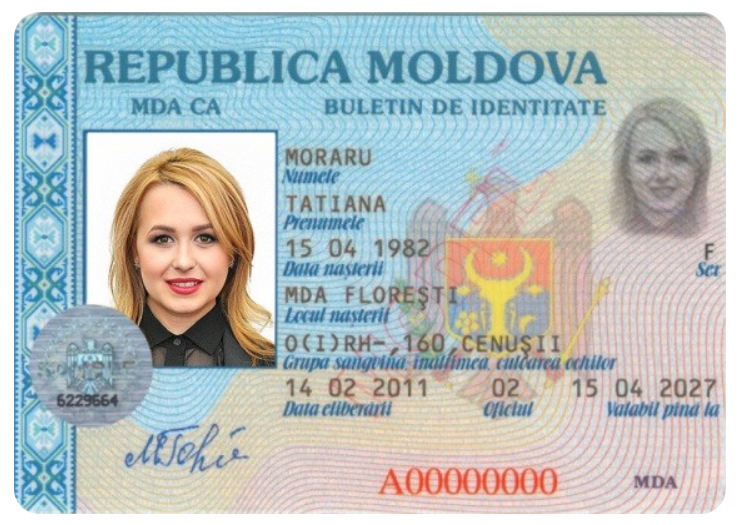
Front side (1996 series)

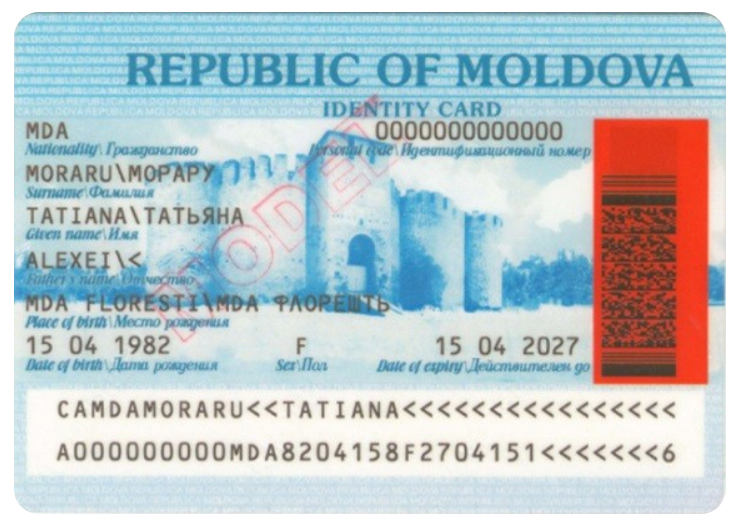
Back side (1996 series)

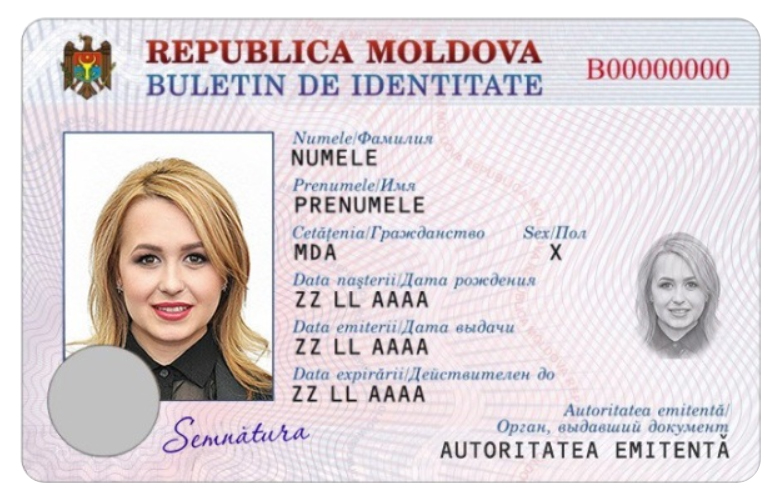
Front side (2013 series)

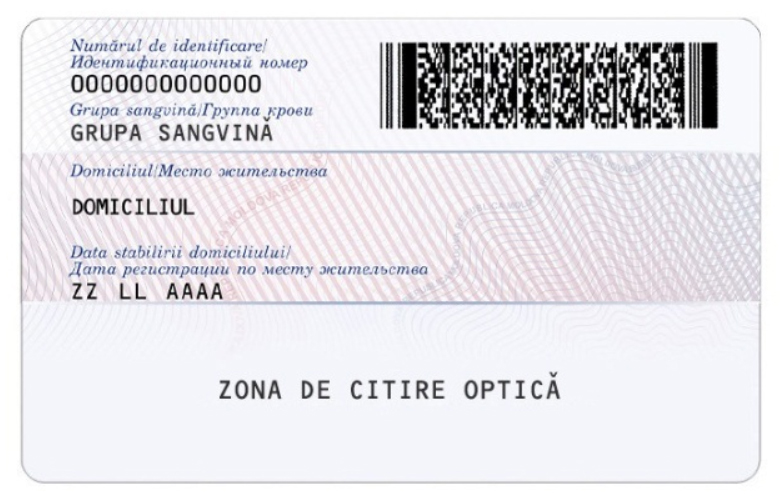
Back side (2013 series)

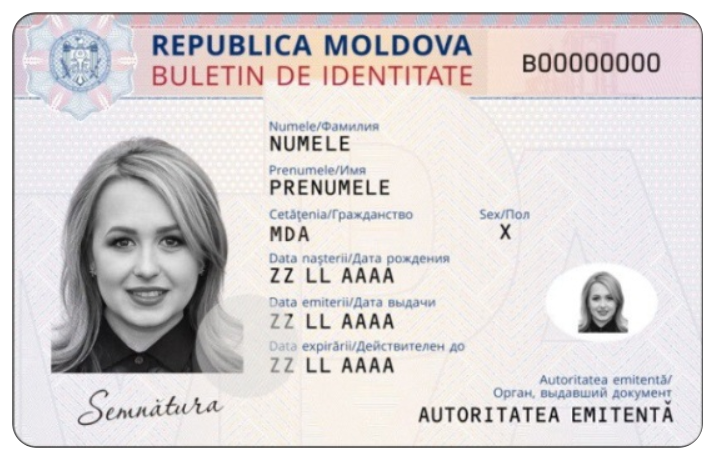
Front side (2015 series)

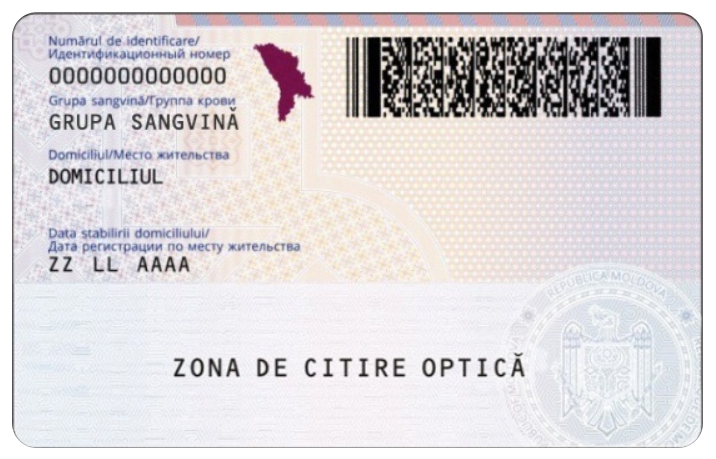
Back side (2015 series)

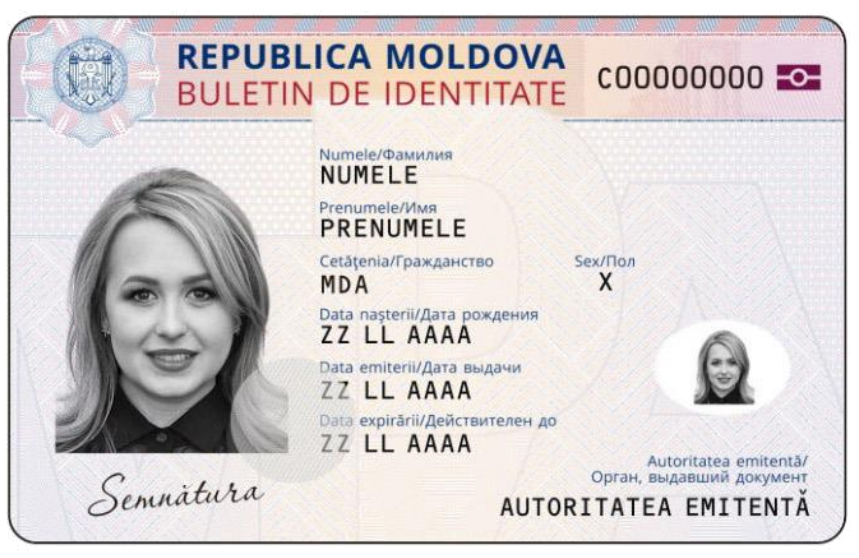
Front side (2019 series)

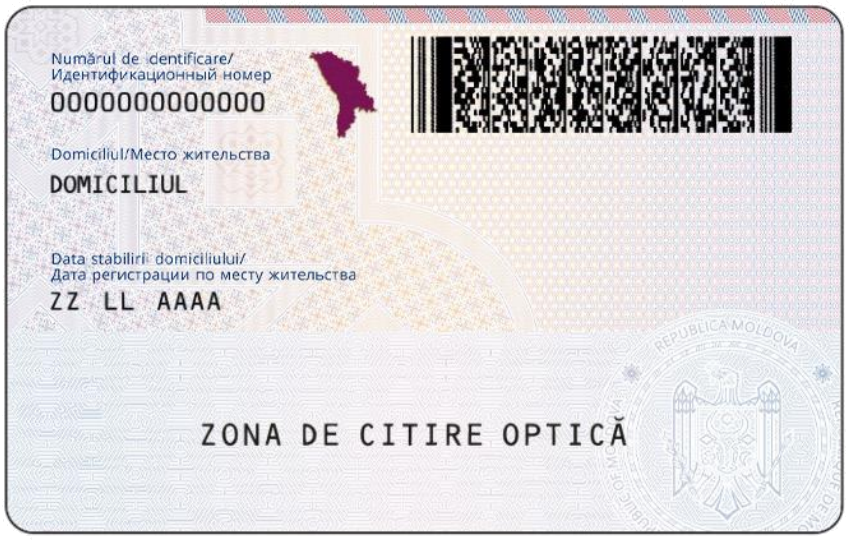
Back side (2019 series)

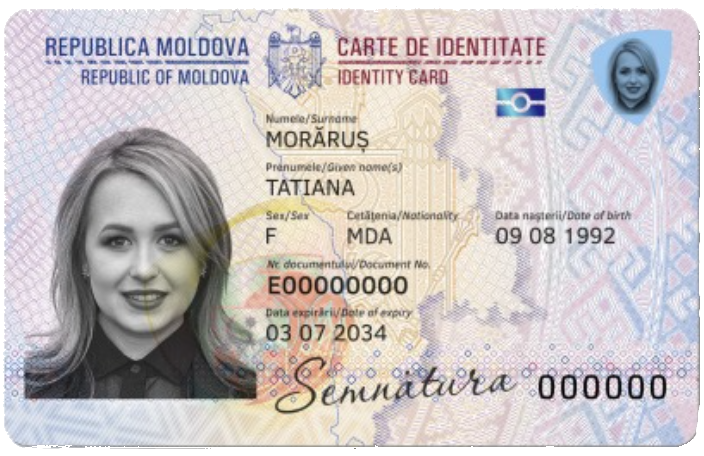
Front side (2025 series)

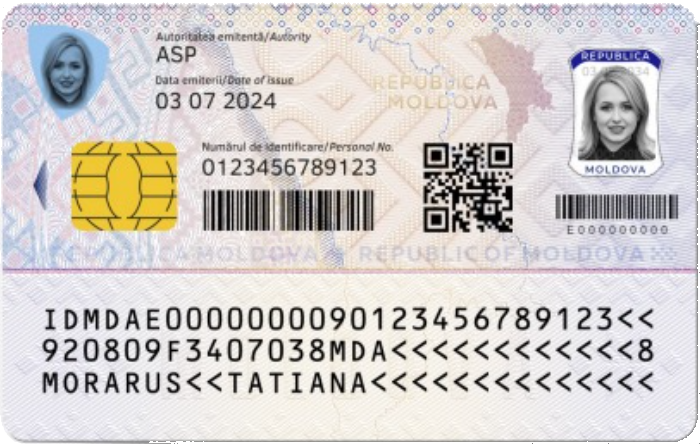
Back side (2025 series)

== See also ==
- Moldovan passport
- List of identity card policies by country
