= Soviet passport =

Passport issued to Soviet citizens

USSR passport
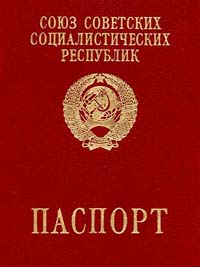
- The front cover of a Soviet passport, 1991 series

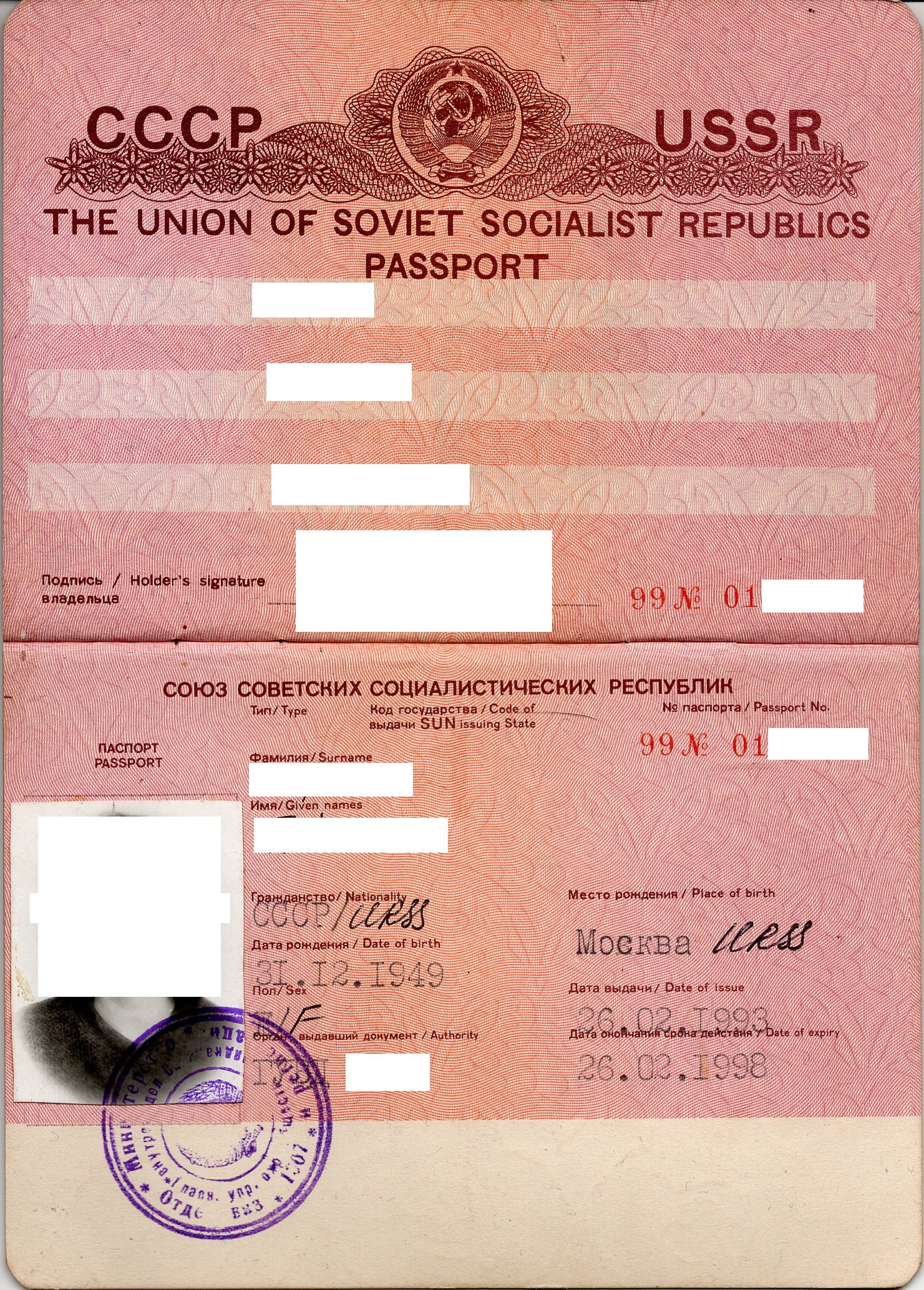
- Bio page of a Soviet passport, 1991 series
- Type: Passport
- Issued by: USSR Ministry of Internal Affairs
- Purpose: Identification, travel
- Valid in: Russian Federation
- Eligibility: USSR citizenship

The Soviet passport (Russian: Паспорт СССР) was an identity document and passport issued pursuant to the laws of the Union of Soviet Socialist Republics (USSR) for citizens of the USSR.

After the dissolution of the Soviet Union in 1991, Soviet passports continued to be issued until 2000 in the Russian Federation, and in other post-Soviet states, until they were replaced with national passports gradually by 2001. All Soviet passports remain valid as an identity document in the Russian Federation to this date.

Soviet passports remained valid in Estonia until 1997, in Kazakhstan until 1999, in Latvia until 2000, in Tajikistan and Ukraine until 2002, in Turkmenistan and Uzbekistan until 2003, in Belarus, Kyrgyzstan, Abkhazia and South Ossetia until 2004, in Armenia, Artsakh and Azerbaijan until 2005, in Georgia and Lithuania until 2006, in Transnistria until 2010, and in Moldova until 2014.

== History ==
The passport system of the Soviet Union underwent a number of transformations in the course of its history. In the late Soviet Union citizens of age sixteen or older had to have an internal passport. In addition, a passport for travel abroad (заграничный паспорт, загранпаспорт, zagranpasport, often confusingly translated as "foreign passport") was required for travel abroad. There were several types of abroad passport: an ordinary one, known simply as "USSR zagranpasport", a civil service passport (служебный паспорт, sluzhebny pasport), a diplomatic passport, and a sailor's passport.

Internal passports were serviced by "passport offices" (паспортный стол, pasportny stol) of local offices of the MVDs of Soviet republics. Abroad passports were handled by the Ministry of Foreign Affairs of the corresponding Soviet republic.

Internal passports were used in the Soviet Union for identification of persons for various purposes. In particular, passports were used to control and monitor the place of residence by means of propiska. Officially, propiska was introduced for statistical reasons: since in the planned economy of the Soviet Union the distribution of goods and services was centralized, the overall distribution of population was to be monitored. For example, a valid propiska was necessary to receive higher education or be employed.

The passports recorded the following information: surname, first name and patronymic, date and place of birth and ethnicity, family status, propiska, and record of military service. Sometimes the passport also had special notes, for example blood group. As mentioned, the internal passports identified every bearer by ethnicity (национальность, natsional'nost'), e.g., Russian, Ukrainian, Uzbek, Estonian, Jew, etc. When an individual applied for a passport at age 16, they had to select the ethnicity of one of their parents. All residents were required by law to record their address on the document, and to report any changes to a local office of the Ministry of Internal Affairs. For example, by the age of forty-five, a person had to have three photographs of themselves in the passport – to account for the effects of aging – taken at the age of sixteen (when it was issued), twenty-five and forty-five. At different stages of development of the Soviet passport system, they could also contain information on place of work, social status (marriage, children), and other supporting information needed for those agencies and organizations to which the Soviet citizens used to appeal.

The internal passports were written in the Russian language and the language of the republic where it was issued. Passports for travel abroad were written Russian and French. Starting in 1991, French was replaced by English.

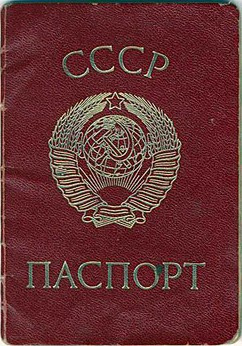
Cover page of a 1974 Soviet Union passport

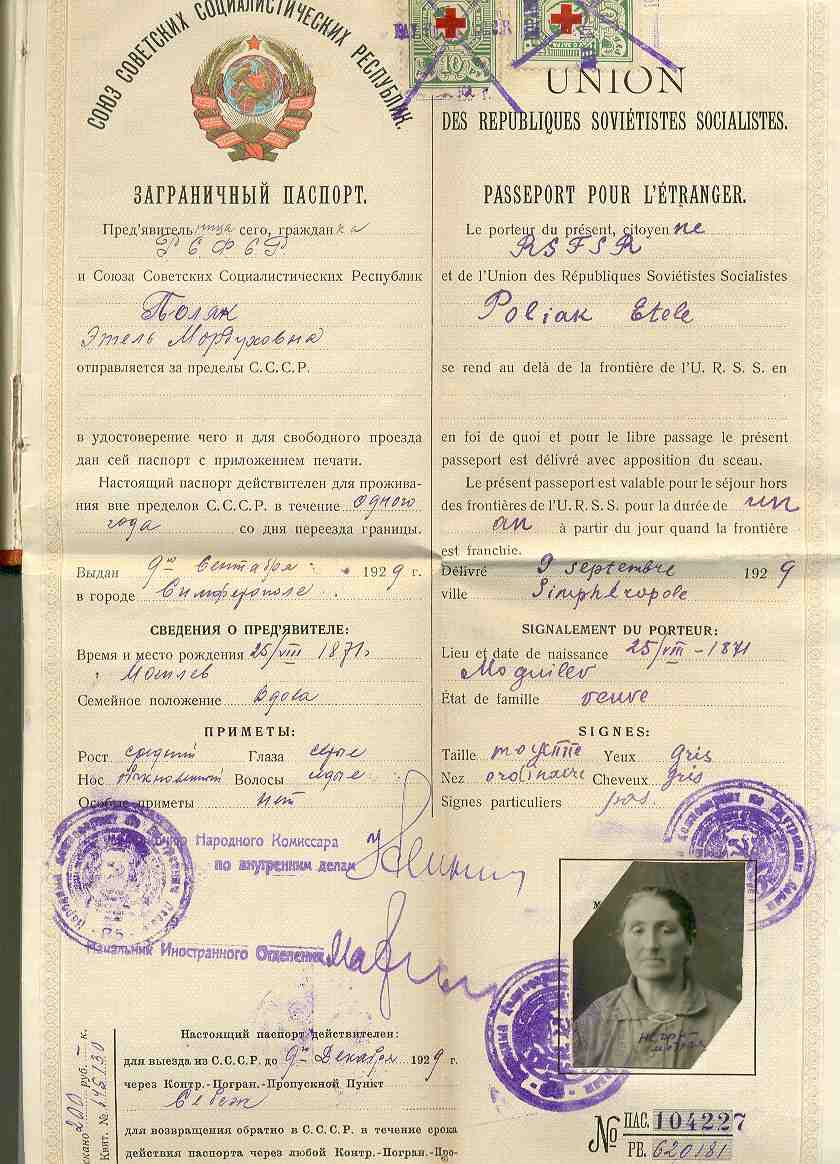
USSR passport for travel abroad, year 1929

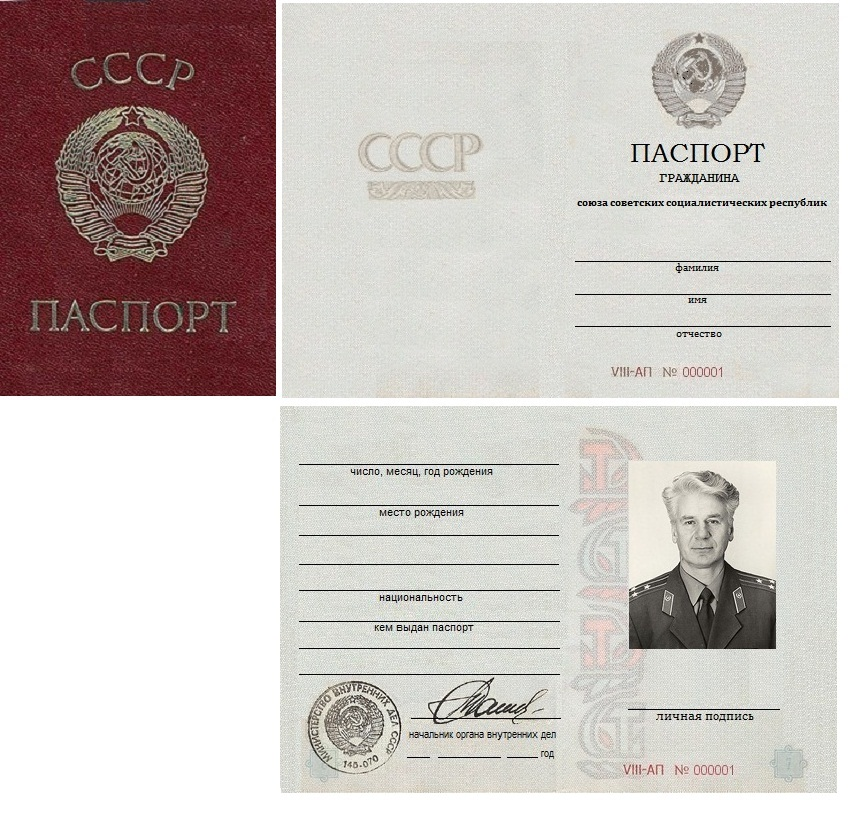
Soviet passport, year 1974–1991

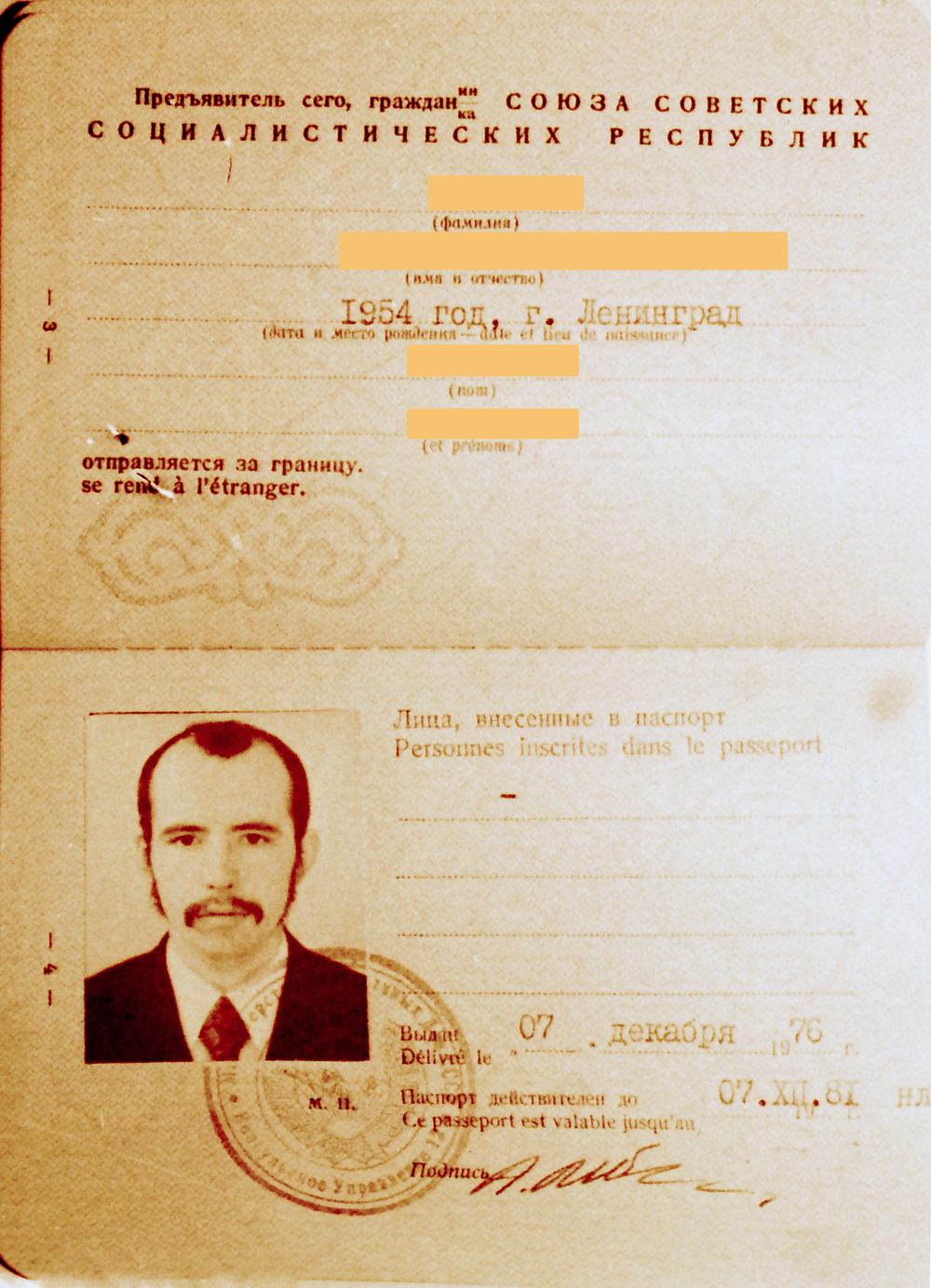
USSR passport for travel abroad, bio page 1976

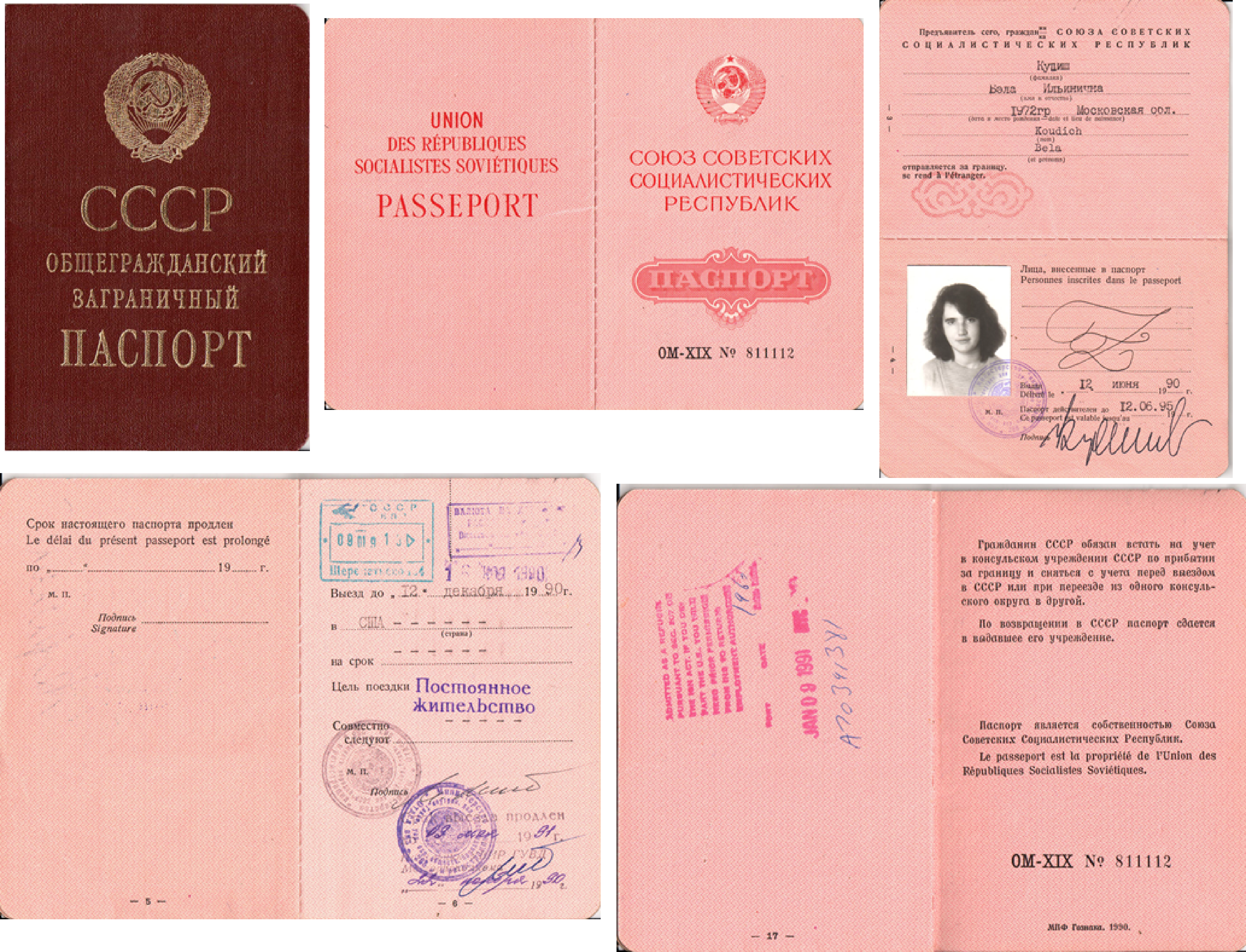
USSR passport for travel abroad, year 1990

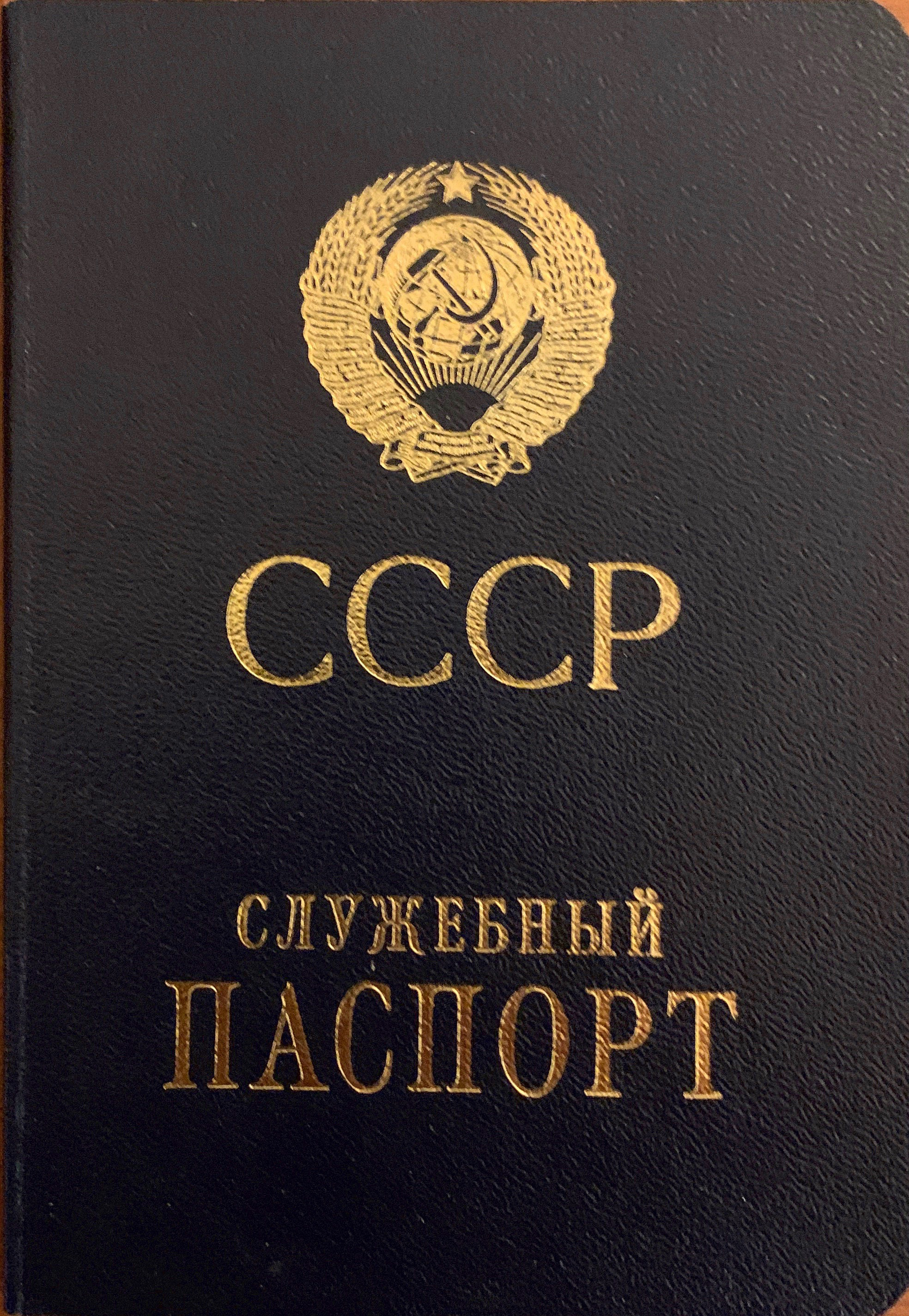
USSR service passport issued in 1984

=== Passport for international travel 1991 series ===
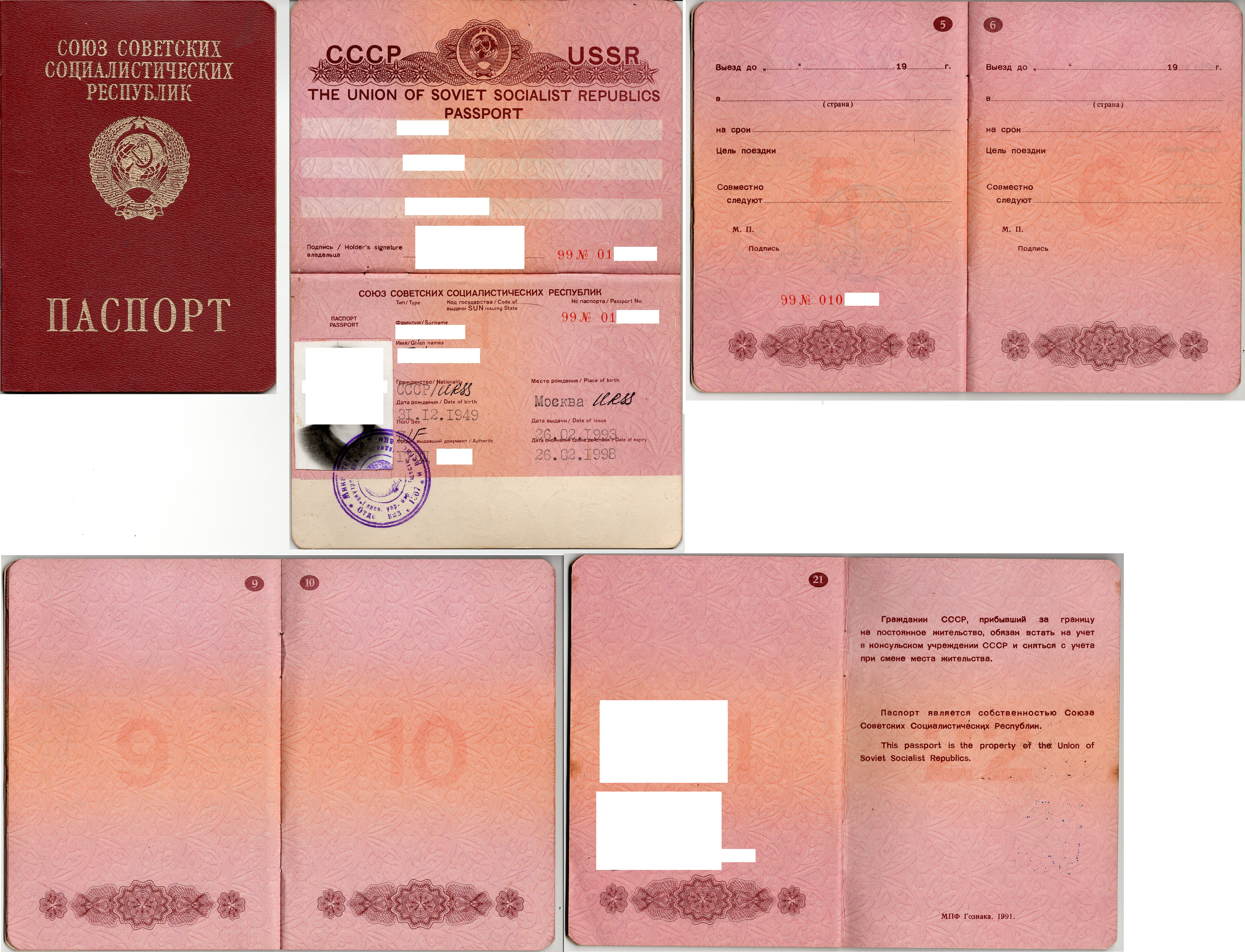
USSR passport for travel abroad, 1991 series

Each passport has a data page and a signature page. A data page has a visual zone and no machine-readable zone. The visual zone has a photograph of the passport holder, data about the passport, and data about the passport owner under the writing "СОЮЗ СОВЕТСКИХ СОЦИАЛИСТИЧЕСКИХ РЕСПУБЛИК" (UNION OF SOVIET SOCIALIST REPUBLICS):

- Photograph
- Type of document ("P" for "passport")
- Code of the issuing country (always 'SUN')
- Passport number
- Surname in Latin alphabet
- Given name(s) in Latin alphabet
- Nationality (usually 'СССР / URSS')
- Date of birth (DD.MM.YYYY format)
- Place of birth
- Sex
- Date of issue
- Date of expiration
- Authority

The page next to the data page - the signature page, contains under the emblem of the USSR, the writing "UNION OF SOVIET SOCIALIST REPUBLICS", and contains:

- Last name in Russian
- First name in Russian
- Patronymic in Russian
- Signature of the holder

Notes on the last page of the passport:

Гражданин СССР, прибывший за границу на постоянное жительство, обязан встать на учет в консульском учреждении СССР и сняться с учета при смене места жительства.

translation: A citizen of the USSR who has arrived abroad for permanent residence is required to register with the consular office of the USSR and deregister when changing his place of residence.

Паспорт этот является собственностью Союза Советских Социалистических Республик.
This passport is the property of the Union of Soviet Socialist Republics.

== Replacement passports ==
Soviet passports were eventually replaced by the following national passports in post-Soviet states between 1992 and 2005. Below are the replacement passports with year of first issue.

=== Countries ===
1997: Russian passport (including Internal passport of Russia)

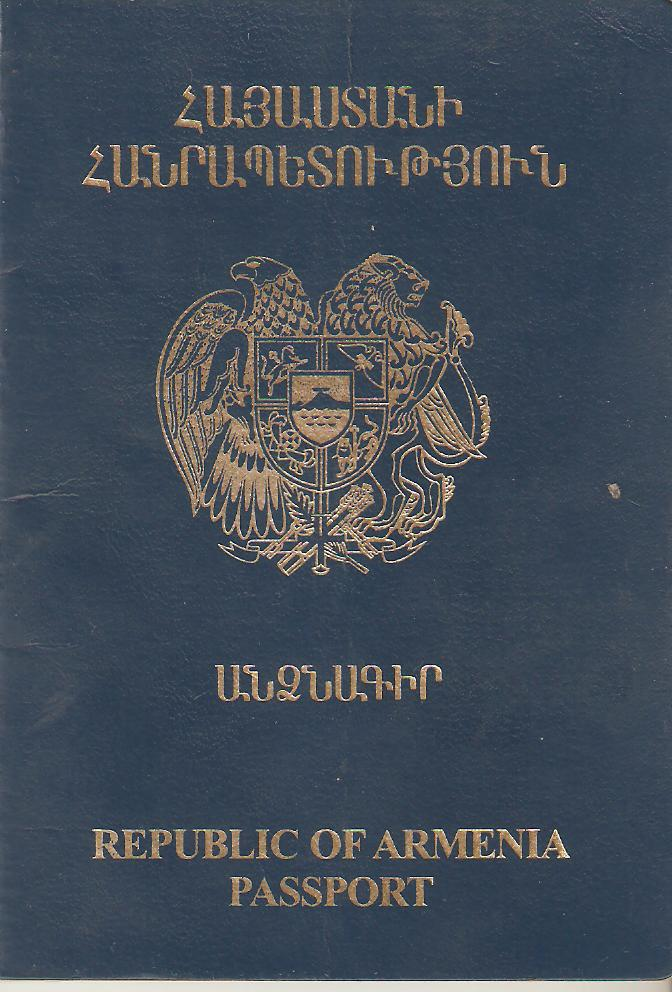
1994: (Armenia) Armenian passport

1998: (Azerbaijan) Azerbaijani passport

1996: (Belarus) Belarusian passport

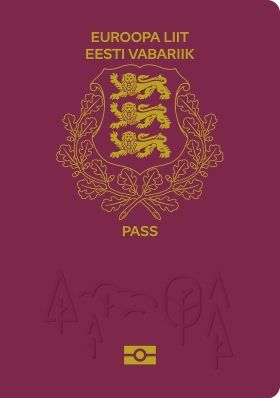
1996: (Estonia) Estonian passport

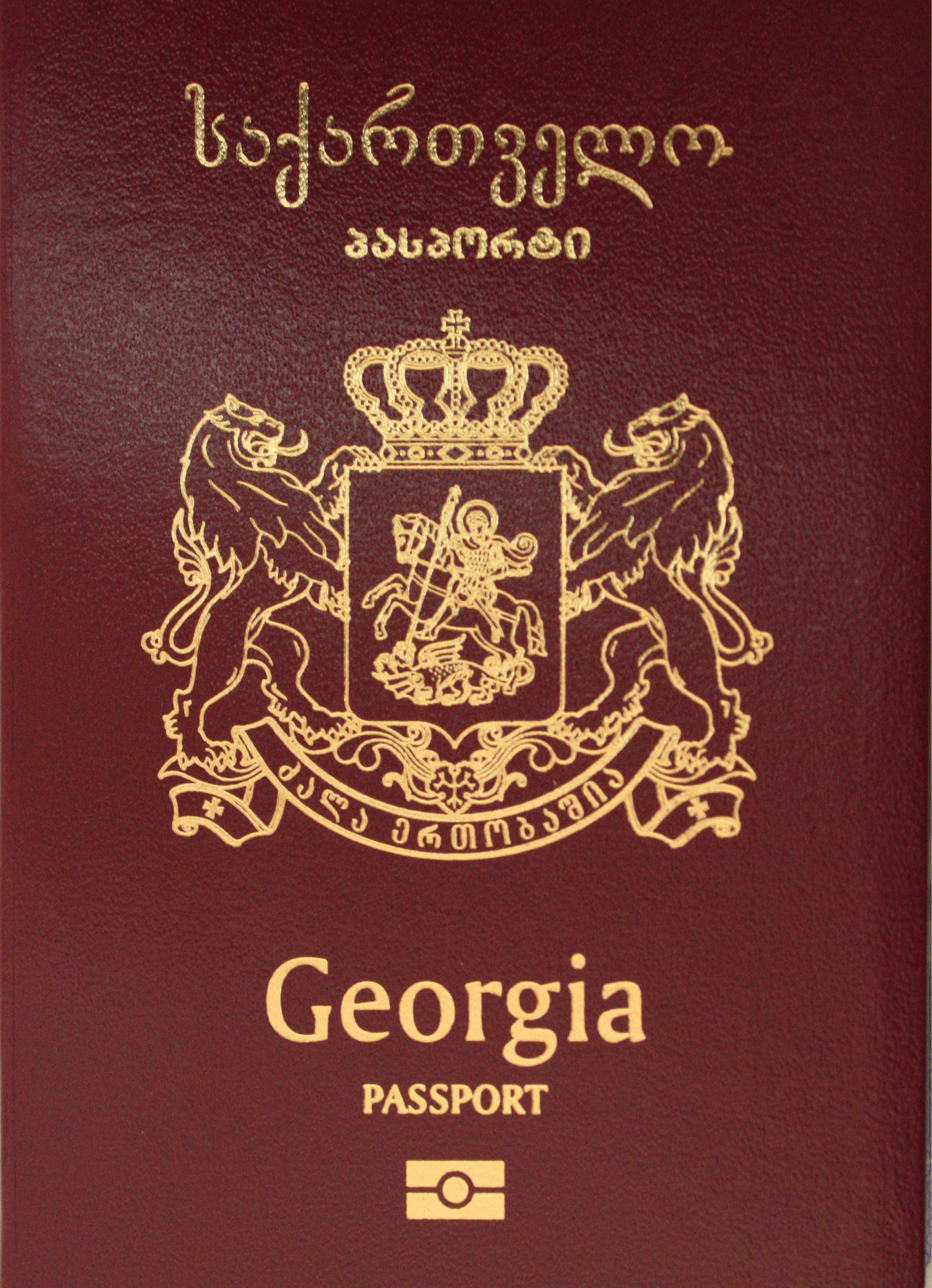
1994: (Georgia (country)) Georgian passport

1995: (Kazakhstan) Kazakhstani passport

1994: (Kyrgyzstan) Kyrgyzstani passport

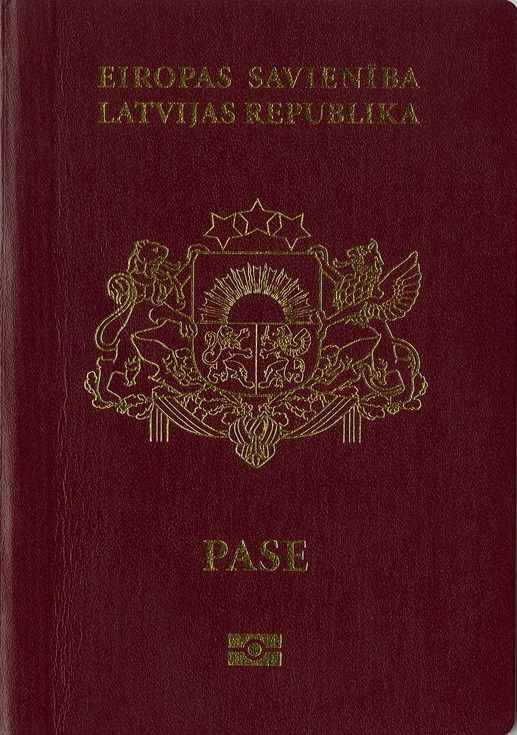
1992: (Latvia) Latvian passport

1992: (Lithuania) Lithuanian passport

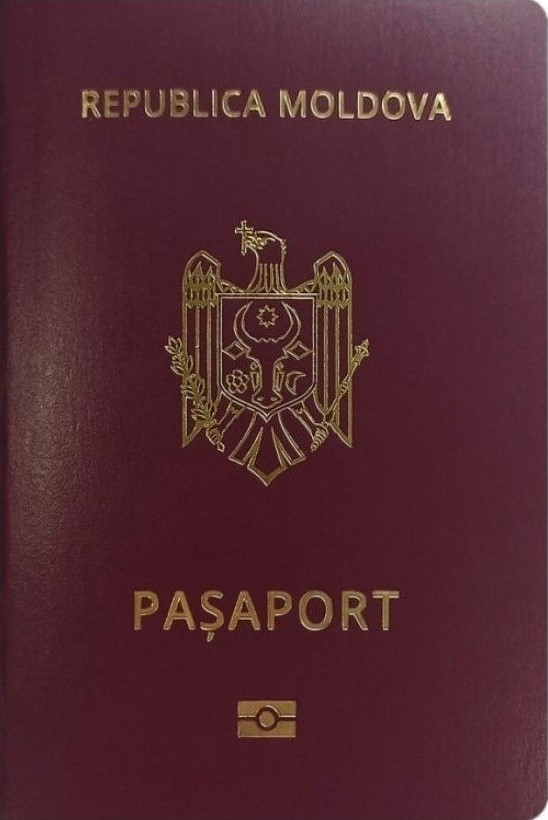
1995: (Moldova) Moldovan passport

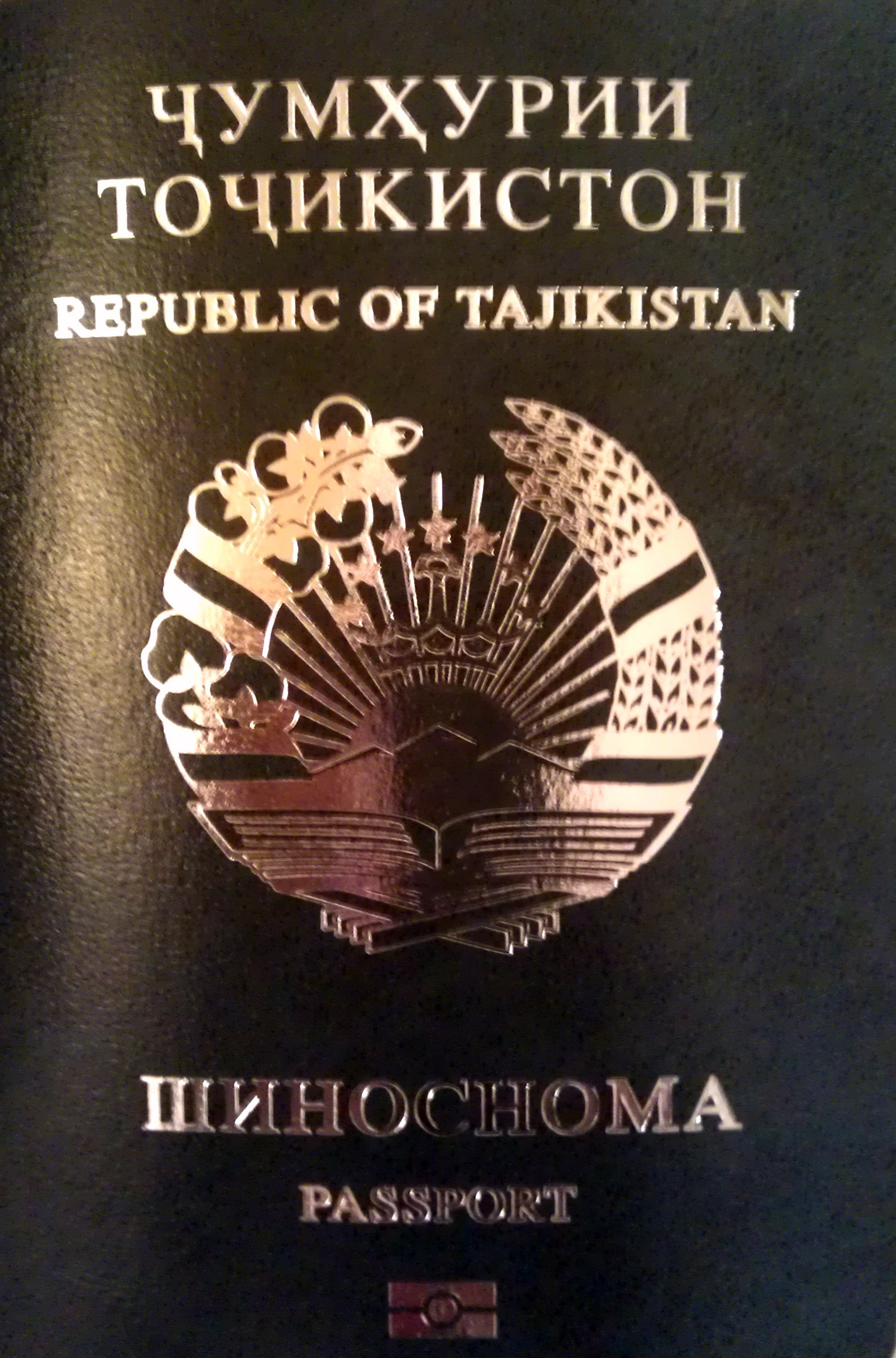
1998: (Tajikistan) Tajik passport

1996: (Turkmenistan) Turkmen passport

1995: (Uzbekistan) Uzbek passport

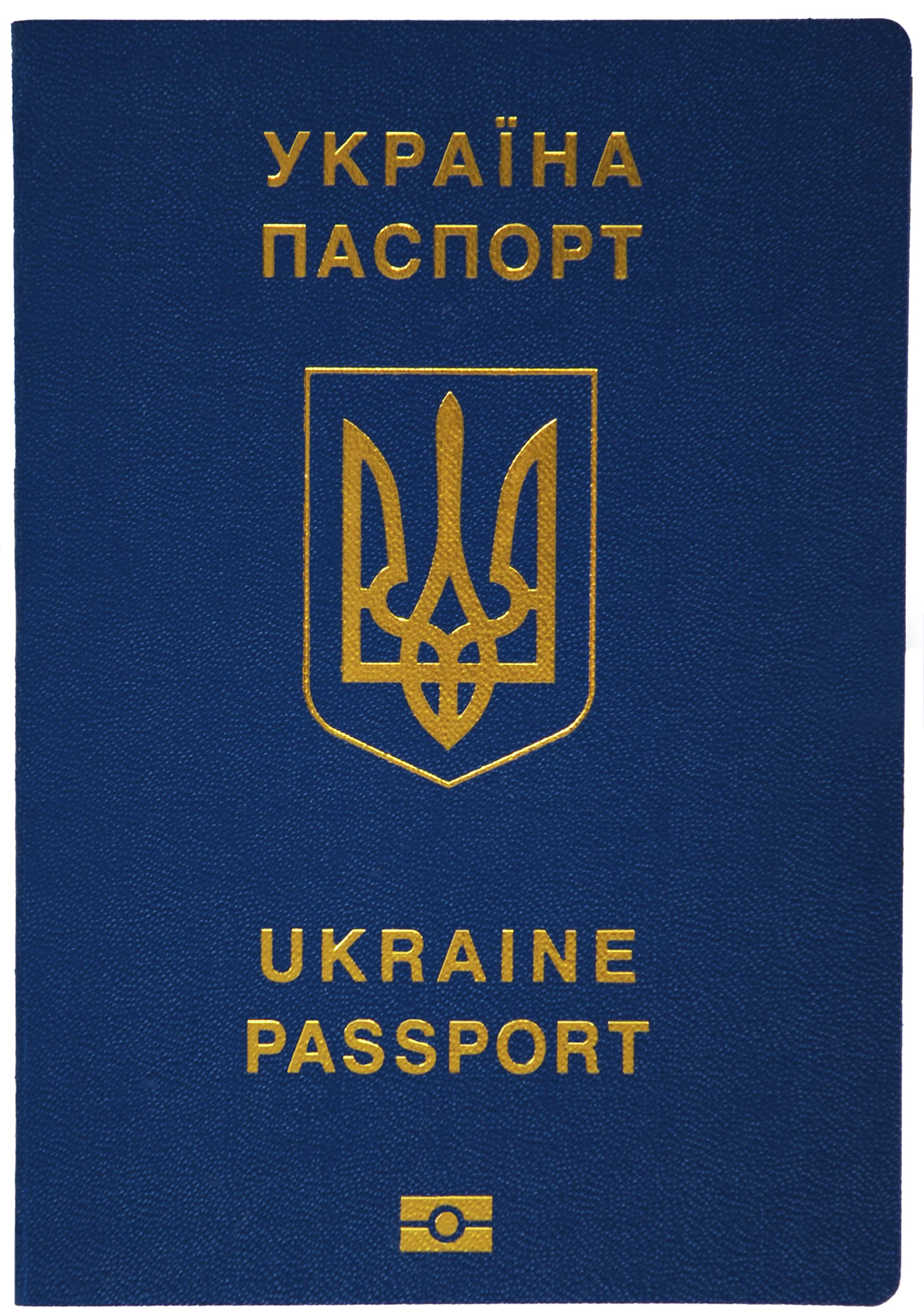
1994: Ukrainian passport (including internal passport of Ukraine)

=== Disputed territories ===
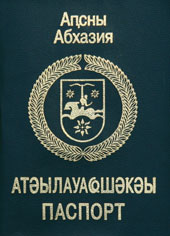
2006: (Abkhazia) Abkhazian passport

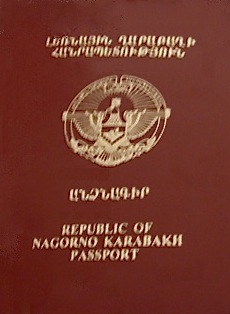
2006-2024: (Republic of Artsakh) Artsakh passport

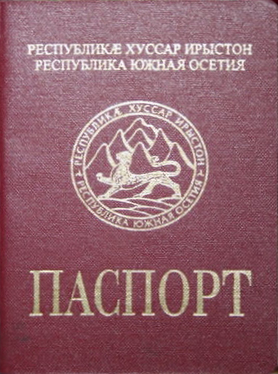
2006: (South Ossetia) South Ossetian passport

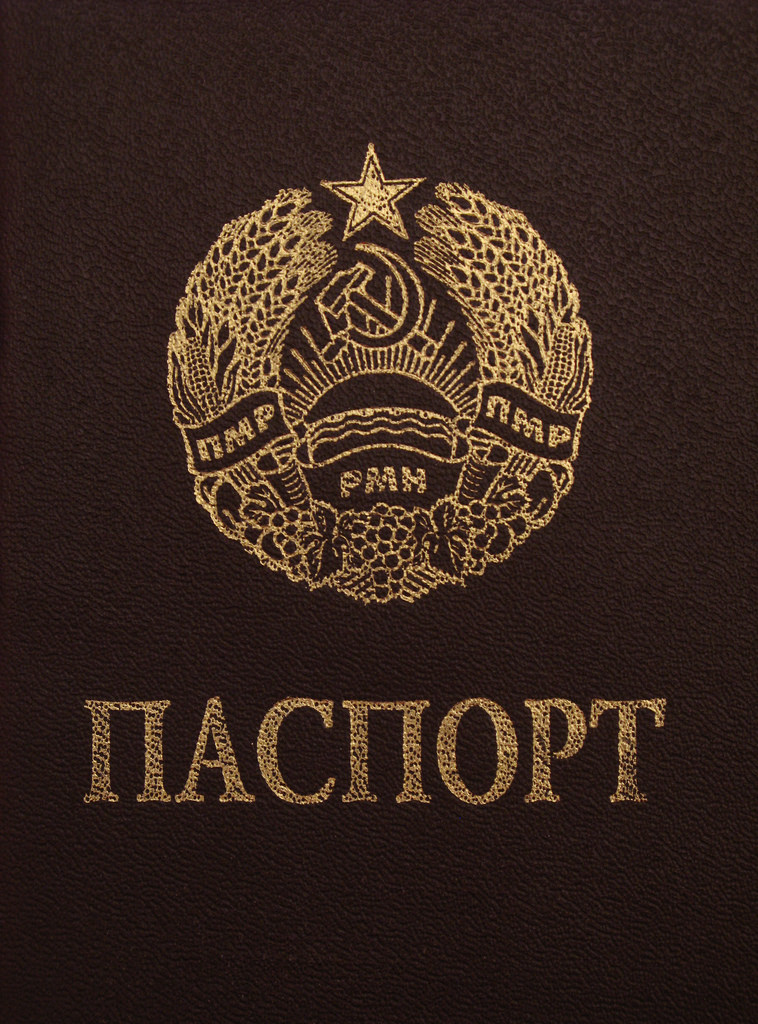
2001: (Transnistria) Transnistrian passport

== See also ==
- Passport system in the Soviet Union
- Eastern Bloc emigration and defection
- 101st kilometre
- Propiska
