= Visa requirements for Transnistrian citizens =

Administrative entry restrictions

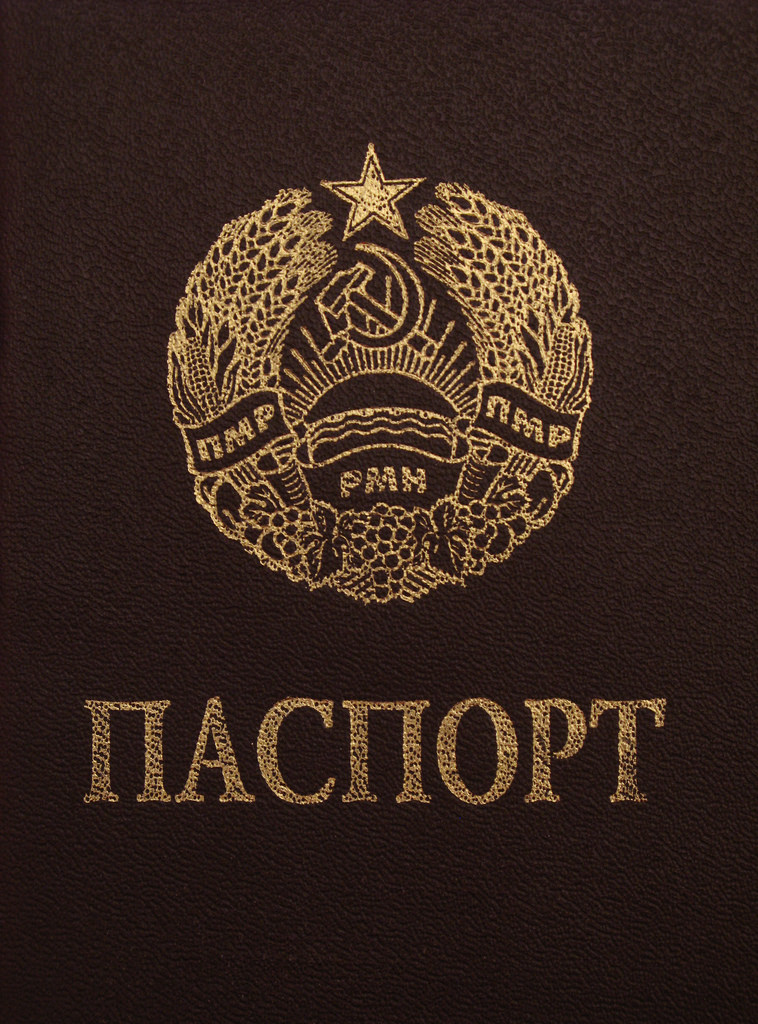
A Transnistrian passport

Visa requirements for Transnistrian citizens are administrative entry restrictions by the authorities of other states placed on citizens of the Transnistria.

== Validity ==
Transnistria is not recognized by the majority of nations of the world (with the exceptions of the partially recognized Abkhazia and South Ossetia). Transnistrian passport is not valid for travel to most countries in the world. Dual nationality is permitted. Most citizens are entitled to either a Moldovan, Russian or Ukrainian passport for travel abroad.

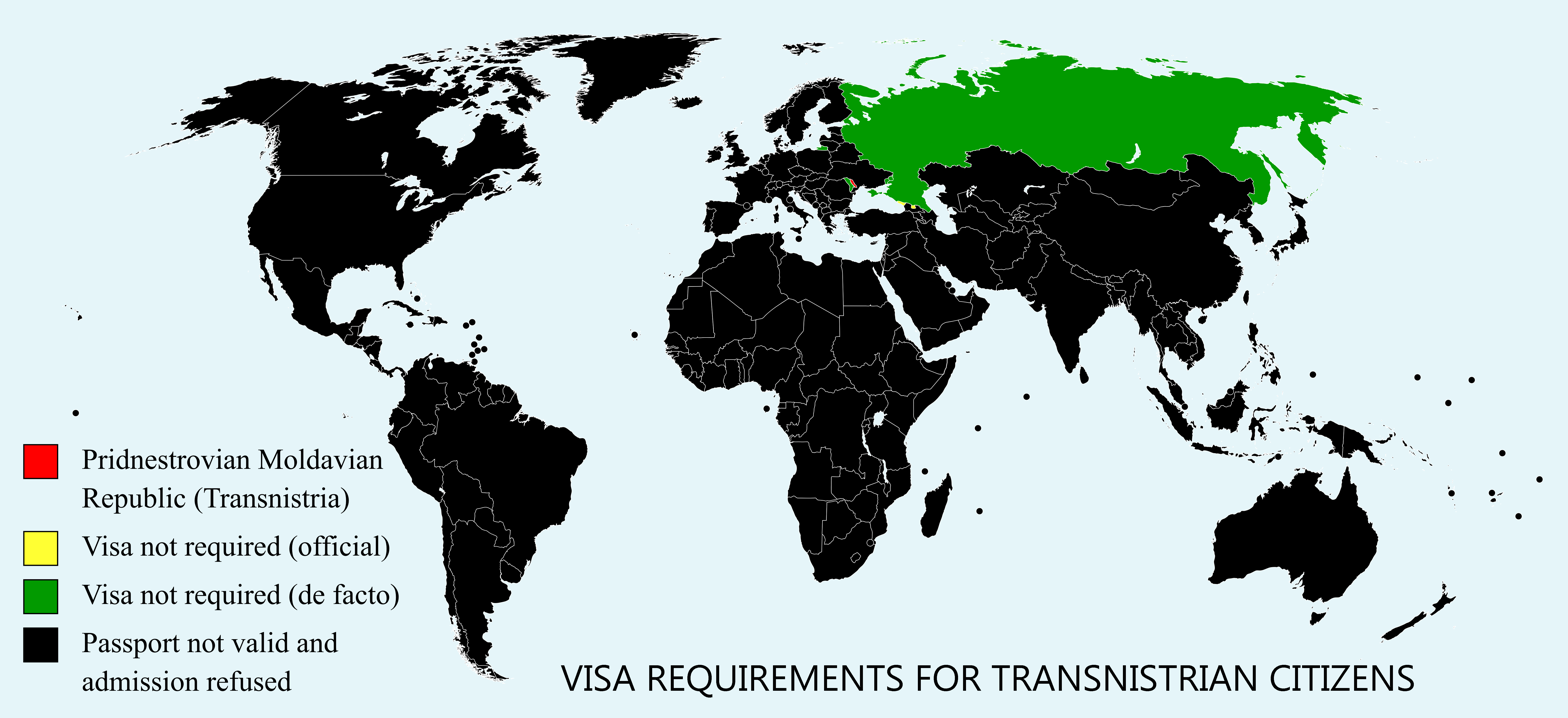

Transnistrian passport can only be used to travel to Abkhazia and South Ossetia. These countries are visa-free for Transnistrian citizens.

Abkhazia
Moldova
Russia
South Ossetia

== See also ==
- Visa policy of Transnistria
- Transnistrian passport
