= Visa policy of Transnistria =

Policy on permits required to enter Transnistria

Transnistria does not require foreign citizens to obtain a visa; however, foreign citizens need to obtain and fill out a migration card (scanners are installed at some checkpoints to automatically fill them out). The validity period is 45 days with the possibility of extension for a period not exceeding 3 years. In addition, citizens belonging to the members of the Community for Democracy and Rights of Nations may also visit Transnistria without a visa. Foreign citizens may enter using an internal passport or an ID card in lieu of a passport.

As entry is possible only via land, foreign citizens must satisfy the entry requirements for either Moldova or Ukraine.

== Visa policy map ==
Visa policy of the Pridnestrovian Moldovan Republic The Pridnestrovian Moldovan Republic Visa not required (45 days) Admission restricted

== Admission restrictions ==
Since 1 April 2023, free entry into the territory of Transnistria is prohibited for all citizens of Ukraine aged between 18 and 60 years old, unless they have obtained permission from the Ministry of State Security of Transnistria. Affected citizens of Ukraine may apply for a permit to enter Transnistria through a local Transnistrian contact, who submits an electronic or written application to obtain the permit. The permit is generally issued within three working days, but can take up to ten days.

Citizens of Ukraine who have previously entered Transnistria after 24 February 2022, or who are traveling to their wives, husbands, parents, children or siblings living in Transnistria and hold proof of such links are exempt from the entry restrictions.

== See also ==
- Visa requirements for Transnistrian citizens
- Visa policy of Moldova
- Visa policy of Artsakh
- Visa policy of Abkhazia
- Visa policy of South Ossetia
