= Transnistrian passport =

Passport of the unrecognized European state

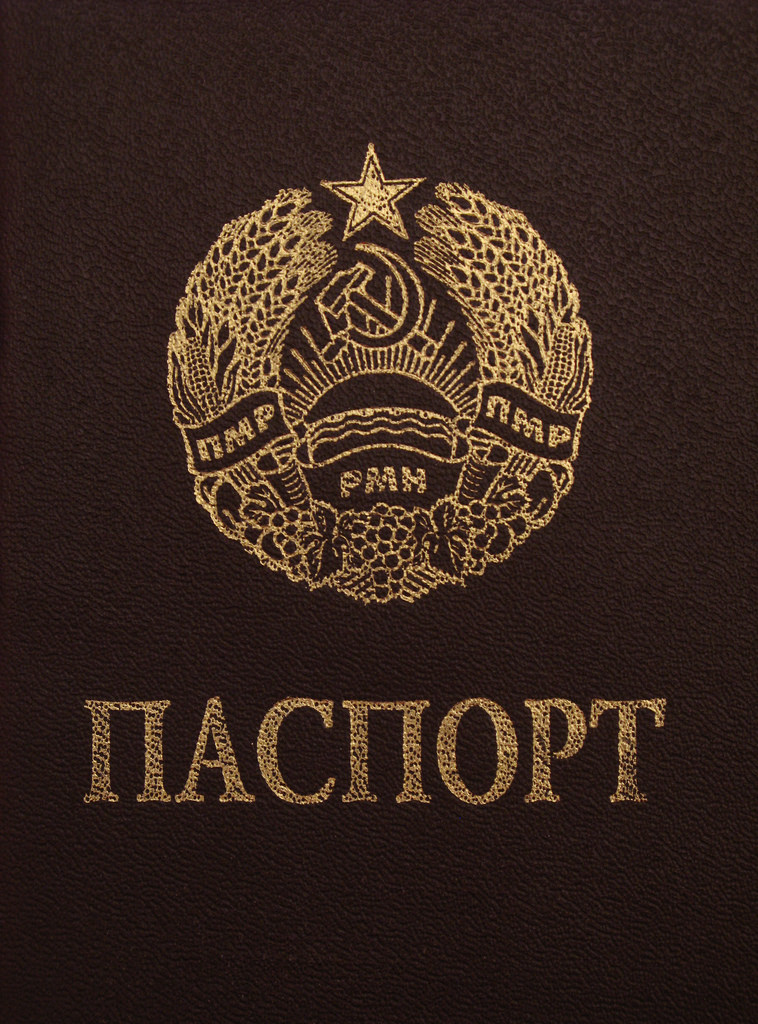
- The front cover of a contemporary Transnistrian passport.
- Type: Passport
- Issued by: Ministry of Internal Affairs
- First issued: 1 October 2001
- Purpose: Identification
- Valid in: Transnistria: Abkhazia; South Ossetia
- Eligibility: Transnistrian citizenship

The Transnistrian passport is issued to citizens of the Pridnestrovian Moldavian Republic (also known as Transnistria) for the purpose of international travel and for the purpose of legal identification within Transnistria.

== History ==
The first Transnistrian passport was issued on 1 October 2001.

Until then, starting in the mid-1990s, citizens were issued a paper insert in addition to a passport of another state (or a Soviet Union passport, whose design was used from 1974 until its expiration after the fall of the Soviet Union in 1991) indicating the citizen's connection with Transnistria.

== Validity ==
Transnistria is not recognized by any country of the world (with the exceptions of the partially recognized Abkhazia and South Ossetia). Transnistrian passport is only valid for travel to Moldova. As dual nationality is permitted, most people affected are entitled to either a Moldovan, Romanian, Russian or Ukrainian passport for travel abroad.

== Visa Requirements ==
Transnistria Visa not required Visa required Passport not accepted

Transnistrian passport holders are required to apply for a visa if they wish to travel to the Dominican Republic.

On 25 October 2016, the governments of the Pridnestrovian Moldavian Republic (PMR) and Abkhazia signed an agreement on mutual visa-free travel. It was ratified by the Supreme Council on 25 January 2017 and subsequently signed into law by the president on 3 February 2017.

Country	Visa requirement	Allowed stay	Notes (excluding departure fees)	Reciprocity
Abkhazia	Visa not required	90 days		
Dominican Republic	Visa required	30 to 120 days	The default authorized stay for any tourist entering the Dominican Republic is 30 days. However, this period can be formally extended through a stay extension processed at the General Directorate of Migration, up to a maximum total of 120 days.	

== See also ==
- Visa requirements for Transnistrian citizens
- Moldovan passport
- Romanian passport
- Russian passport
- Soviet Union passport
- Ukrainian passport
