= Visa policy of Moldova =

Policy on permits required to enter Moldova

Visitors to Moldova must obtain an e-Visa unless they are citizens from one of the visa-exempt countries.

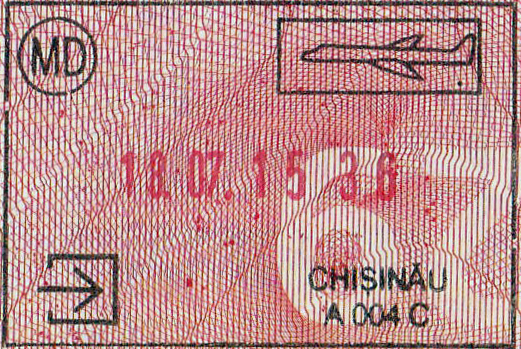
Entry stamp of Moldova

Moldovan visa specimen

All visitors must hold a passport (or machine-readable national ID Card for EU, Icelandic, Liechtensteiner, Monégasque, Norwegian, Sammarinese, Swiss and Turkish citizens) valid for 3 months beyond the period of intended stay.

Moldova's visa and other migration policies are also implemented in accordance with the mobility rights arrangements within the Commonwealth of Independent States.

== Visa policy map ==
Visa policy of Moldova Moldova Visa not required - may enter with an ID card (90 days) Visa not required (90 days) eVisa eVisa (only with an invitation letter) Admission refused

== Visa exemption ==
=== Ordinary passports ===
Citizens of the following countries and territories, as well as stateless persons and refugees residing in those countries, may enter the Republic of Moldova without a visa for a period of up to 90 days within any 180-day period:

- All European Union member states^{ID}

- Albania
- Andorra
- Antigua and Barbuda
- Argentina
- Armenia
- Australia
- Azerbaijan
- Bahamas
- Barbados
- Belarus
- Bosnia and Herzegovina
- Brazil
- Brunei
- Canada
- Chile
- Colombia
- Costa Rica
- Dominica
- El Salvador
- Georgia
- Grenada
- Guatemala
- Honduras
- Hong Kong
- Iceland^{ID}
- Israel
- Japan
- Kazakhstan
- Kiribati
- Kyrgyzstan
- Liechtenstein^{ID}
- Macau
- Malaysia
- Marshall Islands
- Mauritius
- Mexico
- Micronesia
- Monaco^{ID}
- Montenegro
- New Zealand
- Nicaragua
- North Macedonia
- Norway^{ID}
- Palau
- Panama
- Paraguay
- Peru
- Qatar
- Russia
- Saint Kitts and Nevis
- Saint Lucia
- Saint Vincent and the Grenadines
- Samoa
- San Marino^{ID}
- Serbia
- Seychelles
- Singapore
- Solomon Islands
- South Korea
- Switzerland^{ID}
- Tajikistan
- Timor-Leste
- Tonga
- Trinidad and Tobago
- Turkey^{ID}
- Tuvalu
- Ukraine^{ID*}
- United Arab Emirates
- United Kingdom
- United States
- Uruguay
- Uzbekistan
- Vanuatu
- Vatican City
- Venezuela

_{ID — May enter with a machine-readable national ID card (including Irish passport card) in lieu of a passport.}
_{ID* - May enter with an ID card only for 1 entry from Ukraine and 1 exit to Ukraine.}

Date of visa changes

Citizens of Armenia, Azerbaijan, Belarus, Georgia, Kazakhstan, Kyrgyzstan, Russia, Tajikistan, Ukraine und Uzbekistan have never required a visa to enter Moldova.

- 11 October 1990: Romania
- 1 January 2007: Canada, European Union member states, Iceland, Japan, Norway, Switzerland, United States
- 1 June 2010: Andorra, Israel, Liechtenstein, Monaco and Vatican
- from 1 July 2013 (as country of the EU) or 3 January 2014 (Under Law №257): Croatia
- 3 January 2014: Australia, Bahamas, Barbados, Chile, Ecuador, Hong Kong, South Korea, Malaysia, Macau, New Zealand, San Marino, Seychelles, Singapore and Turkey
- 31 July 2015: Albania, Montenegro, North Macedonia
- 6 August 2015: Serbia
- 1 March 2016: Bosnia and Herzegovina
- 24 March 2017: United Arab Emirates
- 13 April 2018: Antigua and Barbuda, Argentina, Brazil, Brunei, Colombia, Costa Rica, Dominica, El Salvador, Grenada, Guatemala, Honduras, Kiribati, Marshall Islands, Mauritius, Mexico, Micronesia, Nicaragua, Palau, Panama, Paraguay, Peru, Saint Kitts and Nevis, Saint Lucia, Saint Vincent and the Grenadines, Samoa, Solomon Islands, Timor-Leste, Tonga, Trinidad and Tobago, Tuvalu, Uruguay, Vanuatu, Venezuela
- 1 March 2019: Cuba
- 12 November 2022: Qatar

Cancelled:

- Estonia and Latvia: 1 August 1993 (was resumed on 1 January 2007)
- Lithuania: 1 November 1993 (was resumed on 7 July 2005)
- Turkmenistan: 9 June 1999
- Bulgaria: 1 November 1999 (was resumed on 1 January 2007)
- Czech Republic: 22 October 2000 (was resumed on 1 January 2007)
- Hungary: 1 January 2001 (was resumed on 1 January 2007)
- Poland: 14 February 2001 (was resumed on 1 January 2007)
- Ecuador and Cuba: 12 February 2025

==== Substitute visa ====
Holders of a valid visa or residence permit issued by any Schengen Area member state, Canada, the United Kingdom or the United States may enter Moldova without a visa for up to 90 days within any 180-day period.

However, this policy does not apply to citizens of the following countries and territories:

- African Union member states (except Cape Verde, Comoros, Eswatini, Gabon, Madagascar, Mauritius, São Tomé and Príncipe, Seychelles, South Africa and Togo)

- Afghanistan
- Bangladesh
- Bhutan
- Indonesia
- Iran
- Iraq
- Jordan
- Laos
- Lebanon
- Myanmar
- Nepal
- North Korea
- Pakistan
- Palestine
- Philippines
- Sri Lanka
- Suriname
- Syria
- Turkmenistan
- Vietnam
- Yemen

=== Non-ordinary passports ===
In addition to countries whose citizens are visa-exempt, holders of diplomatic or official/service passports of China, India, Indonesia, Iran, Turkmenistan and Vietnam may enter Moldova without a visa.

== Electronic visa (e-Visa) ==
Citizens of other countries may obtain an e-Visa. Processing times may take up to 20 days.

Foreigners who come from the states that must present an invitation issued by the General Inspectorate for Migration of the Ministry of Internal Affairs of Moldova, are not exempt from presenting this document, when applying for the e-Visa.

=== Invitation letter required ===
Citizens of the following countries are required to provide an invitation letter in order to obtain a visa for Moldova:

- African Union member states (except Cape Verde, Comoros, Gabon, Madagascar, Mauritius, Sahrawi Arab Democratic Republic, São Tomé and Príncipe, Seychelles and South Africa)

- Afghanistan
- Bangladesh
- Bhutan
- Indonesia
- Iran
- Iraq
- Jordan
- Laos
- Lebanon
- Myanmar
- Nepal
- North Korea
- Pakistan
- Palestine
- Philippines
- Sri Lanka
- Suriname
- Syria
- Turkmenistan
- Vietnam
- Yemen

Anyone, regardless of nationality, having a valid visa or a residence permit issued by any Schengen Area member state, Canada, the United Kingdom or the United States is exempted from the invitation letter requirement.

== Visa types ==
The Moldovan visa is a document, which is placed in the passport. It contains the name and the indication of nationality.

=== Requirements for Tourist Visa ===
A tourist visa entitles its holder only to tourism trips and visits of relatives and/or friends. Tourist visa holders are prohibited to engage in business or work activities in the Republic of Moldova.

=== Requirements for Temporary Residence Visa/Work Visa ===
Anyone wishing to live and work in Moldova will be required to apply for a temporary residence visa. To obtain a temporary visa for employment purposes, you will need to secure a job offer from a Moldovan company or government department, or a foreign company based in Moldova. The criteria for approval of an employment visa include suitable educational qualifications or work experience, a secured employment contract in Moldova, provide proof of adequate means of subsistence in Moldova, police confirmation that you have no criminal record, and a satisfactory medical examination. All official documents must be translated into the Romanian language.

== Admission restrictions ==
Moldova does not recognize the passports of Abkhazia, Northern Cyprus, the Sahrawi Republic, Somaliland, South Ossetia and Transnistria.

=== Taiwan ===
Entry and transit is refused for citizens of Taiwan, even if not leaving the aircraft and proceeding by the same flight.

== Visitor statistics ==
Most visitors arriving in Moldova were from the following countries of nationality:

Country	2018	2017	2016	2015
Romania	2,524,403	2,140,028	1,864,586	1,300,945
Ukraine	1,069,066	1,049,307	974,357	1,013,779
Russia	322,256	314,266	247,846	258,320
Bulgaria	78,870	70,592	55,391	47,831
Italy	46,549	42,972	34,829	32,884
Germany	30,061	26,206	22,925	20,419
Turkey	25,936	24,529	21,193	21,818
Israel	28,358	22,891	20,551	17,518
United States	25,778	21,878	18,263	17,133
Belarus	20,039	16,469	13,930	14,136
Total	4,334,215	3,879,964	3,395,132	2,856,089

== See also ==
- Visa policy of Transnistria
- Visa requirements for Moldovan citizens
