= Moldovan passport =

International passport document

Moldovan passport; Pașaport moldovenesc
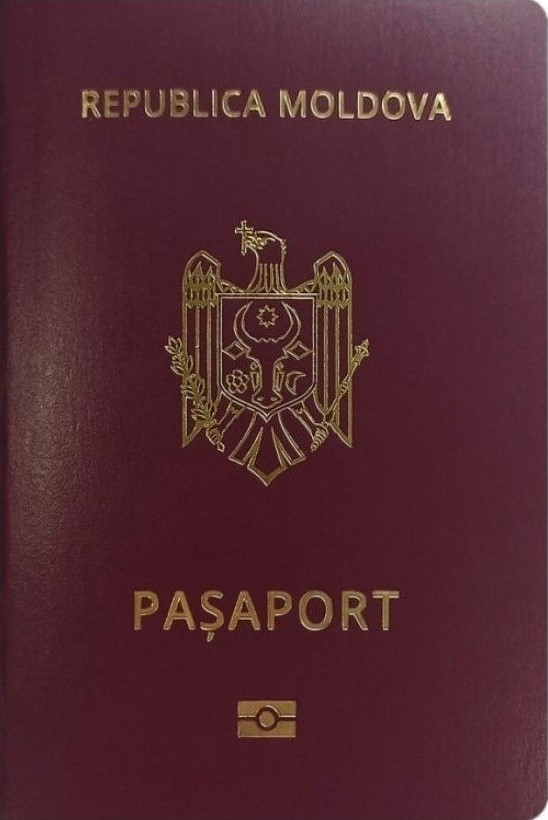
- Front cover of a Moldovan biometric passport (2023)

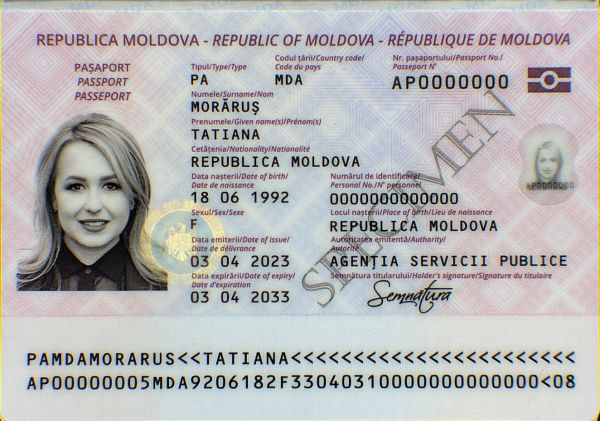
- Biodata card of a Moldovan biometric passport (2023)
- Type: Passport
- Issued by: Republic of Moldova
- First issued: 1 February 2008 (first biometric passport); 5 April 2023 (current version)
- Purpose: Identification
- Eligibility: Moldovan citizenship
- Expiration: 10 years; 5 years for citizens aged 0–7

A Moldovan passport (Romanian: pașaport moldovenesc) is an international document issued to citizens of the Republic of Moldova for the purpose of international travel. The passport is issued by the Public Services Agency and by Moldovan foreign representations abroad. The passport is valid for ten years. For children under the age of seven years it is valid for four years. Since 1 January 2006, Moldovan citizens can hold two passports simultaneously, providing a written request has been submitted to local passport office.

The first Moldovan biometric passport was issued on 1 January 2006. The new obligatory Moldovan biometric passport is available from 1 January 2011 and it costs at the moment 650 MDL (€32). The passport of the Republic of Moldova with biometric data contains a chip which stores the following digital information: holder's blood type, digital fingerprints and holder's digital image. For children under the age of 12 years it is not obligatory to submit digital fingerprints. Current non-biometric and old biometric passports will remain valid until expiration date and will be valid for travel along with new biometric passports.

== Physical appearance ==
The Moldovan passport has the Moldovan Coat of Arms emblazoned in the centre of the front cover. The most recently issued passports are burgundy in color, however previously issued ones are light blue in colour. The words "REPUBLICA MOLDOVA" are inscribed above the coat of arms and the word "PAȘAPORT" is inscribed below the coat of arms (both inscriptions in Romanian). The standard biometric symbol imprinted at the bottom of the cover page. The passport contains 32 pages.

== Types ==
Diplomatic (black)
Official (green)
Simple (burgundy)

== Data page and signature page ==
Each passport has a data page. A data page has a visual zone and a machine-readable zone. The visual zone has a digitized photograph of the passport holder, data about the passport, and data about the passport holder:

- Photograph
- Document type
- Country code MDA
- Passport serial number
- Surname
- Given name(s)
- Nationality (which states Republic of Moldova as an opposed to the ethnic identity of a person)
- Date of birth (DD/MM/YYYY)
- Personal No.
- Sex
- Place of birth
- Date of issue
- Issuing authority
- Date of expiration
- Holder's signature

=== Languages ===
The data page is printed in Romanian, English and French languages.

== Visa-free travel ==
Visa requirements for Moldovan citizens Moldova Visa free Visa issued upon arrival eVisa Visa available both on arrival or online Visa required prior to arrival

Visa requirements for Moldovan citizens are administrative entry restrictions by the authorities of other states placed on citizens of Moldova. As of 2024, Moldovan citizens had visa-free or visa on arrival access to 122 countries and territories, ranking the Moldovan passport 44th in the world according to the Henley Passport Index.

== See also ==
- Romanian passport
- Transnistrian passport
- Visa requirements for Moldovan citizens
- Visa policy of Moldova

== Gallery ==
Moldovan passports

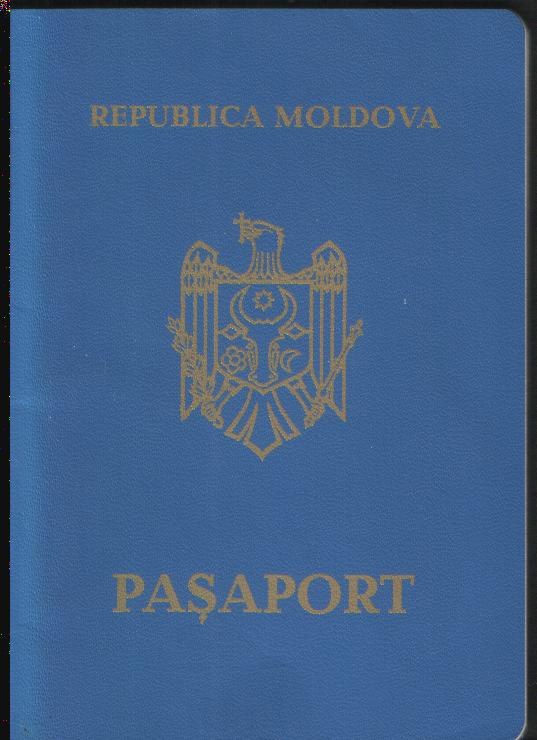
Moldovan passport 1995
Series A

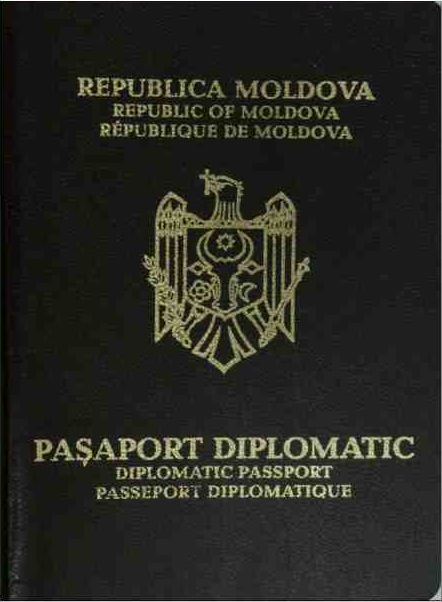
Moldovan Diplomatic passport 1995

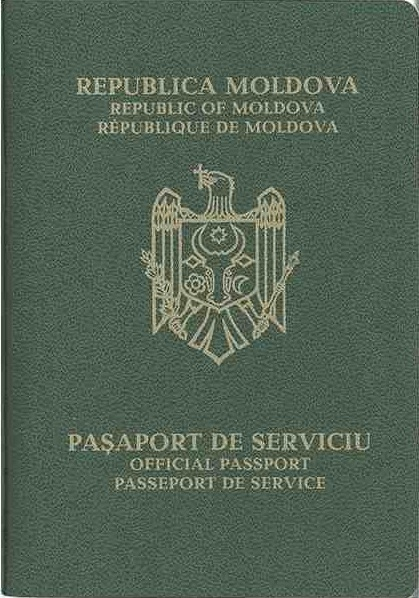
Moldovan Official passport 1995

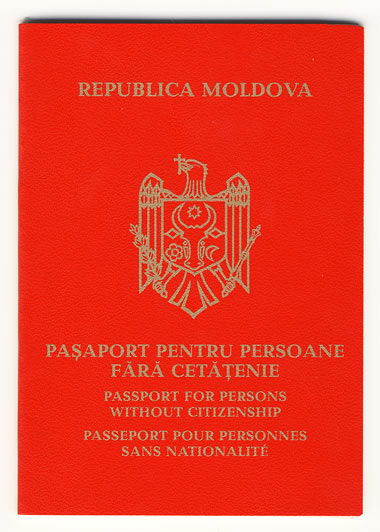
Moldovan Without Citizenship passport 1995

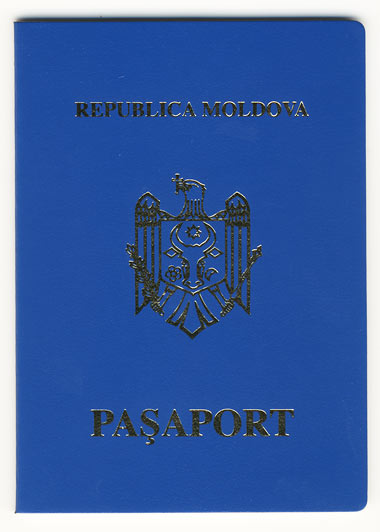
Moldovan passport 2009
Series B
