= Moldovan nationality law =

Law on Citizenship of the Republic of Moldova

Parliament of Moldova
- Citation: Nr. 1024/2000
- Territorial extent: Moldova (including Transnistria)
- Enacted by: Parliament of Moldova
- Enacted: 2 June 2000
- Commenced: 2 June 2000
- Status: Amended

Moldovan nationality law dates back to June 2, 2000 and has been amended several times, with the latest modifications being made in 2014. It is based on the Constitution of Moldova (articles 17, 18 and 19). It is mainly based on Jus sanguinis.

Dual nationality is allowed, under certain conditions.

Under the law, there are provisions for citizenship to be acquired by:

- Birth
- Recognition
- Adoption
- Recover
- Naturalisation

== Citizenship by birth ==
The Moldovan nationality law outlines several categories of persons who are entitled to citizenship:

In Moldova, up until 2023, followed the principle of unrestricted jus soli, and any person, regardless of their parents' citizenship status would acquire Moldovan nationality upon birth within the territory. However a modification in 2023 provided for a restricted jus soli law, which provides a permanent residency requirement for births on the territory. However, those under international protection are exempt from that permanent residency requirement.

Moldova's jus soli law provides for the international law precedent where foundlings on the territory are entitled to Moldovan nationality, until proven otherwise until attainment of 18 years of age.

A child born to at least one Moldovan parent abroad is also considered a Moldovan citizen by birth.

== Citizenship by recognition ==
You may gain Moldovan citizenship by:

1. Being born in the territory of the Republic of Moldova or by having a parent, or grandparent who was born there
2. Having resided in Bessarabia, in the North Bukovina, Hertsa Region, and the M.A.S.S.R. before 28 June 1940, or by being a descendant of such a prior resident and having lawful and habitual residence in the Republic of Moldova.
3. Having been deported from or having fled the Republic of Moldova since 28 June 1940, or being a descendant of such a deportee or refugee.

== Citizenship by naturalisation ==
Citizenship may be granted to anyone who has reached the age of 18, and who meets one of the following criteria:

1. Has resided in Moldova lawfully and habitually for the last ten years
2. has been married to a citizen of Moldova for at least three years
3. has resided lawfully and habitually for three years with parents or children (including adoptive) who are citizens of Moldova
4. Has resided lawfully and habitually for five years before reaching the age of 18
5. Is a stateless person or recognised refugee, who has been lawfully and habitually for at least 8 years

In addition they must fulfil the following criteria:

1. Knows and observes the provisions of the Moldovan constitution
2. Passed an exam in the national language
3. Possesses legal sources of income

== Dual citizenship ==
Moldova permits dual citizenship, for both born and naturalised citizens, however under Moldovan naturalisation law, there exists a category of citizens who may be required to renounce their citizenship. Some countries, however, do not permit multiple citizenship e.g. adults who acquired Moldovan and Japanese citizenship by birth must declare, to the latter's Ministry of Justice, before turning 22, which citizenship they want to keep.

== Controversy ==
On 28 September 2017, a new law allowing individuals to buy their citizenship for a fixed sum took effect. Moldovan pro-Russian president Igor Dodon tried to bring in investments from Russia stating that "The Moldovan passport could allow them to travel in Europe freely." These provisions were repealed by a law that entered into force on September 1, 2020.
