= Romanian nationality law =

Romanian Citizenship Act

Parliament of Romania
- Long title: An Act relating to Romanian citizenship
- Enacted by: Government of Romania
- Status: Current legislation

The Romanian nationality law addresses specific rights, duties, privileges, and benefits between Romania and the individual. Romanian nationality law is based on jus sanguinis ("right of blood"). Current citizenship policy in Romania is in accordance with the Romanian Citizenship Law, which was adopted by the Romanian Parliament on March 6, 1991, and the Constitution of Romania, which was adopted on November 21, 1991. The National Authority for Citizenship is the principal state organ responsible for granting citizenship.

== Background ==
Romania was under communist rule between 1947 and 1989. During the early phases of communism, the principles of Jus Sanguinis were emphasized and a strong sense of nationalism was demanded of all Romanian citizens. International migration was rigorously controlled by the regime and the population was under strict observation. The 1971 Law on Romanian Citizenship upheld these principles and expressed the superiority of Romanian citizenship. “Law No. 24 on Romanian Citizenship of December 1971 stipulated that descendants of a Romanian woman were automatically ascribed Romanian citizenship, regardless of the father’s citizenship”. Article 5 of the Law reads: “As an expression of the relationship between parents and children, of the uninterrupted continuity on the fatherland of previous generations that fought for social and national freedom, children born from Romanian parents on the territory of the Socialist Republic of Romania are Romanian citizens.” The law also stipulates that “the president of the republic alone, as representative of the executive power..." could grant or withdraw Romanian citizenship.

Economic and socio-political crises of the 1980s brought with it a change in understanding Romanian homogeneity. Conflict arose between the Hungarian and Romanian nations and confusion between citizenship and national identity led to many questions regarding the boundaries of the nation and the rights of Hungarian minorities living in Romania. After the fall of communism in Eastern Europe in 1989, citizenship laws in Romania were redrafted in the newly formed constitution. Interactions between the citizenship policies of the various Eastern European countries led to new discussions regarding dual-citizenship, which had traditionally been forbidden for Romanian citizens.

== Current law's foundation ==
Romanian nationality law is founded on the social policy of jus sanguinis by which nationality or citizenship is not determined by place of birth, but by the citizenship of one's ancestor. It contrasts with jus soli ("right of soil"), in which citizenship is determined by one's place of birth.

In respect to foundlings, Romanian nationality law does contain an element of jus soli. Foundlings who are found in Romania are considered Romanian citizens until proven otherwise.

== The law ==
From Article #5; Law 21 – The children born from Romanian citizens on Romanian territory are Romanian citizens. Furthermore, Romanian citizens are also those:

- born on Romanian territory, even if only one of the parents is a Romanian citizen;
- born abroad with at least one parent holding Romanian citizenship.

Romanian citizenship can be acquired after eight years of residency in the country while demonstrating a working knowledge of the Romanian language and knowledge of Romanian culture.

== Acquiring Romanian citizenship ==
Citizenship in Romania can be acquired by four methods: birth, adoption, repatriation, and request.

- Birth: All children born to Romanian citizens acquire citizenship at birth. The child may be born on Romanian territory or abroad and only one parent need be a Romanian citizen. Additionally, any child found on Romanian territory is granted citizenship if neither of the parents are known.
- Adoption: Citizenship is granted to any child who is legally adopted by Romanian citizens. If only one foster parent is a Romanian citizen, the child is still eligible for Romanian citizenship and the decision is made by the foster parents. If they are unable to reach a mutual agreement, the qualified court of law will decide. If the child is 14 years of age or older, their consent is necessary.
- Repatriation: Any person who has lost Romanian citizenship can regain citizenship if he so wishes. Additionally, any child or grandchild of someone who has lost their citizenship is entitled to repatriation.
- Acquiring by Request: Citizenship may be granted to foreign citizens or a person without citizenship who qualify by inclusion of one of the following three categories:
  - Was born in Romania and currently resides there;
  - Has resided in Romania for at least eight years; or
  - Has resided in Romania and been married to a Romanian citizen for at least five years.

Applicants must also be at least 18 years of age and have a good understanding of the Romanian language and culture.

There are a number of qualifiers that may allow removing up to half of the time-requirements to gain Romanian citizenship, such as if the applicant is an internationally recognized personality; the applicant is a citizen of a European Union Member State; the applicant has obtained refugee status; or the applicant has invested in Romania amounts exceeding €1,000,000.

=== The consequences of naturalization and restoration of Romanian nationality ===
Article #10 of the law stipulates that: "Romanian nationality can be granted to the person who lost this nationality and requests its restoration, keeping his/her foreign nationality..."

Certain countries do not allow for multiple citizenship or, in the case that they do allow it, they provide for automatic loss of their citizenship upon obtaining the nationality of another country through a voluntary decision (free choice). The Romanian state cannot guarantee that the foreign citizen keeps their foreign citizenship when restoring their Romanian nationality. All Dutch citizens who restored their Romanian nationality before 1 April 2003, have lost their Dutch citizenship. All Dutch citizens who restored their Romanian nationality after 1 April 2003 and do not fulfill one of the three exceptions from the automatic loss of citizenship have lost their Dutch nationality. All adult Belgian citizens who restored their Romanian nationality before 9 June 2007 have lost their Belgian nationality.

The same applies to people who become naturalized as Romanian nationals.

This does not constitute a fault of the Romanian state, since "according to the Romanian Constitution and Article #1; paragraph 3; Law No. 21/1991 with the subsequent changes and additions, republished, the nationals of Romania enjoy the protection of the Romanian state — such provisions do not mention any duty of the Romanian state in respect to former and/or future Romanian nationals".

The implementation of dual citizenship led to many criticisms in the years that followed. The policy was criticized for being both too inclusive and too exclusive. Some scholars argued that the policy attempted to uphold the principle in the Romanian constitution that "Romanian sovereignty belongs to the Romanian people", by focusing its efforts towards ethnic homogeneity rather than diversity. Contrarily, neighboring Eastern European countries claimed that the policy was a tool of "creeping expansion" and remained skeptical of the motives behind Romania's new-found inclusiveness. While the policy is still discussed today, Romania's acceptance into the European Union in 2007 changed the focus on the citizenship discussion within Romania and with neighboring countries seeking acceptance into the EU themselves, criticism has dwindled abroad.

=== Honorary Citizen ===
Article #40 of the Romanian Citizenship Law states: "The Romanian citizenship titled 'honorary citizenship' may be granted to some foreigners for special services in favor of the country and the Romanian people, on the Government proposal, with no other formality, by the Romanian Parliament. The persons who acquire honorary citizenship enjoy all the civilian and political rights that are recognized to the Romanian citizens, except the right of electing and being elected and that of carrying out a public rank."

== Dual citizenship ==
In accordance with the Law on Romanian Citizenship of 1991, Romanian citizens currently have the right to hold dual citizenship. Romanian citizens who apply for dual citizenship are not required to establish their residency in Romania and, if accepted, are granted all the same rights as non-dual citizens. The Romanian policy on dual citizenship is irrelevant to other states policy. In order to successfully become a dual citizen of Romania, a person must also meet the requirements of dual citizenship in the other country. There have been cases in which applicants have successfully restored their Romanian citizenship and as a result, lost citizenship of another country. The Romanian state does not claim responsibility for the loss of citizenship to another state as a result of being granted dual citizenship by Romania.

== Citizenship of the European Union ==
Because Romania is a member state of the European Union, Romanian citizens are also citizens of the European Union under European Union law and thus enjoy rights of free movement and have the right to vote in elections for the European Parliament. When in a non-EU country where there is no Romanian embassy, Romanian citizens have the right to get consular protection from the embassy of any other EU country present in that country. Romanian citizens can live and work in any country within the EU as a result of the right of free movement and residence granted in Article 21 of the EU Treaty.

== Losing Romanian Citizenship ==
Romanian Citizenship can be lost by withdrawing Romanian Citizenship or accepting the disclaiming of Romanian citizenship. Committing serious crimes that harm the Romanian state, or enlisting in the army of a state that Romania has broken any diplomatic relations with, while abroad are both means for withdrawal. A citizen can disclaim his citizenship so long as he is not being charged in a criminal case or owes some sort of debt to any individual or corporate body of the state.

Regardless of an individual's actions, Romanian Citizenship cannot be withdrawn if acquired by birth.

== Travel freedom of Romanian citizens ==
Visa requirements for Romanian citizens

Visa requirements for Romanian citizens are administrative entry restrictions by the authorities of other states placed on citizens of Romania. In 2025, Romanian citizens had visa-free or visa-on-arrival access to 178 countries and territories, ranking the Romanian passport 15th in the world according to the Visa Restrictions Index.

In 2017, the Romanian nationality is ranked twenty-fifth in the Nationality Index (QNI). This index differs from the Visa Restrictions Index, which focuses on external factors including travel freedom. The QNI considers, in addition to travel freedom, on internal factors such as peace & stability, economic strength, and human development as well.

== See also ==
- Romanian identity card
- Romanian passport
- Visa policy of Romania
- Visa requirements for Romanian citizens
