= Romanian identity card =

National identity card of Romania

Romanian identity card Carte de identitate
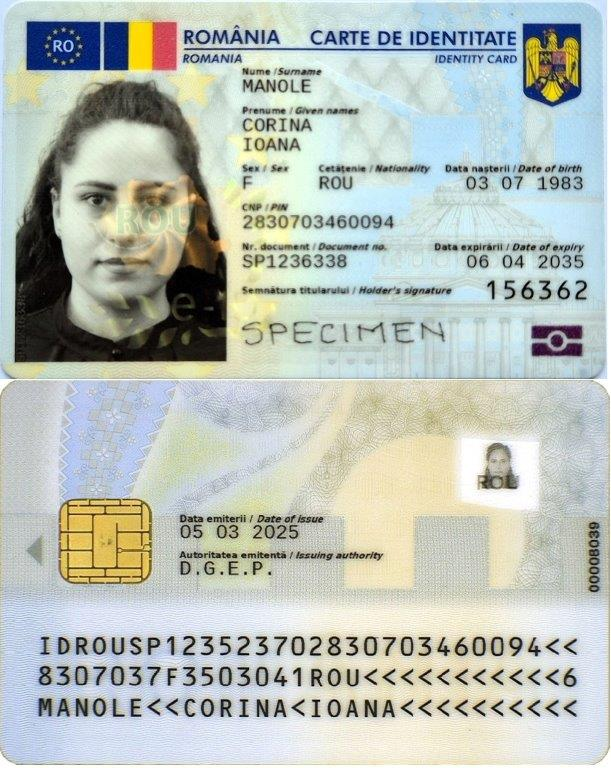
- The biometric model issued since 2025
- Type: Identity card, optional replacement for passport in the listed countries
- Issued by: General Directory for Persons’ Record (DGEP)
- First issued: 1997; 2 August 2021 (new design and format, limited pilot project); 20 March to 20 June 2025 (new design and format, in the entire country)
- Purpose: Identification, travel
- Valid in: EFTA; European Union; Rest of Europe (except Belarus, Russia, Ukraine and United Kingdom) Georgia; Montserrat (max. 14 days); Overseas France; Turkey
- Eligibility: Romanian citizen over 14 years of age (mandatory), Proof of residence
- Expiration: For ID-1 model issued starting in 2025: 10 years For ID-2 model: No expiry, but not possible to travel outside Romania after 3 August 2031 (age 55 or over); 10 years or until 3 August 2031 for ID cards issued after 2 August 2021 (age 25–54); 7 years (age 18–24); 4 years (age 14–17)
- Size: ID-1 (new model); ID-2 (old model)

The Romanian identity card (Romanian: Carte de identitate, informally called Buletin) is an official identity document issued to every Romanian citizen residing in Romania. It is compulsory upon 14 years of age. Although Romanian citizens residing abroad are exempt from obtaining the identity card, if they intend to establish a temporary residence in Romania, they may apply for a provisional identity document (Romanian: Carte de identitate provizorie), which is valid for one year (renewable).

The identity cards are issued by the General Directorate for Persons’ Record, subordinated to the Romanian Ministry of Internal Affairs.

== History ==
The first identity documents for Romanian citizens were introduced following Decree No. 947 of 24 March 1921, which approved the implementation of Law No. 812 from 19 March 1915.

These documents, issued by the population registration office, included details such as the holder's civil status, nickname, home address, occupation, and physical characteristics (e.g., stature, hair, forehead, eyebrows, eyes, nose, mouth, chin, face shape, complexion, and any distinguishing marks).

Although the regulation established a standard format, the bulletins varied by county in size, color, and sometimes content.

In 1949, with the creation of a centralized population register, identity cards were standardized nationwide and called Buletin de identitate.

These newer bulletins contained less personal details than earlier versions, focusing mainly on the holder's photograph and basic information. Initially valid for 10 years, they could be extended by another 10 years by adding a new photograph before or at the date of expiry.

The format was also simplified: originally composed of 8 pages, it was reduced to 4 in 1990.

Law No. 105 of 1996 laid the foundation for the modern identity card system in Romania.

In June 1997, Romania began issuing a new format of identity card, integrated into a computerized system designed to provide benefits for both the state and its citizens. The identity card serves as official proof of identity, home address, and, where applicable, residence address for Romanian citizens aged 14 and above.

These documents are issued by the Local Public Community Service for Personal Records (Romanian: Serviciul Public Comunitar de Evidență Persoanelor), which operates under the authority of local and county councils, the General Council of the municipality, and the local councils of Bucharest's sectors.

Identity bulletins previously issued without expiry dates to senior citizens remained valid for use within Romania.

Since 2011, the Romanian Government attempted to implement more secure Electronic (Biometric) Identity Cards in line with the requirements of European Commission for general use, but the project fell short for a variety of reasons including privacy, religious freedom, cost and implementation strategy. On August 2, 2021, a pilot project for issuing electronic identity cards launched at the Local Public Community Service for Personal Records of Cluj-Napoca. A year later, in August 2022 the pilot expanded with the County Directorate of Personal Records (Romanian: Direcția Județeană de Evidență a Persoanei (DJEP)) began issuing electronic identity cards for the entire population of the region.

In September 2024 it was announced that a new prototype of the electronic identity card, currently undergoing final tests at the Ministry of the Interior, will have an increased level of security compared to the one issued in the pilot project in Cluj. The cards would be issued nationwide in the end of November that year and that holders would access 11 electronic services through the new cards, one of which would be the ability to access the ID card off the holder's mobile phone via a government app. In January 2025 the government announced further delay in the implementation due to technical difficulties encountered during the testing phase of the new chip.

On March 20, 2025, a gradual national roll-out of the electronic (biometric) identity card began, starting in Cluj-Napoca. In June 2025, a dedicated website was launched to provide detailed guidance on how to obtain the new card and to explain its features and security elements. Cards from the non-electronic, old model will continue to be valid until their designated expiry date.

== Information provided ==
- Series and number of the ID card (unique to the ID card itself, different for each card)
- CNP (Romanian: Cod Numeric Personal; English: Personal Numerical Code) the same for every ID card of the individual (see below)
- Surname(s)
- Given name(s)
- Sex
- Names of the parents (replaced with the nationality since 2009)
- Date of birth (not explicitly written on ID-2, but included in CNP)
- Address (replaced with signature on ID-1)
- Issuing authority (mostly "SPCLEP <City>")
- Validity (issuing date and expiration date, both in dd/mm/yyyy)

It also contains two rows of machine readable information, similar to those in passports.

=== Series of the ID card ===
The series of the ID card are formed of two letters, representing the abbreviation of the county (but not always) (the abbreviation is sometimes the same as the license plate indicative) or of the county's seat that issued the document.

City	County	ID series	License plate and new Electronic ID Card	CNP Code
București	-	DP, DR, DT, RD, RR, RT, RX, RK	B (MB on EID)	40, 41, 42, 43, 44, 45, 46
Alba Iulia	Alba	AX	AB	01
Alexandria	Teleorman	TR	TR	34
Arad	Arad	AR, ZR	AR	02
Bacău	Bacău	XC, ZC	BC	04
Baia Mare	Maramureș	MM, XM	MM	24
Bistrița	Bistrița-Năsăud	XB	BN	06
Botoșani	Botoșani	XT, ZT	BT	07
Brașov	Brașov	BV, ZV	BV	08
Brăila	Brăila	XR	BR	09
Buftea	Ilfov	IF	IF	23
Buzău	Buzău	XZ, ZB	BZ	10
Călărași	Călărași	KL	CL	51
Cluj-Napoca	Cluj	KX, CJ	CJ	12
Constanța	Constanța	KT, KZ	CT	13
Craiova	Dolj	DX, DZ	DJ	16
Deva	Hunedoara	HD	HD	20
Drobeta Turnu Severin	Mehedinți	MH	MH	25
Focșani	Vrancea	VN	VN	39
Galați	Galați	GL, ZL	GL	17
Giurgiu	Giurgiu	GG	GR	52
Iași	Iași	MX, MZ, IZ	IS	22
Miercurea Ciuc	Harghita	HR	HR	19
Oradea	Bihor	XH, ZH	BH	05
Piatra Neamț	Neamț	NT, NZ	NT	27
Pitești	Argeș	AS, AZ	AG	03
Ploiești	Prahova	PH, PX, PK	PH	29
Reșița	Caraș-Severin	KS	CS	11
Râmnicu Vâlcea	Vâlcea	VX	VL	38
Satu Mare	Satu Mare	SM	SM	30
Sfântu Gheorghe	Covasna	KV	CV	14
Sibiu	Sibiu	SB, SR	SB	32
Slatina	Olt	OT, SL	OT	28
Slobozia	Ialomița	SZ	IL	21
Suceava	Suceava	SV, XV	SV	33
Timișoara	Timiș	TM, TZ	TM	35
Târgoviște	Dâmbovița	DD	DB	15
Târgu Jiu	Gorj	GZ	GJ	18
Târgu Mureș	Mureș	MS, ZS	MS	26
Tulcea	Tulcea	TC	TL	36
Vaslui	Vaslui	VS	VS	37
Zalău	Sălaj	SX	SJ	31

== CNP ==
The card contains the individual's Cod Numeric Personal (CNP), or Personal Numeric Code, a unique identifying number. The CNP is unique for each person which is used for taxation and other purposes

The CNP consist of 13 digits as follows:

- 1 digit for the sex of the Person. 1=Male & 2=Female born before 1999, 3 & 4 before 1899, 5 & 6 before 2099, 7 & 8 for foreign residents
- 6 digits for date of birth, in the form of yy/mm/dd
- 2 digits represents the place of birth (County)
- 3 digits is a random number between 001 and 999. Each number is allocated only once per person per day
- The final digit is a control digit calculated from all the other 12 digits in the code as follows:

(n1*2+n2*7+n3*9+n4*1+n5*4+n6*6+n7*3+n8*5+n9*8+n10*2+n11*7+n12*9)%11 if the result is 10 then the digit is 1, otherwise is the result.

The CNP was established in 1978, through a decree signed by Nicolae Ceaușescu.

== Citizens who live abroad ==
Romanian citizens living abroad can apply for issuing first ID documents provided by law with diplomatic missions or consular offices in that State.

The identity card are issued as follows:

- a) first identity card is issued to the age of 14;
- b) for people aged 14–18 years the term of validity of the card is 4 years;
- c) for people aged 18–25 years the term of validity of the card is 7 years;
- d) for people aged 25< years the term of validity of the card is 10 years.

After age 55, the identity card is issued permanently valid (by making the validity date in excess of 40 years).

== Travel ==
The validity of the Romanian identity card for travel extends to all member states of the European Union, the Schengen Area, as well as the other European microstates such as San Marino, Vatican City, Monaco and Andorra.

Entry is also possible in the Western Balkan states of Albania, Bosnia and Herzegovina, Serbia (up to 90 days within 180 days), Kosovo, North Macedonia (up to 90 days within 180 days) and Montenegro (up to 90 days within 180 days, valid for 30 days).

Furthermore, the identity card serves as a recognized travel document in several other regions, including the Faroe Islands, French overseas territories, Georgia, Gibraltar, Republic of Moldova, Northern Cyprus (up to 90 days), Turkey (up to 90 days within 180 days), and Tunisia (on organized tours).

Limitations and exceptions

Most other countries require a passport and, in some cases, a travel visa. The United Kingdom (including all dependent territories except Gibraltar), Greenland, and the non-European parts of the Netherlands do not accept the Romanian identity card for entry.

When flying to French overseas territories, passengers may need to avoid transitional points in countries that do not recognize the ID card.

In the United Kingdom, when crossing the UK border and visiting the country, there is an exception until at least 31 December 2025 for accepting identity cards only from individuals who have settled or pre-settled status in the UK under the EU Settlement Scheme.

== Gallery ==
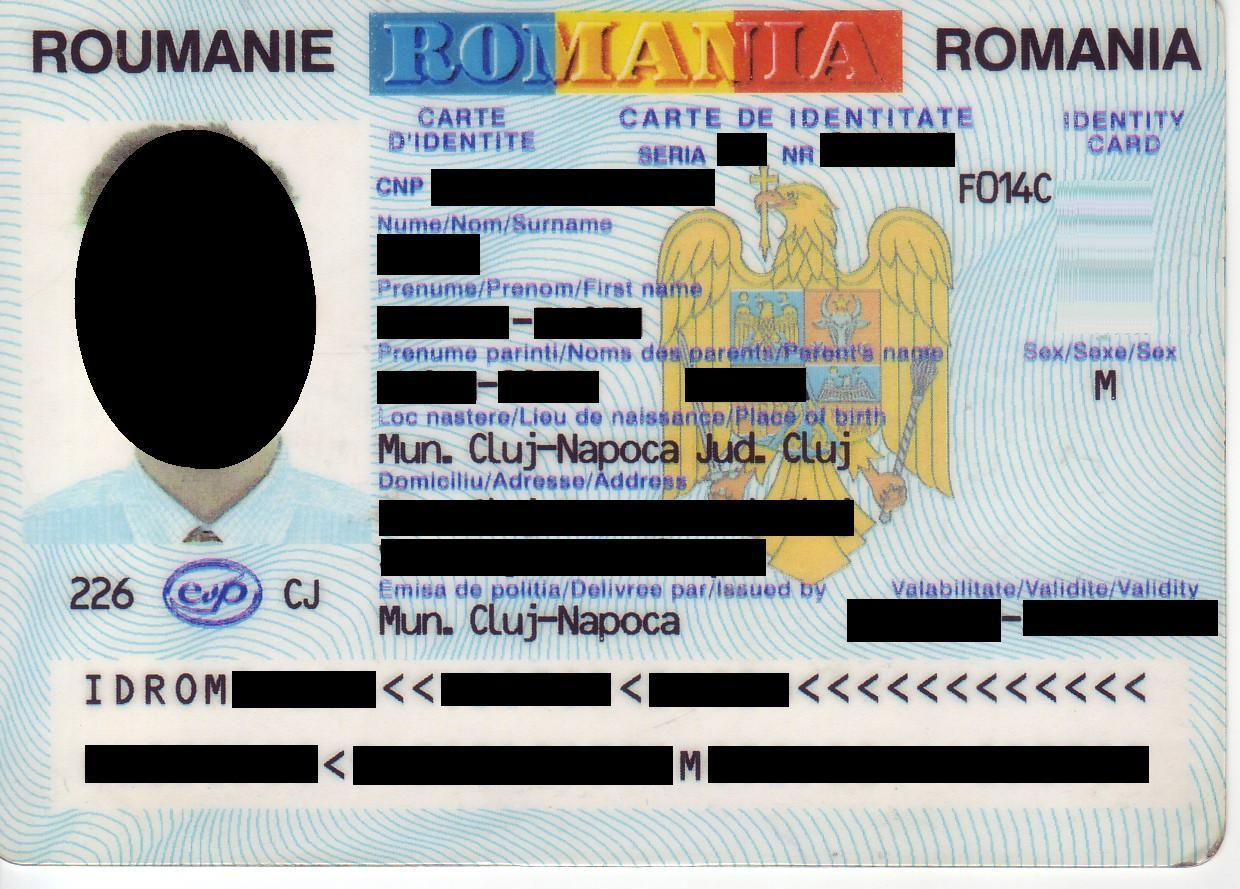
The Romanian identity card. This is the old model, when the country code was ROM and not ROU as in present.

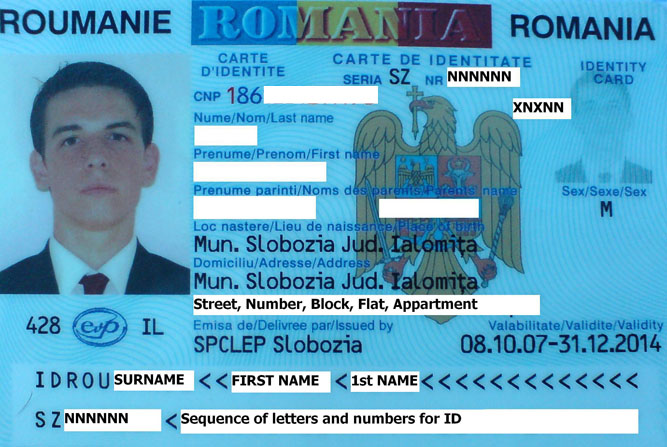
The Romanian identity card. This is the new model, with the country code ROU.

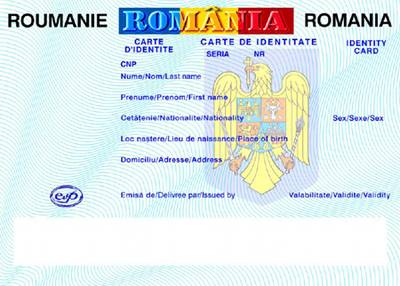
The model issued starting with 2009, that specifies the Romanian citizenship.

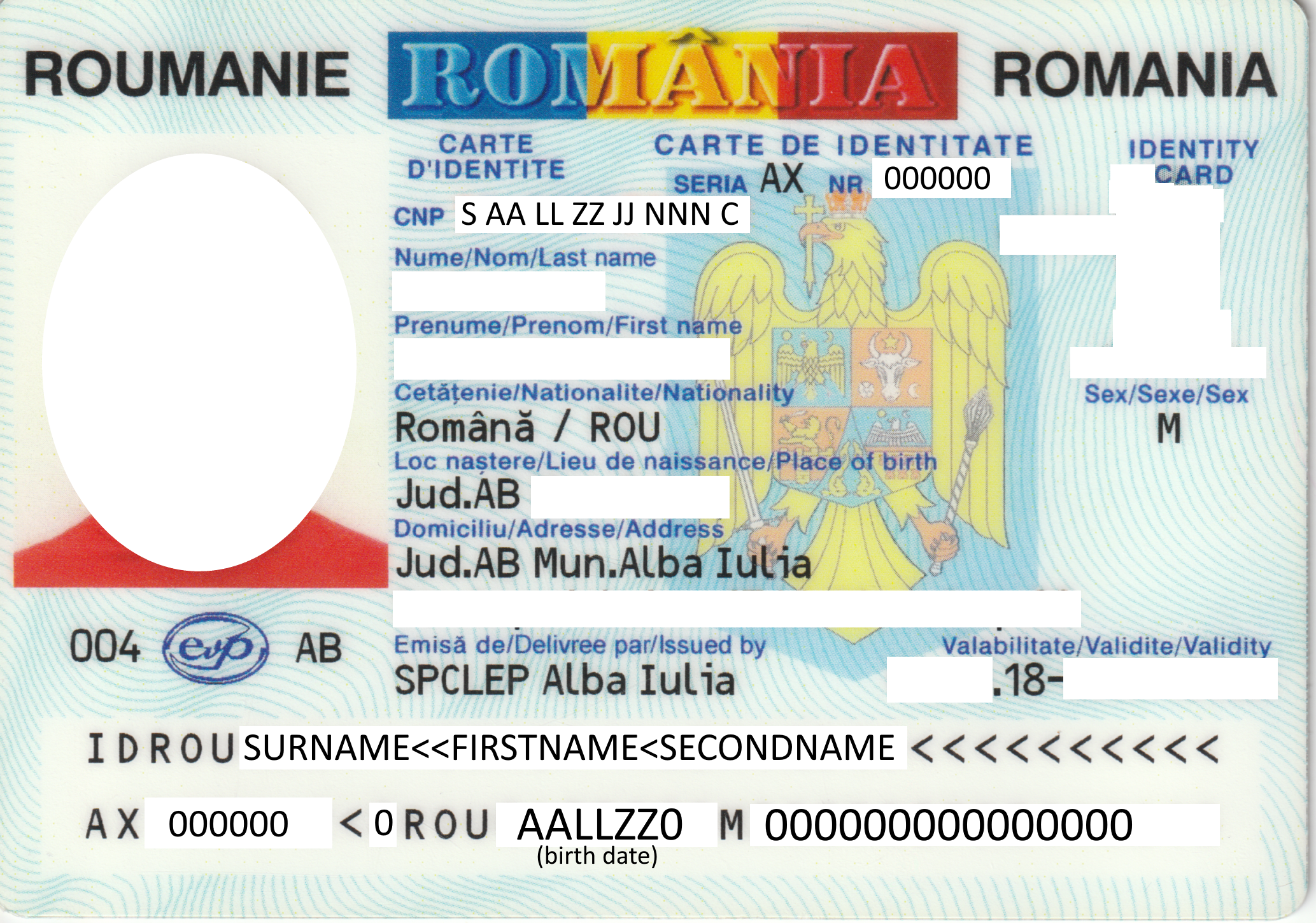
The Romanian identity card. Issued in 2018, this model shows Romania's new coat of arms with the crown on the eagle's head.

== See also ==
- National identity cards in the European Union
- Romanian nationality law
- Romanian passport
- Visa policy of Romania
- Visa requirements for Romanian citizens
