= National Authority for Citizenship (Romania) =

Romanian government agency

- Autoritatea Națională pentru Cetățenie
- Emblem

- Authority headquarters in Bucharest, April 2018

Agency overview
- Formed: February 5, 2010; 16 years ago
- Jurisdiction: Government of Romania
- Headquarters: Bucharest, Romania; 44.43271°N 26.100775°E
- Parent agency: Ministry of Justice
- Website: cetatenie.just.ro

The National Authority for Citizenship (Romanian: Autoritatea Națională pentru Cetățenie, abbreviated ANC) is a Romanian public institution responsible for administering and implementing the legal framework governing Romanian citizenship. It is subordinated to the Ministry of Justice and is the principal administrative body dealing with the acquisition, restoration, renunciation and withdrawal of Romanian citizenship.

== History ==
Between 1991 and 2010, responsibility for administering Romanian citizenship belonged principally to the Ministry of Justice, through the technical secretariat, citizenship commission which operated within the directorate of citizenship.

The National Authority for Citizenship was formally established on 5 February 2010 through Government Emergency Ordinance No. 5/2010, published in the Official Gazette on 10 February 2010 and law No. 112/2010 which approved it with amendments.

The creation of the institution responded to the need to reorganize the administrative system responsible for processing citizenship applications. The government identified the need to improve the efficiency of the Citizenship Commission and ensure compliance with statutory processing deadlines.

The new authority was established as a public institution of national interest, with legal personality, subordinate to the Ministry of Justice. It received its own administrative apparatus and responsibility for coordinating citizenship procedures.

The 2010 reform also provided for the republication of Law No. 21/1991, incorporating the legislative changes and reorganizing the legal provisions governing Romanian citizenship.

== Powers and duties ==
The fundamental mission of the National Authority for Citizenship is to implement the legal procedures governing Romanian citizenship. Its responsibilities encompass the entire administrative process, from the registration and examination of applications to the preparation of decisions and the issuance of citizenship certificates as well as organizes the formal ceremony at which applicants who are legally required to do so swear allegiance to Romania. Among its duties are the following:

- Granting of citizenship
- Restoration and reacquisition of citizenship. A particularly important area of ANC activity is the restoration or reacquisition of Romanian citizenship with the Romanian law providing a legal basis for reacquisition or restoration of Romanian citizenship by certain former Romanian citizens who lost their citizenship against their will or without their own fault, as well as by their descendants, under the conditions specified by law. The Authority examines applications under these provisions, verifies documentary evidence and determines whether the applicant satisfies the statutory requirements.
- Renunciation of Romanian citizenship. The ANC administers applications for voluntary renunciation of Romanian citizenship.
- Withdrawal of Romanian citizenship. The Authority investigates and processes the relevant cases through the Citizenship Commission and the prescribed administrative procedure.

== Structure ==
Its organizational structure is governed by the Ministry of Justice's Regulation of 10 December 2024 and the organizational chart approved by Order No. 1726/C of 24 July 2024. The ANC is headed by a president and two vice presidents. It is divided into a number of directorates and a citizenship commission:

- Citizenship File Resolution Directorate - Examines applications and prepares decisions on citizenship files.
- Applications Registration, Orders and Oaths Directorate - Registers applications and manages citizenship orders and certificates.
- Economic and Administrative Directorate - Manages budgets, procurement, personnel and archives.
- Legal, Litigation and Petitions Service - Handles litigation, legal opinions and petitions.
- Communication, IT, Classified Documents, Registry and Secretariat Service- Manages public information, IT systems, correspondence and records.
- Citizenship Commission
  - Examining applications for Romanian citizenship.
  - Checking whether applicants meet legal requirements.
  - Requesting additional documents when necessary.
  - Conducting interviews or other verification procedures where required.
  - Formulating proposals concerning citizenship applications.

The National Authority for Citizenship has its central office in Bucharest as well as territorial offices in Galați, Iași and Suceava.
