= Ministry of Justice (Romania) =

- Ministerul Justiției
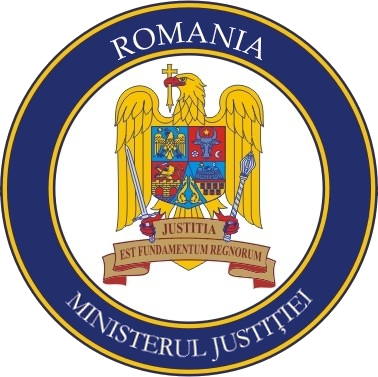
- Emblem

- Ministry headquarters in Bucharest, March 2020

Agency overview
- Formed: 1862
- Jurisdiction: Government of Romania
- Headquarters: Strada Apolodor, nr. 17, Bucharest, Romania; 44.42876°N 26.09168°E
- Minister responsible: Radu Marinescu, Minister of Justice
- Child agency: National Citizenship Authority
- Website: www.just.ro

Ministry of Justice (Romanian: Ministerul Justiției) is the ministry of the Government of Romania responsible for the administration of justice, the development of legal policy, and the coordination of the judicial system. The ministry oversees the functioning of courts, penitentiaries, and legal reforms, while also representing the Romanian state in matters related to judicial cooperation and the rule of law.

The institution is one of the oldest ministries in Romania, originating from the administrative reforms introduced during the nineteenth century in the Romanian Principalities. Since its official establishment in 1862, the Ministry of Justice has played a central role in the modernization of Romanian legislation and judicial institutions.

== History ==
The Ministry of Justice of Romania traces its origins to the first half of the nineteenth century, during the period of administrative modernization in the Romanian Principalities. Under the Organic Regulations adopted in Wallachia (1831) and Moldavia (1832), a separate institution responsible for judicial affairs was established under the name Logofeția Dreptății (transl. Chancellery of Justice). These reforms introduced elements of modern public administration and laid the foundations for an organized judicial system.

Following the unification of Moldavia and Wallachia under Alexandru Ioan Cuza in 1859, the judicial administrations of the two principalities were gradually unified. In 1862, after Bucharest became the capital of the United Principalities, the Ministry of Justice officially emerged as a central institution of the Romanian state. Manolache Costache Epureanu served as the first Minister of Justice.

During the second half of the nineteenth century, the ministry played a central role in the modernization of Romanian legislation. Inspired largely by the French legal model, Romania adopted a Civil Code in 1864, followed by criminal and commercial legislation intended to standardize legal practice throughout the country. The ministry supervised the reorganization of courts, the professionalization of magistrates, and the implementation of legal reforms associated with the consolidation of the modern Romanian state.

After Romania proclaimed independence in 1877 and became a kingdom in 1881, the Ministry of Justice expanded its responsibilities. In addition to overseeing courts and prosecutors, it became involved in prison administration, legal education, and the harmonization of legislation across newly integrated territories after the creation of Greater Romania in 1918. Judicial unification became a major objective during the interwar period, as different legal traditions existed in Transylvania, Bessarabia, and Bukovina.

The role of the ministry changed significantly during after 1948. Judicial institutions became subordinated to the political leadership of the Romanian Communist Party, and the Ministry of Justice was reorganized according to the principles of the socialist legal system. Courts and prosecutors increasingly served political purposes, while judicial independence was substantially reduced. During this period, several legal reforms were adopted to align Romanian legislation with Soviet-inspired models.

Following the Romanian Revolution of December 1989, the Ministry of Justice underwent a broad process of institutional reform. The 1991 Constitution reestablished the principle of judicial independence and separation of powers. Throughout the 1990s and early 2000s, the ministry coordinated reforms aimed at democratizing the judiciary, strengthening the rule of law, and aligning Romanian legislation with European legal standards as part of the country’s accession process to the European Union.

Since Romania joined the European Union in 2007, the Ministry of Justice has continued to focus on judicial modernization, anti-corruption policies, prison reform, and digitalization of judicial services. The institution cooperates with European and international organizations in areas concerning judicial efficiency, legal transparency, and the protection of fundamental rights.

== See also ==
- List of justice ministers of Romania
