= Visa requirements for Romanian citizens =

Administrative entry restrictions

Romanian passport

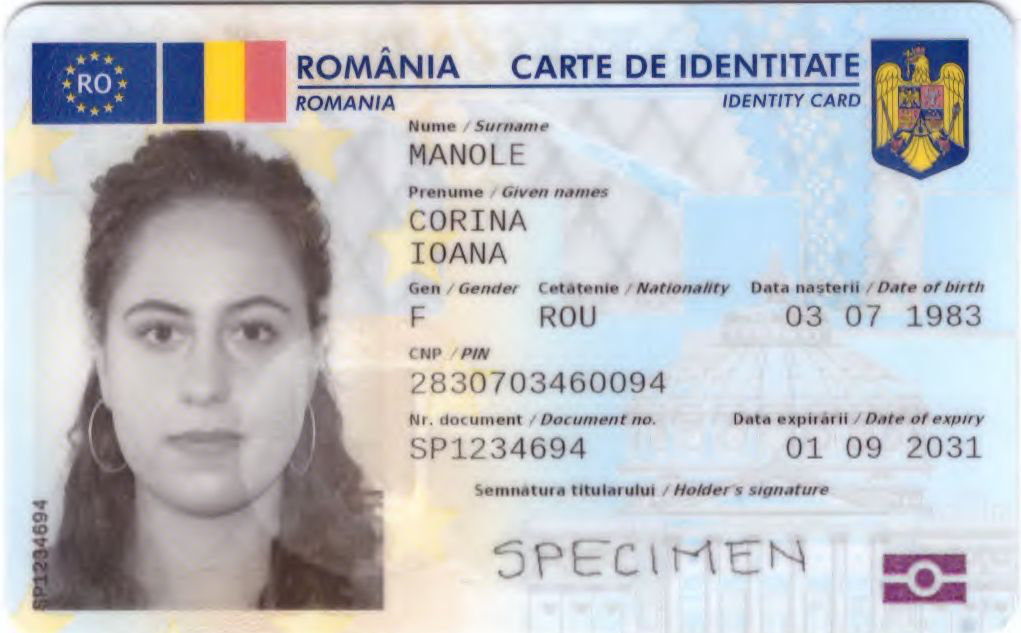
A Romanian identity card is valid for travel to most European countries

Visa requirements for Romanian citizens are the administrative entry restrictions by the authorities of other territories affecting citizens of Romania. As of 2026, Romanian citizens have visa-free or visa on arrival access to 178 countries and territories, ranking the Romanian passport 11th in terms of travel freedom, according to the Henley Passport Index.

== Recent changes ==
Recently visa requirements for Romanian citizens were lifted by Bolivia (December 2025), South Africa (September 2025), Vietnam (August 2025), Lesotho (August 2025), China (November 2024), Thailand (July 2024), Tajikistan (April 2024), Angola (September 2023), Oman (9 December 2020) (Previously Visa on arrival), Uzbekistan (15 January 2019), Cape Verde (1 January 2019), Belarus (February 2017), Solomon Islands (October 2016), Tuvalu (July 2016), Marshall Islands (June 2016), Palau (December 2015), Tonga (November 2015), Sao Tome and Principe (August 2015), Indonesia (June 2015), United Arab Emirates, Timor-Leste, Samoa (May 2015),

Romanian citizens were made eligible for eVisas recently by Ghana (May 2026), Afghanistan (March 2026), Guinea and Malawi (October 2019), Saudi Arabia (September 2019), Russia (August 2022), Pakistan (April 2019), Papua New Guinea (November 2018), Djibouti (February 2018), Egypt (December 2017), Azerbaijan (January 2017), India (e-Tourist visa from November 2014) and Myanmar (September 2014).

== Visa requirements map ==
Visa requirements for Romanian citizens using normal passports Romania - Right of abode Freedom of movement Visa not required / ETA (Note: ETA required for Canada if arriving by air, Kenya, Israel, New Zealand, Saint Kitts and Nevis, Seychelles, Sri Lanka, United Kingdom and the United States and its territories) (Note: Including Australian eVisitor.) Visa on arrival eVisa Visa available both on arrival or online (Note: Including Indonesian e-VOA) Visa required prior to arrival

== Visa requirements ==
Country / Region	Visa requirement	Allowed stay	Notes (excluding departure fees)	Reciprocity
Afghanistan	eVisa	30 days	A visa is not required for individuals born in Afghanistan or for those who can provide proof that one of their parents is an Afghan national or was born in Afghanistan.; e-Visa : Visitors must arrive at Kabul International (KBL).	X
Albania	Visa not required	90 days	ID card valid	✓
Algeria	Visa required		Persons may be denied entry if entering with a passport containing visas or stamps issued by Israel.; Visitors on tours organized to some southern regions by an approved travel agency may obtain a visa on arrival for up to 30 days.	✓
Andorra	Visa not required	90 days	ID card valid.	✓
Angola	Visa not required	30 days	30 days per trip, but no more than 90 days within any 1 calendar year for tourism purposes only.; Visitors must have a return/onward ticket and a hotel reservation confirmation.; An International Certificate of Vaccination is required.	X
Antigua and Barbuda	Visa not required	180 days		✓
Argentina	Visa not required	90 days		✓
Armenia	Visa not required	180 days		X
Australia	eVisitor	90 days	90 days on each visit in 12-month period if granted.; May enter using SmartGate.; Transit without a visa is possible.; Approval rates for Romanian citizens have started to rise this year, but still remain the lowest of the eVisitor programme. In 2026, approximately 20% of applications are rejected.; Proof of employment, retirement, or enrollment in a university is mandatory. In the very likely event of being asked for financial resources, a bank statement from the last 3 months showing at least AUD 5,000 and proof of consistent monthly income is recommended.; If any of these conditions cannot be met, additional documents demonstrating intent to return to the home country are recommended to avoid visa refusal.; It is still generally considered a visa exemption, as 90% of eVisitor visas are automatically granted in less than a day for citizens of other eVisitor-eligible countries, with an overall approval rate of 98%. For Romanian citizens, the automatic grant rate is low, and the overall approval rate, including manually reviewed applications, is around 82%.	✓
Austria	Freedom of movement	ID card valid		✓
Azerbaijan	eVisa	30 days		X
Bahamas	Visa not required	90 days		✓
Bahrain	eVisa / Visa on arrival	30 days	Extendable for an additional 2 weeks.	X
Bangladesh	Visa on arrival	30 days		X
Barbados	Visa not required	90 days		✓
Belarus	Visa not required	90 days	Visa-free until 31 December 2026.	X
Belgium	Freedom of movement	ID card valid		✓
Belize	Visa not required			X
Benin	eVisa	90 days	Must have an international vaccination certificate.; Three types of electronic visa are offered: the e-Visa valid for 30 days for a single entry (50 EUR), the e-Visa valid for 30 days for several (multiple) entries (75 EUR), and the e-Visa valid for 90 days to make several (multiple) entries (100 EUR).	X
Bhutan	eVisa		The Sustainable Development Fee (SDF) of 200 USD per person, per night for almost all visitors to Bhutan. Additionally, if payment is made in US dollars from September 1, 2023 to August 31, 2027, the SDF is 100 USD.	X
Bolivia	Visa not required	90 days		X
Bosnia and Herzegovina	Visa not required	90 days	90 days within any 6-month period.; ID card valid.	✓
Botswana	Visa not required	90 days		X
Brazil	Visa not required	90 days	90 days within any 180-day period.	✓
Brunei	Visa not required	90 days		✓
Bulgaria	Freedom of movement	ID card valid.		✓
Burkina Faso	eVisa	90 days	International Certificate of Vaccination or Prophylaxis required.	X
Burundi	eVisa / Visa on arrival	1 month	From December 2021, passengers of all countries that required visa, can now obtain visa on arrival at Bujumbura International Airport, and all land borders.	X
Cambodia	eVisa / Visa on arrival	30 days	Online visa available.	X
Cameroon	eVisa			X
Canada	eTA / Visa not required	6 months	eTA required if arriving by air.	✓
Cape Verde	Visa not required	30 days	Must register online at least five days prior to arrival.	X
Central African Republic	Visa required			✓
Chad	eVisa	90 days	Must apply at least 7 days before arrival but maximum 90 days before arrival.	X
Chile	Visa not required	90 days		✓
China	Visa not required	30 days	Visa-free from November 30, 2024 to December 31, 2026.; Visa not required for holders of normal Romanian passports endorsed "for public affairs".	X
Colombia	Visa not required	180 days	90 days – extendable up to 180-days stay within a one-year period	✓
Comoros	Visa on arrival	45 days		X
Republic of the Congo	Visa required			✓
Democratic Republic of the Congo	eVisa	7 days		X
Costa Rica	Visa not required	180 days		✓
Côte d'Ivoire	eVisa	90 days	e-Visa holders must arrive via Port Bouet Airport.	X
Croatia	Freedom of movement	ID card valid.		✓
Cuba	eVisa	90 days	Can be extended up to 90 days with a fee.	X
Cyprus	Freedom of movement	ID card valid.		✓
Czech Republic	Freedom of movement	ID card valid.		✓
Denmark	Freedom of movement	ID card valid.		✓
Djibouti	eVisa / Visa on arrival	30 days		X
Dominica	Visa not required	180 days		✓
Dominican Republic	Visa not required	90 days		X
Ecuador	Visa not required	90 days		X
Egypt	eVisa / Visa on arrival	30 days		X
El Salvador	Visa not required	90 days		✓
Equatorial Guinea	eVisa		e-Visa holders must arrive via Malabo International Airport.	X
Eritrea	Visa required			✓
Estonia	Freedom of movement	ID card valid.		✓
Eswatini	Visa not required	30 days		X
Ethiopia	eVisa / Visa on arrival	up to 90 days	Visa on arrival is obtainable only at Addis Ababa Bole International Airport.; e-Visa holders must arrive via Addis Ababa Bole International Airport.; e-Visa is available for 30 or 90 days.	X
Fiji	Visa not required	120 days		X
Finland	Freedom of movement	ID card valid.		✓
France	Freedom of movement	ID card valid.		✓
Gabon	eVisa	90 days	e-Visa holders must arrive via Libreville International Airport.	X
Gambia	Visa not required	90 days		X
Georgia	Visa not required	1 year	ID card valid.	✓
Germany	Freedom of movement	ID card valid.		✓
Ghana	eVisa	90 days		X
Greece	Freedom of movement	ID card valid.		✓
Grenada	Visa not required	90 days		✓
Guatemala	Visa not required	90 days		✓
Guinea	eVisa	90 days		X
Guinea-Bissau	Visa on arrival	90 days		X
Guyana	eVisa		An eVisa(Approval letter) can only be obtained after contacting the Department of Immigration and Citizenship by phone. Payment is done upon arrival.	X
Haiti	Visa not required	90 days		X
Honduras	Visa not required	90 days		✓
Hungary	Freedom of movement	ID card valid.		✓
Iceland	Freedom of movement	ID card valid.		✓
India	eVisa	30 days	e-Visa holders must arrive via 32 designated airports (Note: Ahmedabad; Amritsar; Bagdogra; Bengaluru; Bhubaneswar; Chandigarh; Chennai; Coimbatore; Delhi; Gaya; Goa-Dabolim; Goa-Manohar; Guwahati; Hyderabad; Indore; Jaipur; Kannur; Kochi; Kolkata; Kozhikode; Lucknow; Madurai; Mangaluru; Mumbai; Nagpur; Port Blair; Pune; Surat; Thiruvananthapuram; Tiruchirappalli; Varanasi; Visakhapatnam) or 5 designated seaports. (Note: Chennai; Cochin; Mormugao; Mumbai; Mangalore); An Indian e-Tourist Visa may only be obtained twice within 1 calendar year.; Foreigners of Pakistani origin or who hold a Pakistani Passport are not eligible for an e-Visa. Foreigners who are not Pakistani nationals, but whose parents or grandparents (either paternal or maternal) were born in, or were permanent residents in Pakistan, are also not eligible for an e-Visa.	X
Indonesia	e-VOA / Visa on arrival	30 days		X
Iran	eVisa	30 days	Passengers who have already made an application, at least two days before arrival, at the Iranian Ministry of Foreign Affair's E-Visa website and present the submission notification at the airport's visa desk may obtain a visa on arrival.	X
Iraq	eVisa	60 days	Visa on arrival or eVisa for up to 30 days for travel to Iraqi Kurdistan.	X
Ireland	Freedom of movement	ID card valid		✓
Israel	ETA-IL	90 days	Starting 1 January 2025, an ETA is required	✓
Italy	Freedom of movement	ID card valid		✓
Jamaica	Visa on arrival		At the price of US$100.	X
Japan	Visa not required	90 days		✓
Jordan	eVisa / Visa on arrival	30 days	Conditions apply.; Visa can be obtained upon arrival, it will cost a total of 40 JOD, obtainable at most international ports of entry and land border crossings. (except King Hussein/Allenby Bridge)	X
Kazakhstan	Visa not required	30 days		X
Kenya	Electronic Travel Authorisation	90 days	Applications can be submitted up to 90 days prior to travel and must be submitted at least 3 days in advance.; eTA fee is 32.50 USD.; Proof of reservation at the hotel where visitors plan to stay is required (if staying with friends, an invitation letter is also acceptable).; Yellow fever vaccination certificate is required if coming from endemic countries.	X
Kiribati	Visa not required	90 days	90 days within any 180-day period	✓
North Korea	Visa required			✓
South Korea	Visa not required	90 days	K-ETA exemption until the end of 2026.	✓
Kuwait	eVisa / Visa on arrival	90 days	Online visa available (eVisa).	X
Kyrgyzstan	Visa not required	60 days		X
Laos	eVisa / Visa on arrival	30 days	18 (Note: Savannakhet Airport; Lanetoui - Mengkang (China); Meuangmom - Wan Pong (Myanmar); Banvang - Ban Khok Phai (Thailand); Namngeun - Huay Kon (Thailand); Paksan - Bueng Kan (Thailand); Paktaphan - Pak Saeng (Thailand); Pangmon - Ban Huak (Thailand); Phoudou (Thailand); Dak ta ock - Nam Giang (Vietnam); La Lai (Vietnam); Namkan (Vietnam); Namphao - Cau Treo (Vietnam); Namsoy - Na Meo (Vietnam); Naphao - Cha Lo (Vietnam); Pahang - Long Sap (Vietnam); Panghok - Tây Trang (Vietnam); Phoukeua - Bo Y (Vietnam)) of the 33 border crossings are only open to regular visa holders.; e-Visa may be used to enter Laos through the Luang Prabang, Pakse and Vientiane international airports, 3 Thai-Lao Friendship Bridges (Note: Vientiane (Friendship Bridge 1); Savannakhet (Friendship Bridge 2); Bokeo (Friendship Bridge 4)), in Boten (road and railroad), and in Vientiane (at Khamsavath railway station).; Visa on arrival is available at the Luang Prabang, Pakse and Vientiane international airports, 4 Thai-Lao Friendship Bridges (Note: Vientiane (Friendship Bridge 1); Savannakhet (Friendship Bridge 2); Khammouane (Friendship Bridge 3); Bokeo (Friendship Bridge 4)) and 7 border crossings. (Note: Nongnokkheane - Trapeang Kriel (Cambodia); Boten - Bo han (China); Golden Triangle/Samliemkham (Thailand); Khamsavath railway station (Thailand); Namheuang - Ban Na Kraseng (Thailand); Vang tao - Chongmek (Thailand); Dansavan - Lao Bảo (Vietnam))	X
Latvia	Freedom of movement	ID card valid		✓
Lebanon	Visa on arrival	1 month	Extendable for 2 additional months.; Granted free of charge at Beirut International Airport or any other port of entry if there is no Israeli visa or seal, holding a telephone number, an address in Lebanon, and a non-refundable return or circle trip ticket.	X
Lesotho	Visa not required	14 days		X
Liberia	eVisa	90 days	The Liberia Visa on Arrival (VoA) allows travelers to obtain a Visa upon arrival in Liberia by plane. Travelers must pre-apply for the visa online.	X
Libya	eVisa	30 days	Independent travel is not permitted, and visitors must organize their visit through a tour guide. A tourist police escort is required at all times.; An eVisa will not be granted without a sponsor or tour agency.; A security letter issued by the Libyan Immigration Authorities may also be required.; Holders of passports containing an Israeli stamp or visa will be refused entry in Libya.	X
Liechtenstein	Freedom of movement	ID card valid		✓
Lithuania	Freedom of movement	ID card valid		✓
Luxembourg	Freedom of movement	ID card valid		✓
Madagascar	eVisa / Visa on arrival	60 days		X
Malawi	eVisa / Visa on arrival	90 days		X
Malaysia	Visa not required	90 days	The electronic Malaysia Digital Arrival Card must be submitted within three days before the date of arrival in Malaysia.	✓
Maldives	Visa on arrival	30 days		X
Mali	Visa required			✓
Malta	Freedom of movement	ID card valid		✓
Marshall Islands	Visa not required	90 days	90 days within any 180-day period.	✓
Mauritania	eVisa	30 days	An eVisa is mandatory before travel.	X
Mauritius	Visa not required	90 days		✓
Mexico	Visa not required	180 days		✓
Micronesia	Visa not required	90 days	90 days within any 180-day period.	✓
Moldova	Visa not required	90 days	90 days within any 180-day period.; ID card valid.	✓
Monaco	Visa not required	90 days	90 days within any 6-month period.; ID card valid.	✓
Mongolia	Visa not required	30 days	The Ministry of Foreign Affairs of Mongolia has exempted visas for 34 countries from January 2023 to December 2026.	X
Montenegro	Visa not required	90 days	90 days within any 6-month period.; ID card valid for 30 days.	✓
Morocco	Visa not required	90 days		X
Mozambique	eVisa / Visa on arrival	30 days		X
Myanmar	eVisa	28 days	eVisa holders must arrive via Yangon, Nay Pyi Taw or Mandalay airports or via land border crossings with Thailand — Tachileik, Myawaddy and Kawthaung or India — Rih Khaw Dar and Tamu.; eVisa available for both tourism (allowed stay is 28 days) or business (allowed stay is 70 days) purposes.	X
Namibia	eVisa / Visa on arrival	3 months	Can be obtained online or on arrival for a fee of N$1,600 (approximately €82 / US$88).	X
Nauru	Visa required			✓
Nepal	eVisa / Visa on arrival	90 days		X
Netherlands	Freedom of movement	Freedom of movement. (European Netherlands); ID card valid .		✓
New Zealand	NZeTA	90 days	International Visitor Conservation and Tourism Levy must be paid upon requesting an Electronic Travel Authority.; May enter using eGate.; Holders of an Australian Permanent Resident Visa or Resident Return Visa may be granted a New Zealand Resident Visa on arrival permitting indefinite stay (pursuant to the Trans-Tasman Travel Arrangement), subject to meeting character requirements and obtaining an Electronic Travel Authority prior to departure. Such travellers are not required to pay the International Visitor Conservation and Tourism Levy.	✓
Nicaragua	Visa not required	90 days		✓
Niger	Visa required			✓
Nigeria	eVisa	90 days	Holders of written e-Visa approval issued by the Immigration Authority can obtain a visa on arrival, provided they hold a visa application form and e-Visa application payment receipt and have an invitation letter from a Nigerian company accepting immigration responsibilities.	X
North Macedonia	Visa not required	90 days	90 days within any 6-month period.; ID card valid.	✓
Norway	Freedom of movement	ID card valid .		✓
Oman	Visa not required	14 days	An e-Visa is also available for stays up to 30 days.; Must present proof of a confirmed hotel reservation, health insurance, and a return ticket.	X
Pakistan	eVisa	90 days	Issued in 7–10 business days.	X
Palau	Visa not required	90 days	90 days within any 180-day period.	✓
Panama	Visa not required	90 days		✓
Papua New Guinea	eVisa	60 days	Visa on Arrival is currently suspended.; Available at Gurney Airport (Alotau), Mount Hagen Airport, Port Moresby Airport and Tokua Airport (Rabaul).	X
Paraguay	Visa not required	90 days		✓
Peru	Visa not required	90 days	90 days within any 6-month period.	✓
Philippines	Visa not required	30 days		X
Poland	Freedom of movement	ID card valid		✓
Portugal	Freedom of movement	ID card valid		✓
Qatar	Visa not required	90 days		X
Russia	eVisa	30 days	e-Visa holders must arrive and departure via approved checkpoints	X
Rwanda	Visa not required	30 days		X
Saint Kitts and Nevis	ETA	90 days	All travelers must apply for an ETA online.	✓
Saint Lucia	Visa not required	90 days	90 days within any 180-day period.	✓
Saint Vincent and the Grenadines	Visa not required	90 days	90 days within any 180-day period.	✓
Samoa	Visa not required	90 days	90 days within any 180-day period.	✓
San Marino	Visa not required	20 days	ID card valid.	✓
São Tomé and Príncipe	Visa not required	15 days		X
Saudi Arabia	eVisa / Visa on arrival	90 days	96 hour transit visa available additionally.	X
Senegal	Visa not required	90 days		X
Serbia	Visa not required	90 days	90 days within any 6-month period.; ID card valid.	✓
Seychelles	ETA	90 days	Travelers must obtain an ETA before departure.	✓
Sierra Leone	eVisa / Visa on arrival	30 days		X
Singapore	Visa not required	90 days		✓
Slovakia	Freedom of movement	ID card valid		✓
Slovenia	Freedom of movement	ID card valid		✓
Solomon Islands	Visa not required	90 days	90 days within any 180-day period	✓
Somalia	eVisa	30 days	All visitors must have an approved Electronic Visa (eTAS) before the start of their journey.	X
South Africa	Visa not required	90 days		X
South Sudan	eVisa	6 months	Obtainable online 30 days single entry for 100 USD, 90 days multiple entry for 200 USD and 180 days multiple entry for 350 USD.; Printed visa authorization must be presented at the time of travel.	X
Spain	Freedom of movement	ID card valid.		✓
Sri Lanka	Electronic Travel Authorisation	30 days	Sri Lanka introduced an ETA valid for 30 days.	X
Sudan	Visa required			✓
Suriname	Visa not required	90 days	An entrance fee of 50 USD or 50 Euros must be paid online prior to arrival.; Multiple entry eVisa is also available.	X
Sweden	Freedom of movement	ID card valid.		✓
Switzerland	Freedom of movement	ID card valid.		✓
Syria	eVisa / Visa on arrival	30 days		X
Tajikistan	Visa not required	30 days	Visas are also available online.	X
Tanzania	Visa not required	90 days		X
Thailand	Visa not required	60 days		X
Timor-Leste	Visa not required	90 days		✓
Togo	eVisa	15 days		X
Tonga	Visa not required	90 days		✓
Trinidad and Tobago	Visa not required	90 days		✓
Tunisia	Visa not required	3 months		X
Turkey	Visa not required	90 days	ID card valid.	X
Turkmenistan	Visa required		10-day visa on arrival if holding a letter of invitation provided by a company registered in Turkmenistan with a prior approval from the Foreign Ministry. Visitors can apply to extend their stay for an additional 10 days.; When transiting between two non-bordering countries, visitors can obtain a Turkmenistan transit visa for a five-day stay. This must be applied for in advance at the Turkmenistan Embassy. Visitors must also submit copies of the visas for the country of entry into Turkmenistan and the country of departure from Turkmenistan. Visa fee is 20 USD.	✓
Tuvalu	Visa not required	90 days	90 days within any 180-day period.	✓
Uganda	eVisa	3 months		X
Ukraine	Visa not required	90 days	90 days within any 180-day period.	✓
United Arab Emirates	Visa not required	90 days	90 days within any 180-day period.	✓
United Kingdom	ETA UK	6 months	ETA UK (valid for 2 years when issued) required from 2 April 2025.; Adults can use ePassport gates.	✓
United States	Visa required		Romania's entry into the VWP is suspended until further notice.; ESTA is valid for 2 years from the date of issuance.; ESTA is also required when entering the country by cruise ship or land.; A Form I-94 is required for entry into the United States by land. It carries a $30 fee and can be obtained either online or upon arrival.; Visa required for nationals of VWP countries who have travelled or been present in Iran, Iraq, Libya, North Korea, Somalia, Sudan, Syria or Yemen at any time on or after 1 March 2011 or Cuba at any time on or after 12 January 2021, or nationals of VWP countries who are also nationals of Iran, Iraq, North Korea, Sudan or Syria. Exceptions apply if the travel was in military or diplomatic service of the VWP country.	X
Uruguay	Visa not required	90 days		✓
Uzbekistan	Visa not required	30 days		X
Vanuatu	Visa not required	90 days	90 days within any 180-day period.	X
Vatican City	Visa not required		ID card valid	✓
Venezuela	Visa not required	90 days		✓
Vietnam	Visa not required	45 days	A single entry e-Visa valid for 90 days is also available.	X
Yemen	Visa required		Yemen introduced an e-Visa system for visitors who meet certain eligibility requirements (group travel of 10 or more people, business trips, and transit etc.).	✓
Zambia	Visa not required	90 days		X
Zimbabwe	eVisa / Visa on arrival	1 month (extendable to 3 months)		X

== Dependent, disputed or unrecognized territories ==
=== Unrecognized or partially recognized countries ===
Visitor to	Visa requirement	Allowed stay	Notes (excluding departure fees)
Europe
Abkhazia	Visa required		
Mount Athos	Special permit required	4 days	Special permit required (25 euro for Orthodox visitors, 35 euro for non-Orthodox visitors, 18 euro for students). There is a visitors' quota: maximum 100 Orthodox and 10 non-Orthodox per day and women are not allowed.
(Belarus) Brest and Grodno	Visa not required	Visa-free for 10 days	
Northern Cyprus	Visa not required	3 months	ID card valid.
(United Nations) UN Buffer Zone in Cyprus	Access Permit required		Access Permit is required for travelling inside the zone, except Civil Use Areas.
Faroe Islands	Visa not required	90 days	ID card valid.
Gibraltar	Visa not required	6 months	ID card valid.
Guernsey	Visa not required	6 months	
Jersey	Visa not required	6 months	
Isle of Man	Visa not required	6 months	
(Norway) Jan Mayen	Permit required		Permit issued by the local police required for staying for less than 24 hours and permit issued by the Norwegian police for staying for more than 24 hours.
Kosovo	Visa not required	90 days	ID card valid
Russia	Special authorization required		Several closed cities and regions in Russia require special authorization.
South Ossetia	Russian multiple entry visa required		Multiple entry visa to Russia and three-day prior notification are required to enter South Ossetia.
Transnistria	Visa not required	24 hours	Registration required after 24h.
Africa
British Indian Ocean Territory	Special permit required		Special permit required.
Eritrea outside Asmara	Travel permit required		To travel in the rest of the country, a Travel Permit for Foreigners is required (20 Eritrean nakfa).
(Spain) Canary Islands	Visa not required	Freedom of movement.; ID card valid	
(Portugal) Madeira	Visa not required	Freedom of movement.; ID card valid	
Mayotte	Visa not required	Freedom of movement.; ID card valid	
Réunion	Visa not required	Freedom of movement.; ID card valid	
Ascension Island	eVisa	3 months within any year period.	
Saint Helena	Visitor's Pass on arrival		Visitor's Pass granted on arrival valid for 4/10/21/60/90 days for 12/14/16/20/25 pound sterling.
Tristan da Cunha	Permission required		Permission to land required for 15/30 pounds sterling (yacht/ship passenger) for Tristan da Cunha Island or 20 pounds sterling for Gough Island, Inaccessible Island or Nightingale Islands.
Sahrawi Arab Democratic Republic	Visa not required	90 days	Same visa regime as Morocco.
Somaliland	Visa on arrival	30 days for 30 US dollars, payable on arrival.	
Sudan	Travel permit required		All foreigners traveling more than 25 kilometers outside of Khartoum must obtain a travel permit.
(Sudan) Darfur	Travel permit required		Separate travel permit is required.
Asia
(China) Hainan	Visa not required	30 days	Individual tourists need to select a tour agency and inform them their schedule.
Hong Kong	Visa not required	90 days	
India PAP/RAP	PAP/RAP required		Protected Area Permit (PAP) required for whole states of Nagaland and Sikkim and parts of states Manipur, Arunachal Pradesh, Uttaranchal, Jammu and Kashmir, Rajasthan, Himachal Pradesh. Restricted Area Permit (RAP) required for all of Andaman and Nicobar Islands and parts of Sikkim. Some of these requirements are occasionally lifted for a year.
Iraqi Kurdistan	Visa on arrival	15 days	Visa on arrival is available at Erbil and Sulaymaniyah airports.
Kazakhstan	Special permission required		Special permission required for the town of Baikonur and surrounding areas in Kyzylorda Oblast, and the town of Gvardeyskiy near Almaty.
(Iran) Kish Island	Visa not required		Visitors to Kish Island do not require a visa.
Macao	Visa not required	90 days	
(Malaysia) Sabah and Sarawak	Visa not required		These states have their own immigration authorities and passport is required to travel to them, however the same visa applies.
North Korea outside Pyongyang	Special permit required		People are not allowed to leave the capital city, tourists can only leave the capital with a governmental tourist guide (no independent moving)
Palestine	Visa not required		Arrival by sea to Gaza Strip not allowed.
Taiwan	Visa not required	90 days	
(Tajikistan) Gorno-Badakhshan Autonomous Province	OVIR permit required		OVIR permit required, can be obtained with e-visa application for an additional 20 USD. Locally it may be obtained for 15+5 Tajikistani Somoni. Another special permit (free of charge) is required for Lake Sarez.
(China) Tibet Autonomous Region	TTP required		Tibet Travel Permit required (10 US Dollars).
Turkmenistan	Special permit required		A special permit, issued prior to arrival by Ministry of Foreign Affairs, is required if visiting the following places: Atamurat, Cheleken, Dashoguz, Serakhs and Serhetabat.
(United Nations) Korean Demilitarized Zone	Restricted zone		
(United Nations) UNDOF Zone and Ghajar	Restricted zone		
(Vietnam) Phú Quốc	Visa not required	30 days	
Yemen	Special permission required		Special permission needed for travel outside Sanaa or Aden.
Caribbean and North Atlantic
(Portugal) Azores	Visa not required	Freedom of movement.; ID card valid	
Anguilla	Visa not required	3 months	
Aruba	Visa not required	30 days, extendable to 180 days	
Bermuda	Visa not required	Up to 6 months, decided on arrival.	
(Netherlands) Bonaire, St. Eustatius and Saba	Visa not required	3 months	
British Virgin Islands	Visa not required	30 days, extensions possible	
Cayman Islands	Visa not required	6 months	
Curacao	Visa not required	3 months	
Greenland	Visa not required	90 days	
Guadeloupe	Visa not required	Freedom of movement; ID card valid	
Martinique	Visa not required	Freedom of movement; ID card valid	
Montserrat	Visa not required	6 months	ID card valid (max. 14 days).
Puerto Rico	ESTA	90 days (same as US)	
Saint Barthélemy	Visa not required		ID card valid
Saint Martin	Visa not required	Freedom of movement; ID card valid	
Saint Pierre and Miquelon	Visa not required		ID card valid
(Colombia) San Andrés and Leticia	Tourist card on arrival		Visitors arriving at Gustavo Rojas Pinilla International Airport and Alfredo Vásquez Cobo International Airport must buy tourist cards on arrival.
Sint Maarten	Visa not required	3 months	
Turks and Caicos Islands	Visa not required	90 days	
U.S. Virgin Islands	ESTA	90 days (same as US)	
Oceania
American Samoa	Visa required		
(Australia) Ashmore and Cartier Islands	Special authorisation required		Special authorisation required.
(France) Clipperton Island	Special permit required		Special permit required.
Cook Islands	Visa not required	31 days	
(Fiji) Lau Province	Special permission required		Special permission required.
Guam	ESTA	90 days (same as US)	
New Caledonia	Visa not required		ID card valid
Niue	Visa not required	30 days	
Northern Mariana Islands	ESTA	90 days	Visa not required under the Visa Waiver Program ESTA required.
Pitcairn Islands	Visa not required	14 days	Landing fee 35 USD or tax of 5 USD if not going ashore.
(France) French Polynesia	Visa not required		ID card valid
Tokelau	Entry permit required		
United States Minor Outlying Islands	Special permits required		Special permits required for Baker Island, Howland Island, Jarvis Island, Johnston Atoll, Kingman Reef, Midway Atoll, Palmyra Atoll and Wake Island.
Wallis and Futuna	Visa not required		ID card valid
South America
French Guiana	Visa not required	Freedom of movement.; ID card valid	
Galápagos	Online pre-registration required		Online pre-registration is required. Transit Control Card must also be obtained at the airport prior to departure.
South Atlantic and Antarctica
Falkland Islands	Visa not required	1 month	A visitor permit is normally issued as a stamp in the passport on arrival, The maximum validity period is 1 month.
South Georgia and the South Sandwich Islands	Permit required		Pre-arrival permit from the Commissioner required (72 hours/1 month for 110/160 pounds sterling).
Antarctica	Permit required		Special permits required for British Antarctic Territory, French Southern and Antarctic Lands, Argentine Antarctica, (Australia) Australian Antarctic Territory, (Antártica Chilena Province) Chilean Antarctic Territory, (Australia) Heard Island and McDonald Islands, (Norway) Peter I Island, (Norway) Queen Maud Land, (New Zealand) Ross Dependency.

== Non-ordinary passports ==
Holders of various categories of official Romanian passports have additional visa-free access to the following countries:

- Algeria: diplomatic or service passports
- Azerbaijan: diplomatic or service passports
- Cambodia: diplomatic or service passports
- Egypt: diplomatic or service passports
- Ghana: diplomatic, official or service passports
- India: diplomatic passports
- Indonesia: diplomatic, official or service passports
- Iran: diplomatic passports
- Kuwait: diplomatic, official or service passports
- Mauritania: diplomatic or service passports
- Pakistan: diplomatic or official passports
- Russia: diplomatic and service passports
- Sri Lanka: diplomatic passports
- Turkmenistan: diplomatic or service passports

Holders of diplomatic or service passports of any country have visa-free access to Cape Verde, Ethiopia, Mali and Zimbabwe.

== Non-visa restrictions ==
A Romanian identity card is valid for travel to most of the European countries

=== Blank passport pages ===
Many countries require a minimum number of blank pages to be available in the passport being presented, typically one or two pages. Endorsement pages, which often appear after the visa pages, are not counted as being valid or available.

=== Vaccination ===
Cover of the new International Certificate of Vaccination issued by the Bureau of Quarantine in the Philippines since 2021

The African countries of Angola, Benin, Burkina Faso, Burundi, Cameroon, Central African Republic, Democratic Republic of the Congo, Republic of the Congo, Côte d'Ivoire, Gabon, Ghana, Guinea-Bissau, Mali, Niger, Sierra Leone and Togo, South Sudan and Uganda, along with French Guiana in South America, require all incoming passengers older than nine months to one year, to have a current International Certificate of Vaccination or Prophylaxis.

Some other countries require vaccination only if the passenger is coming from an infected area or has visited one recently or has transited for 12 hours in those countries: Algeria, Botswana, Cabo Verde, Chad, Djibouti, Egypt, Eswatini, Ethiopia, Gambia, Ghana, Guinea, Lesotho, Libya, Equatorial Guinea, Eritrea, Madagascar, Malawi, Mauritania, Mauritius, Mozambique, Namibia, Nigeria, Papua New Guinea, Seychelles, Somalia, South Africa, Sudan, Tunisia, Uganda, Tanzania, Zambia and Zimbabwe.

=== Passport validity length ===
Very few countries, such as Paraguay, just require a valid passport on arrival.

However many countries and groupings now require only an identity card – especially from their neighbours. Other countries may have special bilateral arrangements that depart from the generality of their passport validity length policies to shorten the period of passport validity required for each other's citizens or even accept passports that have already expired (but not been cancelled).

Some countries, such as Japan, Ireland and the United Kingdom, require a passport valid throughout the period of the intended stay.

In the absence of specific bilateral agreements, countries requiring passports to be valid for at least 6 more months on arrival include Afghanistan, Algeria, Anguilla, Bahrain, Bhutan, Botswana, British Virgin Islands, Brunei, Cambodia, Cameroon, Cape Verde, Cayman Islands, Central African Republic, Chad, Comoros, Costa Rica, Côte d'Ivoire, Curaçao, Ecuador, Egypt, El Salvador, Equatorial Guinea, Fiji, Gabon, Guinea Bissau, Guyana, Haiti, India, Indonesia, Iran, Iraq, Israel, Jordan, Kenya, Kiribati, Kuwait, Laos, Madagascar, Malaysia, Marshall Islands, Mongolia, Myanmar, Namibia, Nepal, Nicaragua, Nigeria, Oman, Palau, Papua New Guinea, Peru, Philippines, Qatar, Rwanda, Samoa, Saudi Arabia, Singapore, Solomon Islands, Somalia, Sri Lanka, Sudan, Suriname, Tanzania, Thailand, Timor-Leste, Tokelau, Tonga, Turkey, Tuvalu, Uganda, United Arab Emirates, Vanuatu, Venezuela, and Vietnam.

Countries requiring passports valid for at least 4 months on arrival include Micronesia and Zambia.

Countries requiring passports with a validity of at least 3 months beyond the date of intended departure include Azerbaijan, Bosnia and Herzegovina, Honduras, Montenegro, Nauru, Moldova and New Zealand. Similarly, the EEA countries of Iceland, Liechtenstein, Norway, all European Union countries (except Ireland) together with Switzerland also require 3 months validity beyond the date of the bearer's intended departure unless the bearer is an EEA or Swiss national.

Countries requiring passports valid for at least 3 months on arrival include Albania, North Macedonia, Panama, and Senegal.

Bermuda requires passports to be valid for at least 45 days upon entry.

Countries that require a passport validity of at least one month beyond the date of intended departure include Eritrea, Hong Kong, Lebanon, Macau, the Maldives and South Africa.

==== Maximum passport age ====
Countries of the Schengen area require non-EU passports to be less than 10 years old upon entry.

=== Criminal record ===
Some countries, including Australia, Canada, Fiji, New Zealand and the United States, routinely deny entry to non-citizens who have a criminal record, while others impose restrictions depending on the type of conviction and the length of the sentence.

=== Persona non grata ===
The government of a country can declare a diplomat persona non grata, banning them from entering the country or expelling them if they have already entered. In non-diplomatic use, the authorities of a country may also declare a foreigner persona non grata permanently or temporarily, usually because of unlawful activity.

=== Israeli stamps ===
Kuwait, Lebanon, Libya, and Yemen do not allow entry to people with passport stamps from Israel or whose passports have either a used or an unused Israeli visa, or where there is evidence of previous travel to Israel such as entry or exit stamps from neighbouring border posts in transit countries such as Jordan and Egypt.

To circumvent this Arab League boycott of Israel, the Israeli immigration services have now mostly ceased to stamp foreign nationals' passports on either entry to or exit from Israel (unless the entry is for some work-related purposes). Since 15 January 2013, Israel no longer stamps foreign passports at Ben Gurion Airport. Passports are still (as of 22 June 2017) stamped at Erez when passing into and out of Gaza.

Iran refuses admission to holders of passports containing an Israeli visa or stamp that is less than 12 months old.

=== Biometrics ===
Several countries mandate that all travellers, or all foreign travellers, be fingerprinted on arrival and will refuse admission to or even arrest travellers who refuse to comply. In some countries, such as the United States, this may apply even to transit passengers who merely wish to change planes rather than go landside.

Fingerprinting countries/regions include Afghanistan, Argentina, Brunei, Cambodia, China, Ethiopia, Ghana, Guinea, India, Japan, Kenya (both fingerprints and a photo are taken), Malaysia upon entry and departure, Mongolia, Saudi Arabia, the Schengen Area, Singapore, South Korea, Taiwan, Thailand, Uganda, the United Arab Emirates and the United States.

Many countries also require a photo be taken of people entering the country. The United States, which does not fully implement exit control formalities at its land frontiers (although long mandated by its own legislation), intends to implement facial recognition for passengers departing from international airports to identify people who overstay their visa.

Together with fingerprint and face recognition, iris scanning is one of three biometric identification technologies internationally standardised since 2006 by the International Civil Aviation Organization (ICAO) for use in e-passports and the United Arab Emirates conducts iris scanning on visitors who need to apply for a visa. The United States Department of Homeland Security has announced plans to greatly increase the biometric data it collects at US borders. In 2018, Singapore began trials of iris scanning at three land and maritime immigration checkpoints.

== Statistics ==
=== Foreign travel by Romanians ===
These were the numbers of Romanian visitors to various countries in 2014:

Foreign travel statistics
Destination	Number of visitors
Austria	264,704
Belgium	41,630
Bulgaria	1,439,853
Croatia	63,000
Cyprus	18,161
Greece	543,360
Hungary (Note: Counting only visitors staying overnight in official accommodation.)	230,436
Macedonia	7,142
Moldova	22,624
Montenegro	16,112
New Zealand	1,188
Poland	38,112
Russia	30,886
Serbia	36,959
Seychelles (Note: Data for 2015)	942
Slovakia	22,756
Slovenia	25,730
Turkey	426,585
Ukraine	584,774
United Kingdom	471,411
United States	71,923

== Right to consular protection in non-EU countries ==
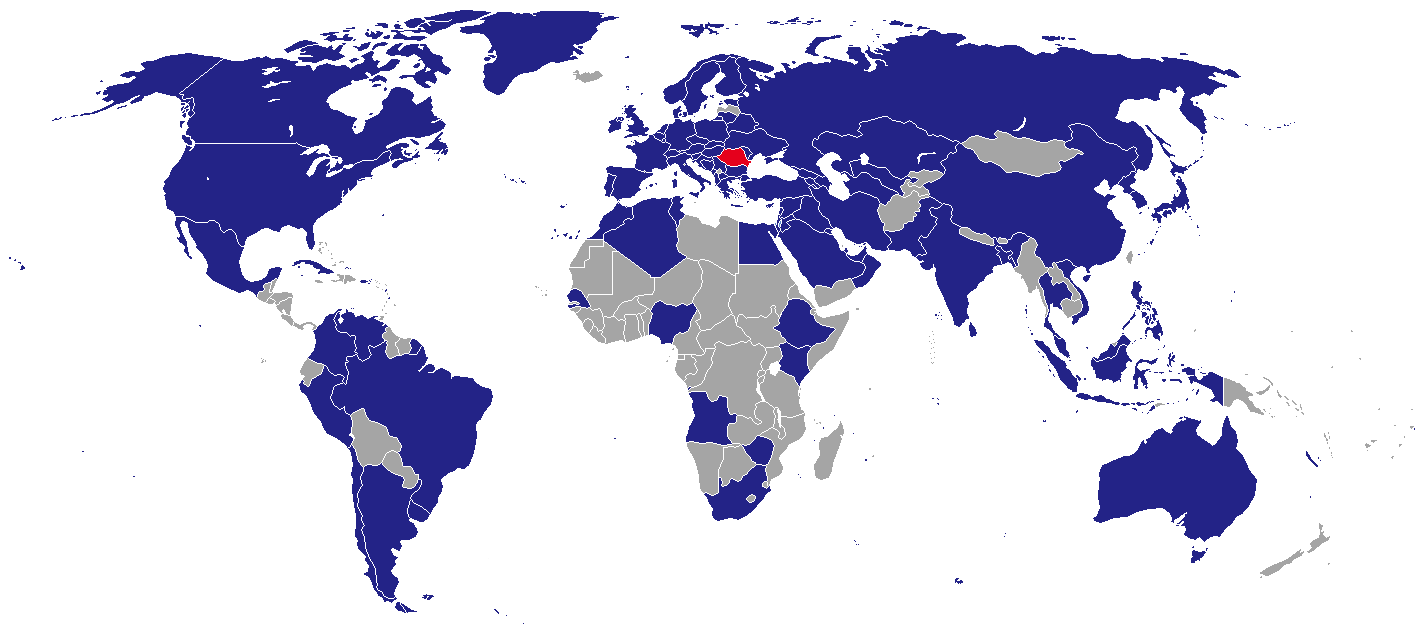
Diplomatic missions of Romania

When in a non-EU country where there is no Romanian embassy, Romanian citizens as EU citizens have the right to get consular protection from the embassy of any other EU country present in that country.

See also List of diplomatic missions of Romania.

== See also ==
- Visa requirements for European Union citizens
- Romanian passport
- Foreign relations of Romania
