= Romanian passport =

Passport of Romania issued to Romanian citizens

Romanian passport; Pașaport românesc
- Front cover of a Romanian passport

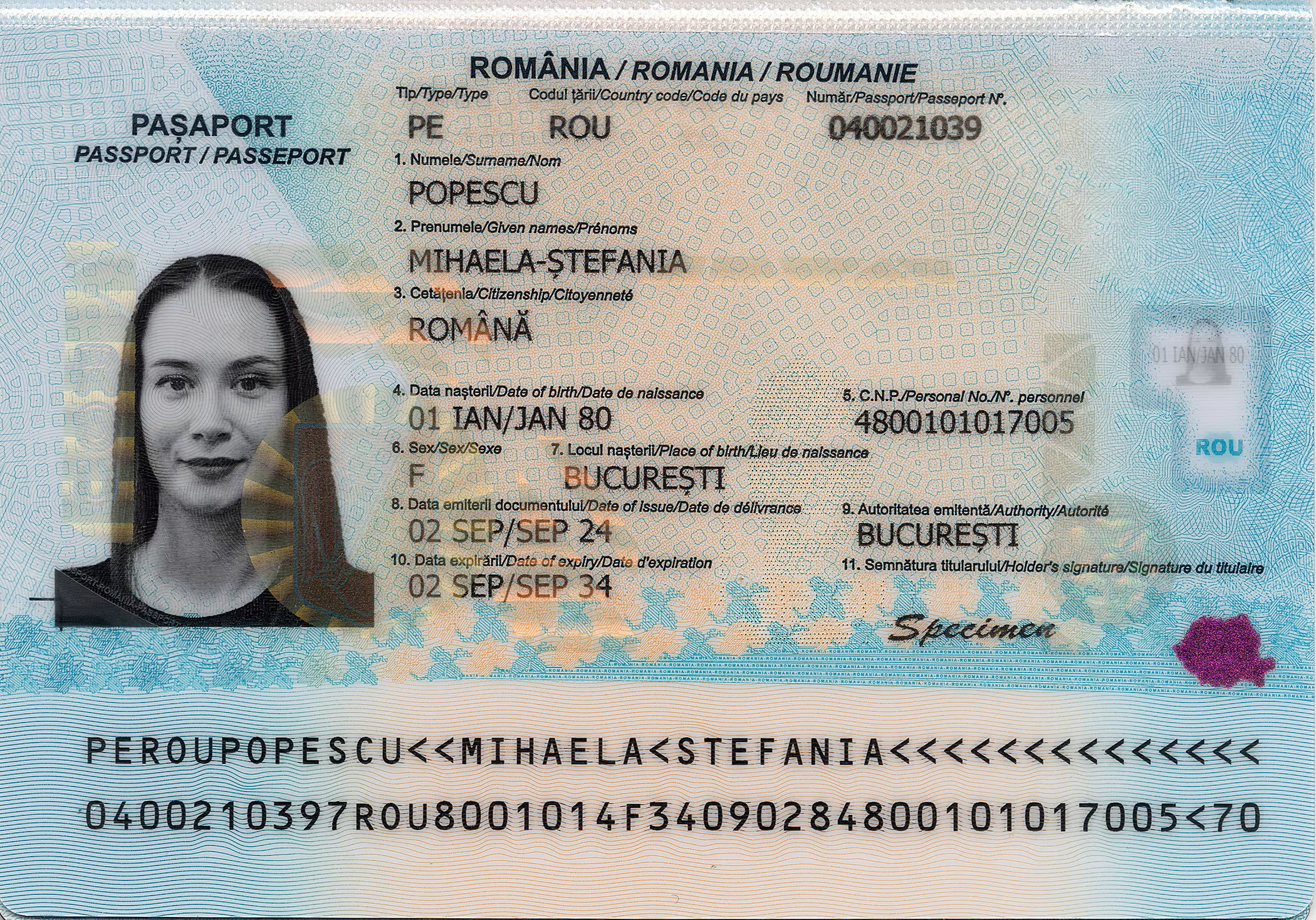
- The polycarbonate biodata page of a Romanian biometric passport
- Type: Passport
- Issued by: (Romania) Ministry of Internal Affairs
- First issued: 1830 (first version); 1912 (booklet); 1994 (machine-readable passport); 31 December 2008 (first biometric passport); 4 September 2024 (current version)
- Purpose: Identification
- Valid in: Worldwide
- Eligibility: Romanian citizenship
- Expiration: 3 years (age under 12 years); 5 years (age 12-17); 10 years (age 18 and over); 1 year (temporary passport)
- Cost: RON 265
- Website: pasapoarte.mai.gov.ro

A Romanian passport (Romanian: pașaport românesc) is the passport issued to citizens of Romania. Besides enabling the bearer to travel internationally and serving as indication of Romanian citizenship, the passport facilitates the process of securing assistance from Romanian consular officials abroad or other European Union member states in case a Romanian consular is absent, if needed.

As of 2024 Henley Passport Index, Romanian citizens can visit 177 countries without a visa or with a visa granted on arrival. Romanian citizens can live and work in any country within the EU as a result of the right of free movement and residence granted in Article 21 of the EU Treaty.

Every Romanian citizen is also a citizen of the European Union. The passport, along with the national identity card allows for free rights of movement and residence in any of the states of the European Union, European Economic Area and Switzerland. If a 3rd country doesn't host a Romanian Embassy, the bearer can request help from any other member state's embassy for consular protection. According to the Romanian law, March 19th is the Romanian Passport Day.

== History ==
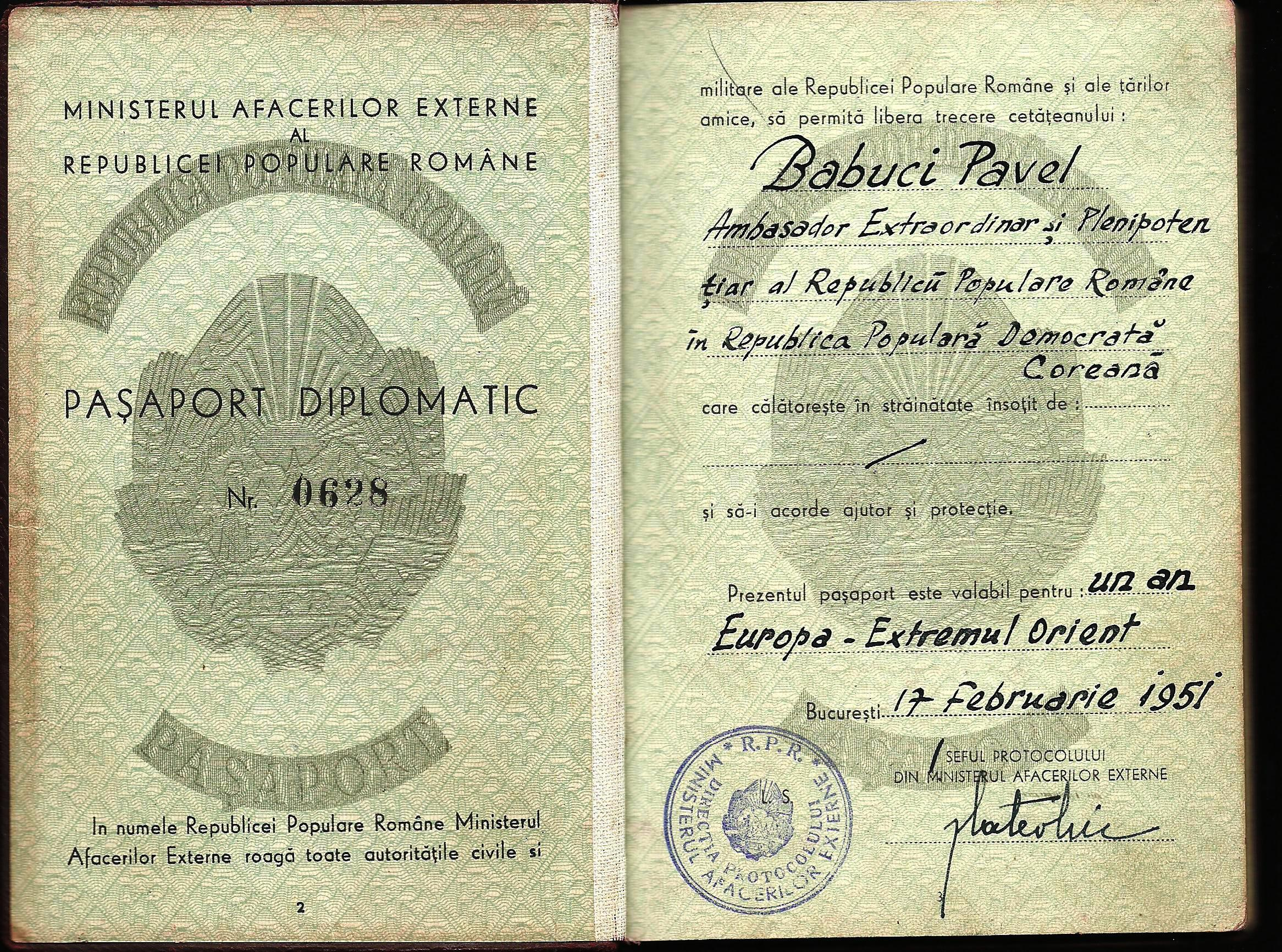
1951 Cold-War Romanian passport used by the Ambassador stationed in North Korea

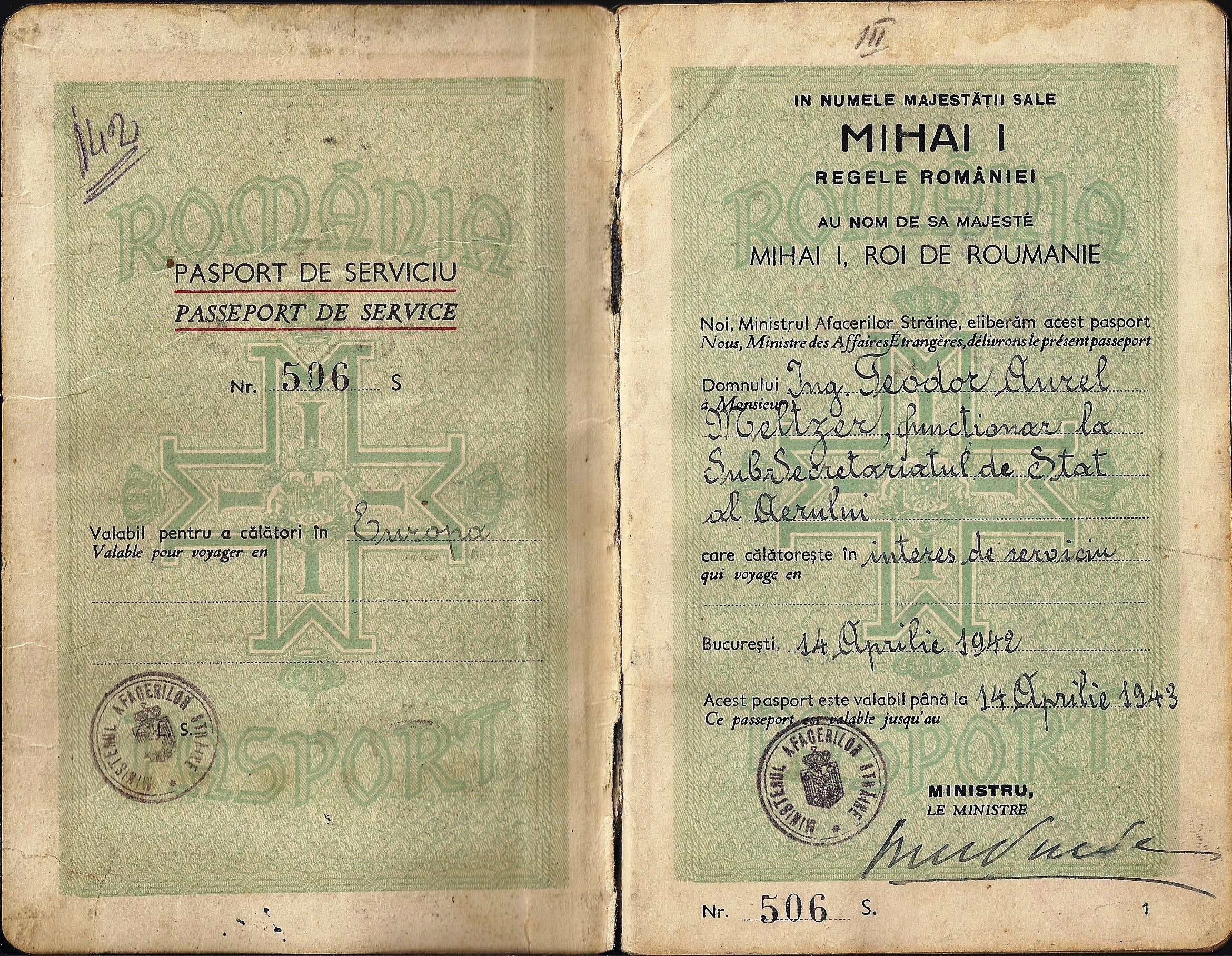
1942 Romanian Service passport issued to an official in the Ministry of Air being sent to Germany.

The term for passport – name still in use today, which describe the general document travel under which Romanian travellers can travel beyond the borders of the Danube and the Habsburg Empire – first appears regulated in the Organic Regulations, which came into force in 1830 in Moldavia and 1831 in Wallachia. According to historical data, travellers were required to show a passport at the border of Wallachia both the consulate, and ravaged by road. Foreigners arrived in the country had to have a visa Romanian consulate, which was present at Agie, where passports are then released which could move anywhere in the country.

A historic milestone in the evolution of Romanian passport was the promulgation, on 19 March 1912 by King Carol I, the first modern laws related to passports. Thus, the "Law on paspoartelor" Romanian state introduced the first general principles regarding passports and border crossing mandatory for authorities and citizens. The law was structured XI articles, passport thus becoming national legal instruments needed to be used when Romanians travelling abroad.

Issued by the Ministry of Interior and county prefects, "paspoartele" were issued in the name of King and had small portable card format "size 9 cm (4 in) 13 cm (5 in), is composed of 20 pages numbered." Each page had framed, a fund composed of national reasons, in light lilac colour, making apparent to stand above the coat of arms and having the word "Romania", and below the word "Pasport".

Evolution of the passports continued in the period before and during the Second World War, when new types of ordinary passports, service and diplomatic were introduced, some distinguished by a special technique of fastening (sticking, Stitching) tabs of covers, which create a fan effect.

=== Romanian People's Republic ===
Political and social changes occurring with the proclamation on 30 December 1947 of the Romanian People's Republic led authorities at the time to introduce into circulation passports with a new name of the state and a new heraldic.

=== Modern period ===
After the Romanian Revolution of 1989 and the collapse of the communist bloc Romanian authorities opened the country's borders, which led to an exodus of Romanian citizens wishing to travel abroad.

It was necessary that the organs with attributions issuing passports to circulate the Romanian travel documents to be aligned with international standards to be similar to those issued by other states. Thus, in accordance with Government Decision no. 757 of 30 December 1993, starting June 1994, was introduced into circulation a new model of Romanian passport simple first Romanian travel document issued in accordance with international standards.

On 21 January 2002, the Romanian government introduced a new type of passport in a decision taken due to exacerbation of migration and the need to ensure greater security of documents, as in use European and international level at the time.

Like most countries in Southeast Europe, Romania has committed itself in the process of accession to the EU, assuming certain responsibilities to comply, just as member countries, rules and requirements designed to compete in a safe lifestyle, this signifying and harmonisation of legislation and issuing travel documents to comply with international and European. The adoption on 20 July 2005, Law no. 248 on the free movement of Romanian citizens abroad held in conditions that Romanian citizens could exercise their right of free movement abroad and the limits of this right.

In 2019 a new design was introduced for the passport. The new design has the country's 3D amended coat of arms which now contains a crown at the top of the eagle. On page 16, the passport holder must complete the particular details of a relative or friend who can be contacted in case of accident: full name, address and telephone.

On September 4, 2024, a new, fourth generation design was introduced into circulation. These documents are produced by the National Company "Imprimeria Națională" S.A. in collaboration with specialists from the General Directorate of Passports within the Ministry of Internal Affairs. This design has changes its chromaticity and combines shades of bluish-green with bright orange tints in the background design. In addition to the elements inspired by traditional Romanian motifs, the graphic theme of the passport integrates by embossing on the last outer cover Peony, the national flower of Romania.

== Types ==
The types of passports are:

- Diplomatic
- Business
- Simple (biometric): valid for 10 years for applicants aged 18 or over, 5 years for applicants between 12 and 18 years of age, and 3 years for applicants under the age of 12;
- Simple (temporary): valid for 12 months, issued as an emergency travel document.

Romania has begun issuing its biometric passport on 31 December 2008.

== Application ==
The Ministry of Internal Affairs, through the Community Public Service of Issuance and Registration of Simple Passports (Romanian: Serviciul Public Comunitar pentru Eliberarea şi Evidenţa Paşapoartelor Simple), is responsible for the issuance and renewal of Romanian passports.

== Description ==
Regular Romanian EU passports are burgundy red in colour, with the Romania Coat of Arms emblazoned in the centre of the front cover. The words "European Union", "Romania", and "passport" are inscribed above and below the coat of arms (in Romanian). The information page identifying the bearer and the issuing authority is on the first page, not numbered (the Romanian passport contains 32 pages, information written on the 32nd page of the passport). On the last page, the bearer fills in information regarding contact person (persons) in case of emergency. On the third cover (the inner back cover) there are instructions for the bearer how to use and how not to use the passport.

The Romanian identity card can now be used to travel within the European Union.

=== Identity Information Page ===
The Romanian Passport includes the following data:

- Photo of Passport Holder
- Type (PE) or (PP)
- Country Code (ROU)
- Passport No. (changes upon each renewal)
- Personal No. (CNP)
- Surname
- Given Names
- Citizenship (Unlike most passports, the Romanian passport lists citizenship instead of nationality.)
- Date of Birth
- Sex
- Place of Birth
- Date of Issue
- Date of Expiry
- Authority
- Holder's Signature, if applicable

The information page ends with the Machine Readable Zone. The data page/information page is printed in Romanian, English and French.

== Visa requirements ==
Visa requirements for Romanian citizens Romania Freedom of movement Visa free Visa issued upon arrival eVisa Visa available both on arrival or online Visa required prior to arrival

As of January 2025, Romanian citizens had visa-free or visa on arrival access to 178 countries and territories, making the Romanian Passport 12th in terms of travel freedom.

== Gallery of historic images ==
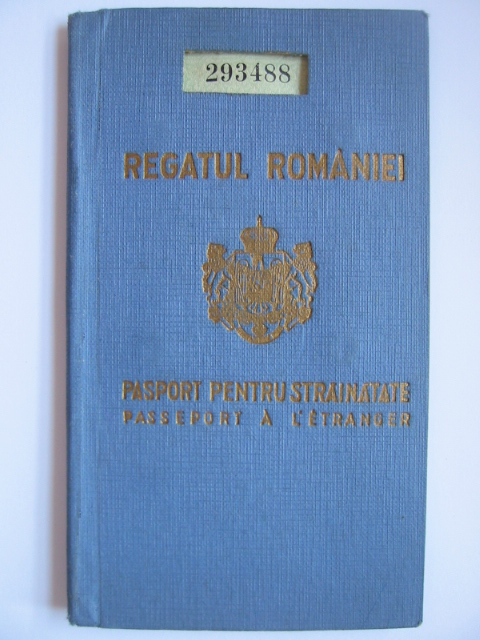
Kingdom of Romania
Romanian Passport (1932 - 1947)

Socialist Republic Romanian Passport (issued in August 1987)

Blue passport (1982) for Romanian citizens with residence abroad.

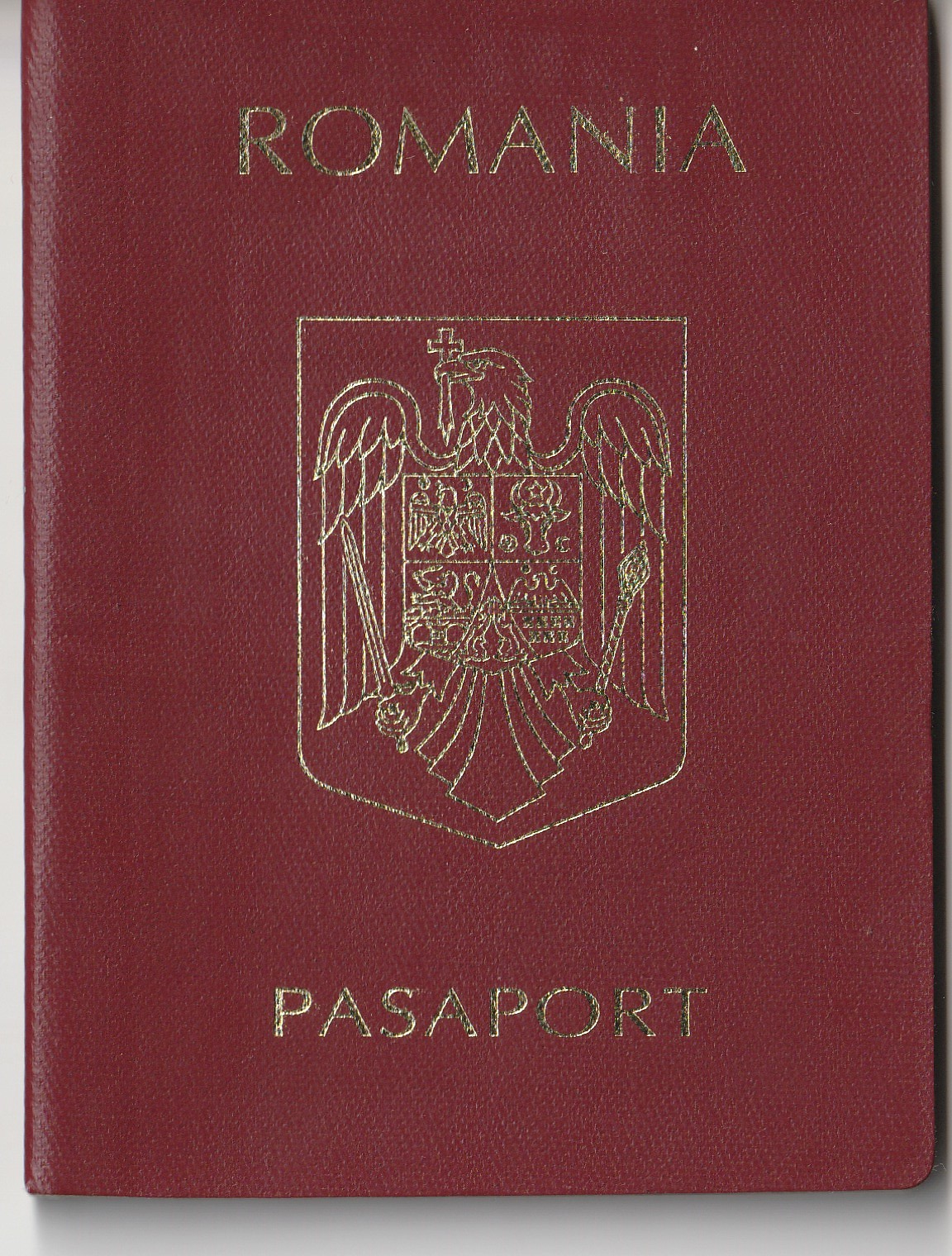
Romanian Passport issued in January 2000 (June 1994 - January 2002)

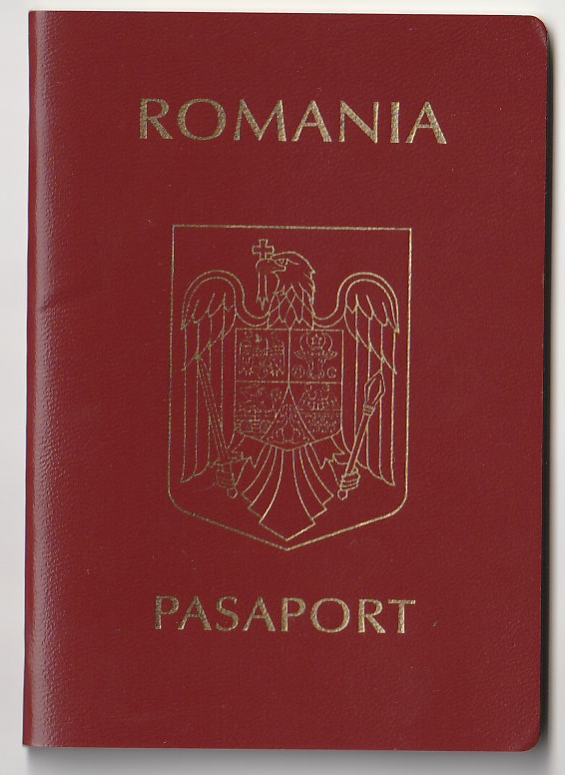
Romanian Passport issued in June 2007 (January 2002 - December 2008)

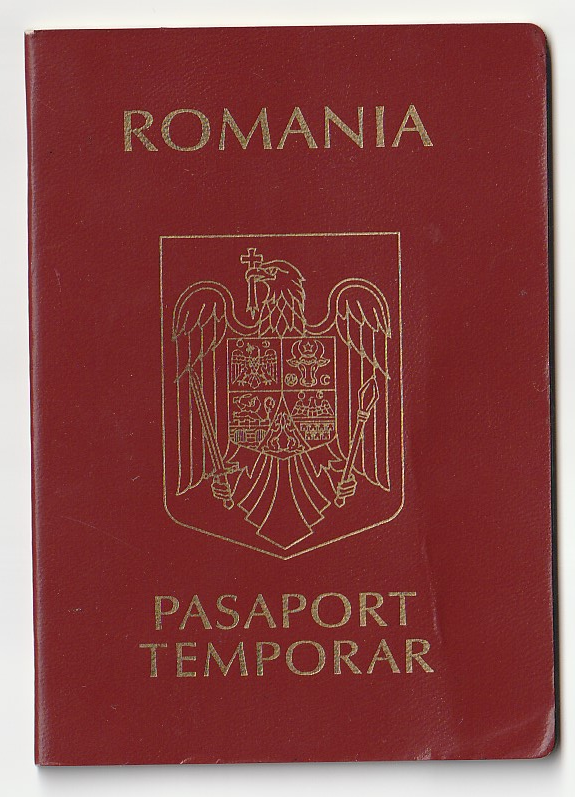
Romanian Temporary Passport issued in November 2011

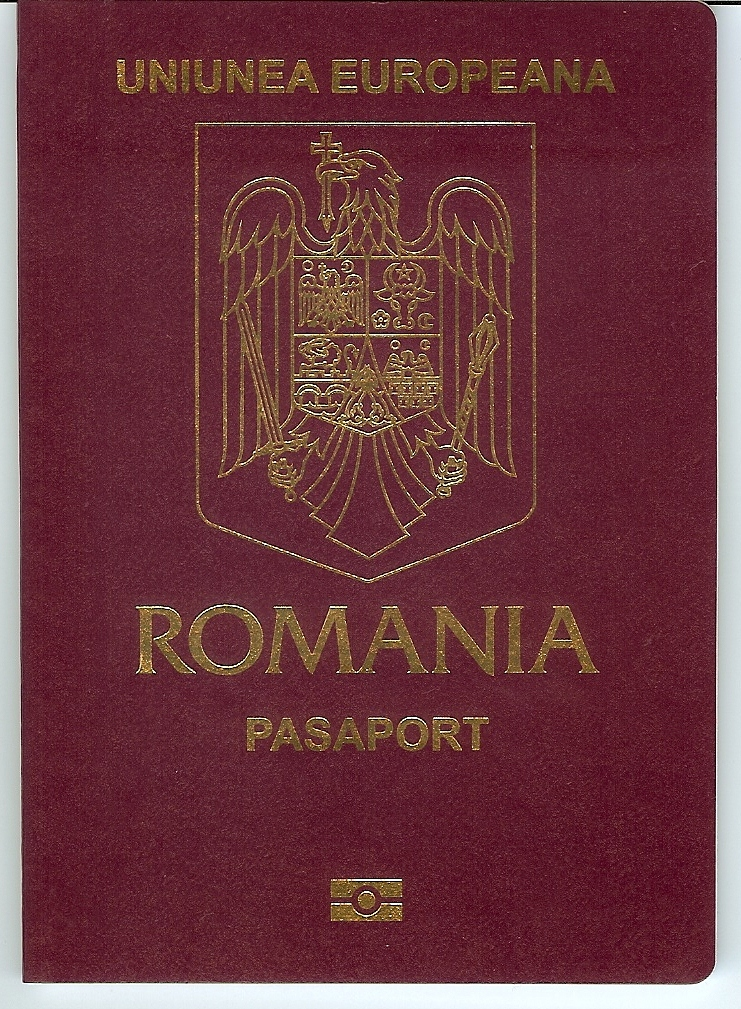
EU Romanian Biometric Passport (2008 - 2011)

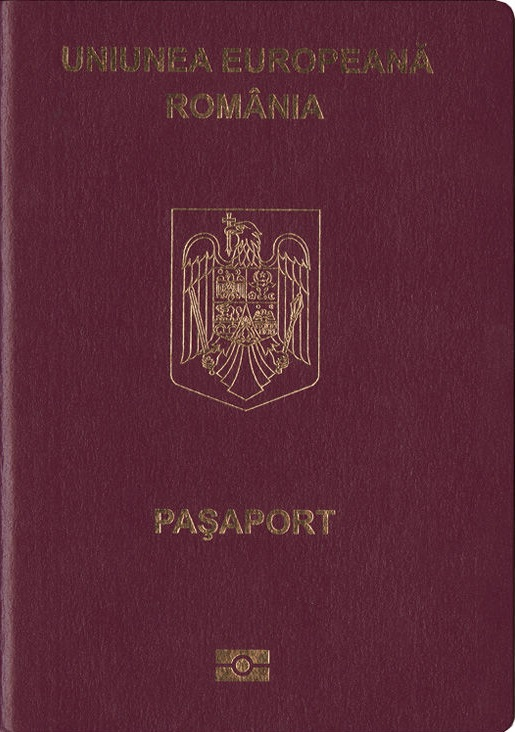
EU Romanian Biometric Passport (2011 - 2019)

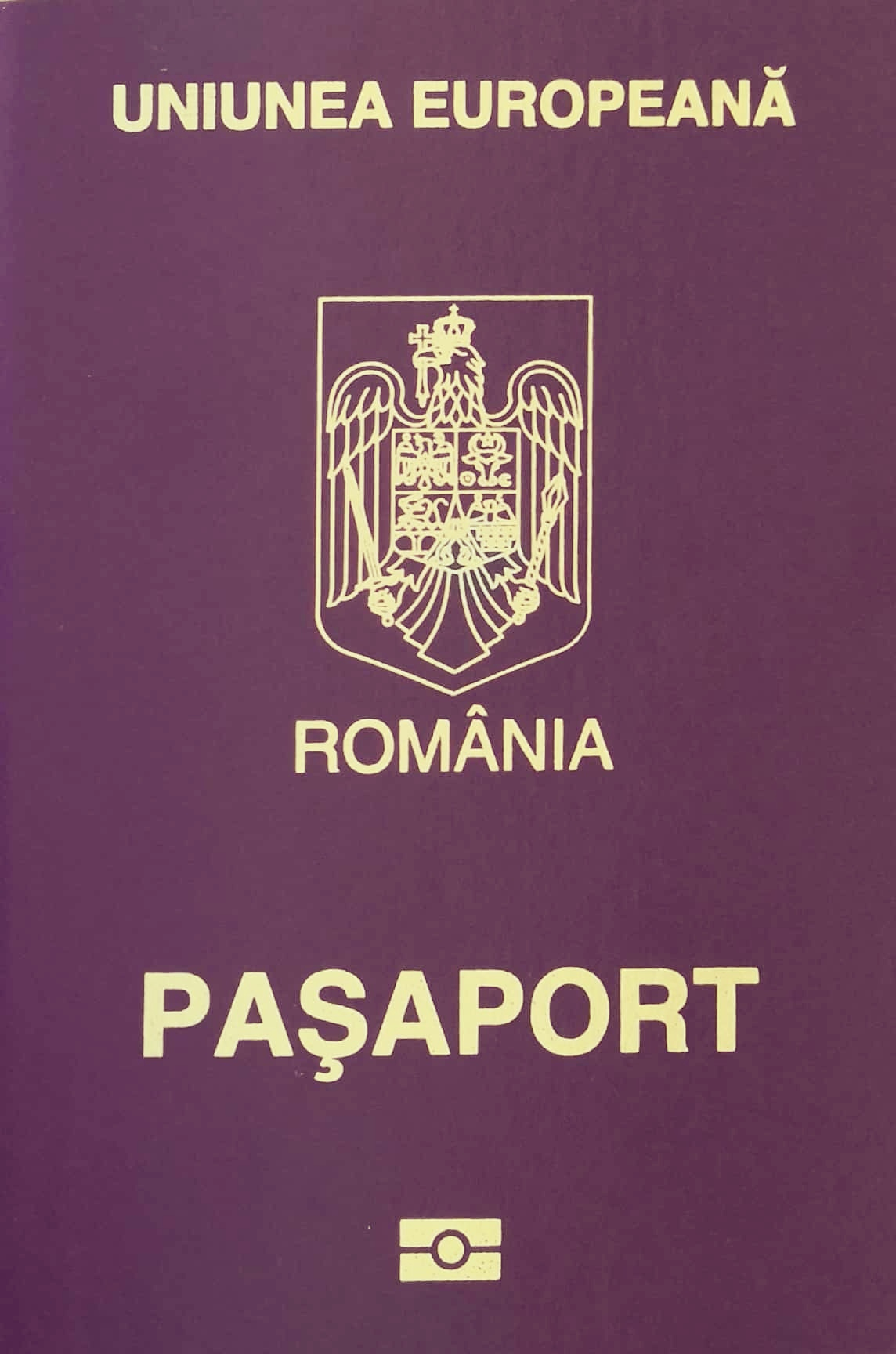
EU Romanian Biometric Passport (2019 - 2024)

== See also ==
- Visa requirements for Romanian citizens
- Visa policy of the Schengen Area
- Passports of the European Union
- Romanian identity card
- Romanian nationality law
- Moldovan passport (Transnistrian)
