= Visa requirements for Libyan citizens =

Administrative entry restrictions

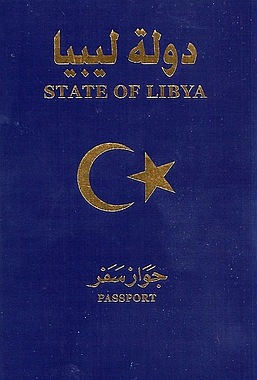
A Libyan passport

Visa requirements for Libyan citizens are administrative entry restrictions by the authorities of other states placed on citizens of Libya.

As of 2026, Libyan citizens had visa-free or visa on arrival access to 39 countries and territories, ranking the Libyan passport 93rd in the world in terms of travel freedom according to the Henley Passport Index.

== Visa requirements map ==
Visa requirements for Libyan citizens holding ordinary passports Libya Visa not required/eTA Visa on arrival eVisa Visa available both on arrival or online Visa required

== Visa requirements ==
Country	Visa requirement	Allowed stay	Notes (excluding departure fees)
Afghanistan	eVisa		Visa is not required in case born in Afghanistan or can proof that one of their parents is a national of Afghanistan or born in Afghanistan.; e-Visa : Visitors must arrive at Kabul International (KBL).
Albania	eVisa		Visa is not required for Holders of a valid multiple-entry Schengen, UK or US visa has been previously used once or residence permit of Ireland, Schengen, UK, US or UAE 10 years.
Algeria	Visa not required	90 days	
Andorra	Visa required		Although no visa requirements exist, apply the relevant regulations of France or Spain, whichever must be transited to reach Andorra.
Angola	eVisa		
Antigua and Barbuda	eVisa		Libyans with a visa or residency issued by Canada, USA, United Kingdom or a Schengen Member State can obtain a visa upon arrival that costs USD100 for a maximum of 30 days.
Argentina	Visa required		
Armenia	Visa required		
Australia and territories	Online Visa Required		May apply online (Online Visitor e600 visa).
Austria	Visa required		
Azerbaijan	Visa required		
Bahamas	eVisa		
Bahrain	eVisa / Visa on arrival		
Bangladesh	Visa required		
Barbados	Visa required		
Belarus	Visa not required		
Belgium	Visa required		
Belize	Visa required		Visa is not required for holders of a valid multiple-entry visa or permanent residence of Canada, Schengen or US.
Benin	Visa not required	90 days	
Bhutan	eVisa		
Bolivia	Online Visa	30 days	
Bosnia and Herzegovina	Visa required		
Botswana	eVisa	3 months	
Brazil	Visa required		
Brunei	Visa required		
Bulgaria	Visa required		
Burkina Faso	eVisa	1 month	
Burundi	eVisa / Visa on arrival	30 days	
Cambodia	eVisa / Visa on arrival	30 days	
Cameroon	eVisa		
Canada	Visa required		US permanent resident card (Green card) holders can enter visa free
Cape Verde	Visa on arrival		Visa on arrival at Sal, Boa Vista, São Vicente or Santiago international airports.; Requirement to register online 5 days before arrival; Also pay the airport security fee of CVE 3400 either online or on arrival.
Central African Republic	Visa required		
Chad	eVisa		
Chile	Visa required		
China	Visa required		
Colombia	eVisa		
Comoros	Visa on arrival	45 days	
Republic of the Congo	Visa required		
Democratic Republic of the Congo	eVisa	7 days	
Costa Rica	Visa required		
Côte d'Ivoire	eVisa	3 months	
Croatia	Visa required		
Cuba	eVisa	90 days	Can be extended up to 90 days with a fee.
Cyprus	Visa required		
Czech Republic	Visa required		
Denmark	Visa required		
Djibouti	eVisa	31 days	
Dominica	Visa not required	21 days	
Dominican Republic	Visa required		
Ecuador	Visa required		
Egypt	Visa required		Entry visa costs 25 Dollar per person when entering from the Emsaid Salloum border crossing.; In addition to paying 875 Egyptian pounds for each Libyan citizen upon entering and exiting the border crossing between Libya and Egypt, Emsaid Salloum; Security approval is only required for males over 18 and under 45 years of age.
El Salvador	Visa required		
Equatorial Guinea	eVisa		
Eritrea	Visa required		
Estonia	Visa required		
Eswatini	Visa required		
Ethiopia	eVisa / Visa on arrival	up to 90 days	Visa on arrival is obtainable only at Addis Ababa Bole International Airport.; e-Visa holders must arrive via Addis Ababa Bole International Airport.; e-Visa is available for 30 or 90 days.
Fiji	eVisa		
Finland	Visa required		
France	Visa required		
Gabon	eVisa		Electronic visa holders must arrive via Libreville International Airport.
Gambia	Visa required		In addition to a visa, an entry clearance must be obtained from the Gambian Immigration prior to travel.
Georgia	Visa required		
Germany	Visa required		
Ghana	Free Electronic Travel Authorisation	90 days	
Greece	Visa required		
Grenada	Visa required		
Guatemala	Visa required		
Guinea	eVisa	90 days	
Guinea-Bissau	eVisa / Visa on arrival	90 days	
Guyana	eVisa		
Haiti	Visa required		
Honduras	Visa required		
Hungary	Visa required		
Iceland	Visa required		
India	Visa required		
Indonesia	eVisa		
Iran	eVisa	30 days	
Iraq	eVisa		
Ireland	Visa required		
Israel	Visa required		Confirmation from Israeli Foreign Ministry is required before a visa is issued.
Italy	Visa required		
Jamaica	Visa required		
Japan	Visa required		
Jordan	eVisa / Visa on arrival	90 days	
Kazakhstan	Visa required		
Kenya	Electronic Travel Authorisation	90 days	Applications can be submitted up to 90 days prior to travel and must be submitted at least 3 days in advance.; eTA fee is 32.50 USD.; Proof of reservation at the hotel where visitors plan to stay is required (if staying with friends, an invitation letter is also acceptable).; Yellow fever vaccination certificate is required if coming from endemic countries.
Kiribati	Visa required		
North Korea	Visa required		
South Korea	Visa required		
Kuwait	Visa required		
Kyrgyzstan	eVisa		
Laos	Visa required		
Latvia	Visa required		
Lebanon	Visa on arrival (Conditional)		Visa on arrival at Beirut International Airport or any other port of entry only if they are holding a copy of a reservation in a 3- to 5-star hotel or private residential address with telephone number in the Republic of Lebanon, at least US$2,000 in cash, a non-refundable return or circle trip ticket, and there are no Israeli stamps, visas, or seals on their passport.
Lesotho	eVisa		
Liberia	eVOA		
Liechtenstein	Visa required		
Lithuania	Visa required		
Luxembourg	Visa required		
Madagascar	eVisa / Visa on arrival	90 days	
Malawi	eVisa	90 days	
Malaysia	Visa not required	30 days	
Maldives	Free Visa on arrival	30 days	
Mali	Visa required		
Malta	Visa required		
Marshall Islands	Visa required		
Mauritania	Visa not required		
Mauritius	Visa required		
Mexico	Visa required		Visa is not required for Holders of a valid visa of Canada, US, UK or a Schengen State and Permanent residence of Canada, Chile, Colombia, Schengen State, Japan, UK, US; Entry may be refused by immigration officials for individuals who were previously denied a US visa, even if holding a valid Mexican visa.
Micronesia	Visa not required	30 days	
Moldova	Visa required		
Monaco	Visa required		
Mongolia	Visa required		
Montenegro	Visa required		
Morocco	Visa required		
Mozambique	eVisa/Visa on arrival	30 days	
Myanmar	Visa required		
Namibia	eVisa / Visa on arrival	90 days / 3 months	
Nauru	Visa required		
Nepal	eVisa / Visa on arrival	90 days	
Netherlands	Visa required		
New Zealand	Visa required		Holders of an Australian Permanent Resident Visa or Resident Return Visa may be granted a New Zealand Resident Visa on arrival permitting indefinite stay (pursuant to the Trans-Tasman Travel Arrangement), subject to meeting character requirements and obtaining an Electronic Travel Authority prior to departure.
Nicaragua	eVisa	30 days	VoA with valid visas of US, Canada, and Schengen.; maximum allowed stay with extensions for eVisa is 120 days
Niger	Visa required		
Nigeria	eVisa	90 days	
North Macedonia	Visa required		
Norway	Visa required		
Oman	Visa required		
Pakistan	eVisa	3 months	
Palau	Free Visa on arrival	30 days	
Panama	Visa required		
Papua New Guinea	eVisa	60 days	
Paraguay	Visa required		
Peru	Visa required		
Philippines	eVisa	59 days	Available in single entry (valid for 3 months) or multiple entry (valid for 6 months or 1 year).
Poland	Visa required		
Portugal	Visa required		
Qatar	eVisa		
Romania	Visa required		
Russia	Visa required		
Rwanda	Visa not required	30 days	
Saint Kitts and Nevis	eVisa		
Saint Lucia	Visa required		
Saint Vincent and the Grenadines	Visa not required	1 month	
Samoa	Visa not required	60 days	
San Marino	Visa required		
São Tomé and Príncipe	eVisa		
Saudi Arabia	Visa required		
Senegal	Visa on arrival	90 days	
Serbia	eVisa	90 days	90 days within any 180-day period. Transfers allowed.; Visa-free for a maximum stay of 90 days for valid visa holders or residents of the European Union member states and the United States.
Seychelles	Free Visitor's Permit on arrival	3 months	
Sierra Leone	eVisa	3 months	
Singapore	eVisa		May obtain the online e-Service through eligible through authorized travel agencies or through local sponsors (Singapore citizen or permanent residents).; Visa-free transit for 96 hours.
Slovakia	Visa required		
Slovenia	Visa required		
Solomon Islands	Visa required		
Somalia	eVisa	30 days	
South Africa	Visa required		
South Sudan	eVisa		Obtainable online; Printed visa authorization must be presented at the time of travel
Spain	Visa required		
Sri Lanka	Electronic Travel Authorization	30 days	
Sudan	Visa required		
Suriname	Visa not required	90 days	
Sweden	Visa required		
Switzerland	Visa required		
Syria	eVisa		
Tajikistan	eVisa		
Tanzania	eVisa / Visa on arrival	3 months	
Thailand	eVisa	60 days	
Timor-Leste	Visa on arrival	30 days	
Togo	eVisa	15 days	
Tonga	Visa required		
Trinidad and Tobago	eVisa		
Tunisia	Visa not required	3 months	
Turkey	Visa not required (Conditional)	90 days	90 days within any 180 day period, provided being under the age of 16 or above the age of 45.
Turkmenistan	Visa required		
Tuvalu	Visa on arrival	1 month	
Uganda	eVisa / Visa on arrival		Visa fee is 50 USD.; Can also be entered on an East Africa Tourist Visa issued by Kenya or Rwanda.
Ukraine	Visa required		
United Arab Emirates	eVisa		May apply online.; May apply also using 'Smart service'.
United Kingdom and Crown dependencies	Visa required		
United States	Visa restricted		Effective June 9, 2025, U.S. visas will no longer be issued to citizens of 12 countries, with certain exemptions.
Uruguay	Visa required		
Uzbekistan	Visa required		
Vanuatu	eVisa		Open borders but de facto follows Italian visa policy.
Vatican City	Visa required		
Venezuela	eVisa		Introduction of Electronic Visa System for Tourist and Business Travelers.
Vietnam	eVisa		e-Visa is valid for 90 days and multiple entry.; Phú Quốc visa exemption for up to 30 days. Passengers who arrive at Hanoi (HAN) or Ho Chi Minh City (SGN) do not need a visa for a maximum of 30 days if they have a ticket on the same calendar day to Phu Quoc (PQC). They must be escorted by the arriving carrier to the domestic terminal
Yemen	Visa required		
Zambia	eVisa		
Zimbabwe	eVisa		

== Dependent, Disputed, or Restricted territories ==
Unrecognized or partially recognized countries

Territory	Conditions of access	Notes
Abkhazia	Visa required	
Kosovo	Visa required	Do not need a visa a holder of a valid biometric residence permit issued by one of the Schengen member states or a valid multi-entry Schengen Visa, a holder of a valid Laissez-Passer issued by United Nations Organizations, NATO, OSCE, Council of Europe or European Union a holder of a valid travel documents issued by EU Member and Schengen States, United States of America, Canada, Australia and Japan based on the 1951 Convention on Refugee Status or the 1954 Convention on the Status of Stateless Persons, as well as holders of valid travel documents for foreigners (max. 15 days stay)
Northern Cyprus	Visa not required	
Palestine	Visa not required	Arrival by sea to Gaza Strip not allowed.
Sahrawi Arab Democratic Republic		Undefined visa regime in the Western Sahara controlled territory.
Somaliland	Visa on arrival	30 days for 30 US dollars, payable on arrival.
South Ossetia	Visa not required	Multiple entry visa to Russia and three day prior notification are required to enter South Ossetia.
Taiwan	Visa required	
Transnistria	Visa not required	Registration required after 24h.

Dependent and autonomous territories

Territory	Conditions of access	Notes
China
Hong Kong	eVisa	
Macau	Visa on arrival	
Denmark
Faroe Islands	Visa required	
Greenland	Visa required	
France
French Guiana	Visa required	
French Polynesia	Visa required	
(France) French West Indies	Visa required	Includes overseas departments of Guadeloupe and Martinique and overseas collectivities of Saint Barthélemy and Saint Martin.
Mayotte	Visa required	
New Caledonia	Visa required	
Réunion	Visa required	
Saint Pierre and Miquelon	Visa required	
Wallis and Futuna	Visa required	
Netherlands
Aruba	Visa required	
Caribbean Netherlands	Visa required	Includes Bonaire, Sint Eustatius and Saba.
Curaçao	Visa required	
Sint Maarten	Visa required	
New Zealand
Cook Islands	Visa not required	31 days
Niue	Visa not required	30 days
Tokelau	Visa required	
United Kingdom
Akrotiri and Dhekelia	Visa required	
Anguilla	Visa required	Holders of a valid visa issued by the United Kingdom do not require a visa.
Bermuda	Visa required	
British Indian Ocean Territory	Special permit required	Special permit required.
British Virgin Islands	Visa required	
Cayman Islands	Visa required	
Falkland Islands	Visa required	
Gibraltar	Visa required	
Montserrat	eVisa	
Pitcairn Islands	Visa not required	14 days visa free and landing fee 35 USD or tax of 5 USD if not going ashore.
Ascension Island	Admission refused	From May 2015, the Ascension Island Government does not issue entry visas including eVisas to nationals of Libya.
Saint Helena	eVisa	
Tristan da Cunha	Permission required	Permission to land required for 15/30 pounds sterling (yacht/ship passenger) for Tristan da Cunha Island or 20 pounds sterling for Gough Island, Inaccessible Island or Nightingale Islands.
South Georgia and the South Sandwich Islands	Permit required	Pre-arrival permit from the Commissioner required (72 hours/1 month for 110/160 pounds sterling).
Turks and Caicos Islands	Visa required	Holders of a valid visa issued by Canada, United Kingdom or the USA do not required a visa for a maximum stay of 90 days.
United States
American Samoa	Visa required	
Guam	Visa required	
Northern Mariana Islands	Visa required	
Puerto Rico	Visa required	
U.S. Virgin Islands	Visa required	
Antarctica and adjacent islands
Special permits required for Bouvet Island, British Antarctic Territory, French Southern and Antarctic Lands, Argentine Antarctica, (Australia) Australian Antarctic Territory, (Antártica Chilena Province) Chilean Antarctic Territory, (Australia) Heard Island and McDonald Islands, (Norway) Peter I Island, (Norway) Queen Maud Land, (New Zealand) Ross Dependency.

== See also ==
- Visa policy of Libya
- Libyan passport
- List of nationalities forbidden at border
