= Visa requirements for Abkhazian citizens =

Administrative entry restrictions

Since Abkhazia is only recognised as a sovereign state by a handful of nations, most countries do not accept Abkhaz passports and impose administrative entry restrictions on citizens of Abkhazia.

== Passport Validity ==
Nicaragua
Russia
South Ossetia
Syria
Transnistria
Tuvalu
Venezuela

== Visa waiver agreements ==
Abkhazia has mutual visa-free agreements with Nicaragua, Russia, South Ossetia and Tuvalu. Abkhazians can travel to Russia using internal (domestic) and foreign passports.

== See also ==
- Abkhazian passport
- List of citizenships refused entry to foreign states
- Visa policy of Abkhazia
