= South Ossetian passport =

Passports issued to South Ossetia nationals

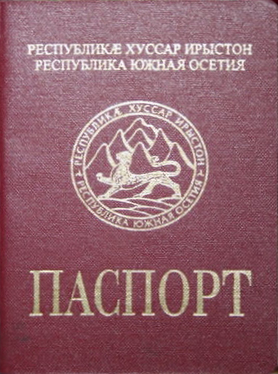
- Type: Passport
- Issued by: South Ossetia
- Purpose: Identification
- Eligibility: South Ossetian citizenship

South Ossetian passports are issued to inhabitants of South Ossetia (a disputed territory in the South Caucasus) for the purpose of international travel and for the purpose of legal identification within South Ossetia. They were first issued on August 15, 2006. Since South Ossetia is only recognised by Russia, Venezuela, Nicaragua, and Syria, many South Ossetians also have Russian passports, which are more practical for international travel.

== History ==
The first proposals to introduce a national passport were voiced back in the 1990s, but at that time the country's leadership did not attach much importance to this, so the passport was introduced only on August 16, 2006. The first person to receive a passport as a citizen of South Ossetia was its president, Eduard Kokoity. Before this and currently, residents of South Ossetia used Russian and Soviet passports. Some South Ossetian citizens of Georgian nationality also preferred to receive South Ossetian passports. Among other famous people, the passport was received by the chief state sanitary doctor of Russia Gennady Onishchenko, as well as a number of famous Russian politicians, journalists and cultural and artistic figures.

On February 1, 2010, an agreement on a visa-free regime was signed between Russia and South Ossetia, which officially regulates the validity of South Ossetian passports on the territory of the Russian Federation. The visa-free regime came into force on March 4, 2010.

On August 1, 2014, applications began to be accepted for a passport of a citizen of the Republic of South Ossetia, identifying the identity of a citizen of the Republic of South Ossetia outside the Republic (foreign passport).

== Dual citizenship ==
In South Ossetia, multiple citizenship is selectively allowed – in particular, by 2019, 95% of the population of South Ossetia had dual citizenship (Russian and South Ossetian). At the same time, it was reported that Georgian citizenship was illegal as a second one.

At the same time, the EU will not recognize Russian passports issued in South Ossetia since 2022. According to a report by the international non-governmental organization "Crisis Group", as of 2010, South Ossetians who have a Russian internal passport with registration can receive free medical care in Russia.

== See also ==
- Visa requirements for South Ossetian citizens
- International recognition of Abkhazia and South Ossetia
- Foreign relations of South Ossetia
- List of citizenships refused entry to foreign states
