= Visa requirements for South Ossetian citizens =

Administrative entry restrictions

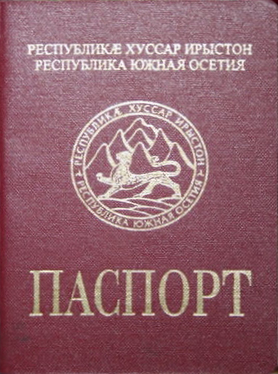
A South Ossetian passport

Visa requirements for South Ossetian citizens are administrative entry restrictions imposed on citizens of South Ossetia by the authorities of other states.

== Passport validity ==
Abkhazia
Nicaragua
Russia
Syria
Transnistria
Venezuela

== Visa requirements ==
South Ossetia has mutual visa-free agreements with Russia in 2010 and Abkhazia in 2015. South Ossetians can either use their domestic or international passport to enter Russia and Abkhazia. In 2016, news reports claimed that South Ossetia and Venezuela were preparing to sign a mutual visa-free agreement. It is unknown if an agreement was ever signed.

== See also ==
- Visa policy of South Ossetia
- South Ossetian passport
- List of citizenships refused entry to foreign states
- International recognition of Abkhazia and South Ossetia
- Foreign relations of South Ossetia
