= List of diplomatic missions of Libya =

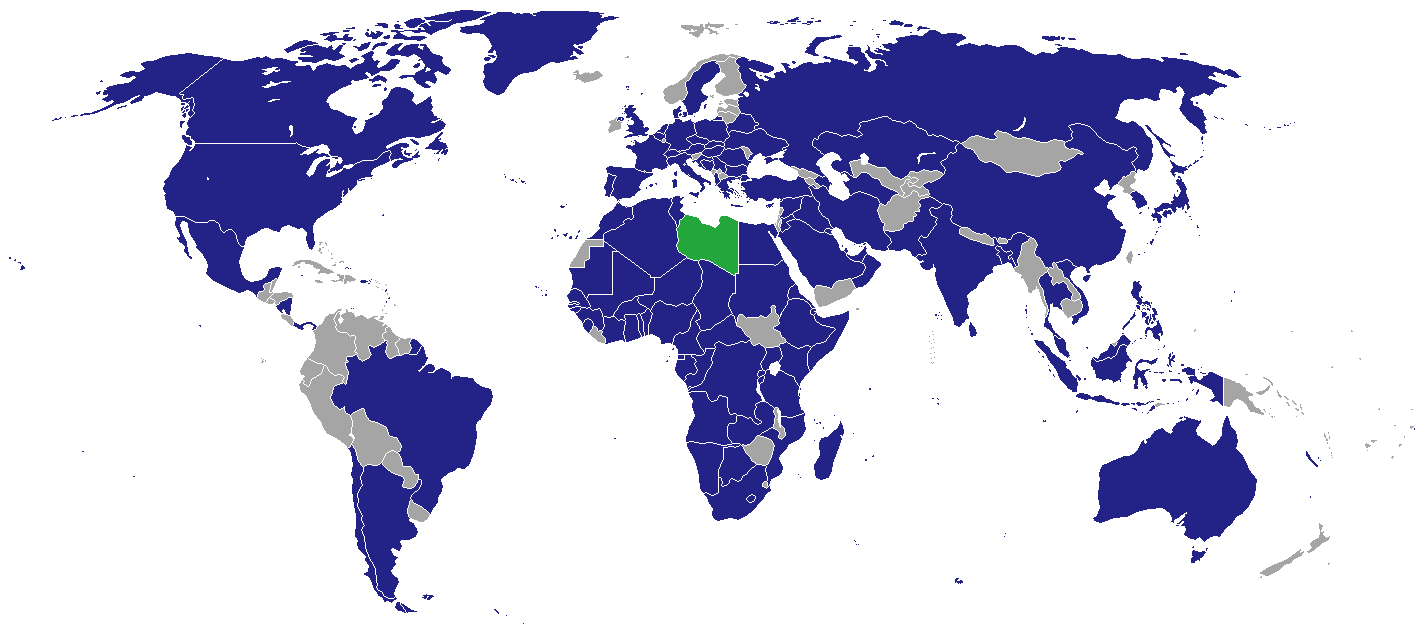
Map of diplomatic missions of Libya

This is a list of diplomatic missions of Libya.

Honorary consulates are omitted from this listing.

== History ==
Under the rule of Muammar Gaddafi, Libya broke practice with almost all other countries in 1979 by renaming their embassies "People's Bureaus", with the diplomatic staff known as a local "revolutionary committee".

During the 2011 Libyan civil war, there were two governments claiming to be the de jure government of Libya. One was led by Gaddafi and the other was the National Transitional Council. Some countries had recognised the NTC as the governing authority of Libya and Libyan ambassadors to those countries were nominated by the NTC.

The NTC was awarded Libya's seat at the United Nations in September 2011 following a vote by the General Assembly.

== Current missions ==
=== Africa ===
Host country	Host city	Mission	Concurrent accreditation	Ref.
Algeria	Algiers	Embassy	Countries: Sahrawi Republic	
Angola	Luanda	Embassy		
Benin	Cotonou	Embassy		
Burkina Faso	Ouagadougou	Embassy		
Burundi	Bujumbura	Embassy		
Botswana	Gaborone	Embassy		
Cameroon	Yaoundé	Embassy		
Cape Verde	Praia	Embassy		
Central African Republic	Bangui	Embassy		
Chad	N'djamena	Embassy		
Chad	Abeche	Consulate-General		
Comoros	Moroni	Embassy		
Congo-Brazzaville	Brazzaville	Embassy		
Congo-Kinshasa	Kinshasa	Embassy		
Djibouti	Djibouti City	Embassy		
Egypt	Cairo	Embassy	Countries: Palestine; International Organizations: Arab League	
Egypt	Alexandria	Consulate-General	Countries: Palestine; International Organizations: Arab League	
Equatorial Guinea	Malabo	Embassy		
Eritrea	Asmara	Embassy		
Ethiopia	Addis Ababa	Embassy	International Organizations: African Union	
Gabon	Libreville	Embassy		
Gambia	Banjul	Embassy		
Ghana	Accra	Embassy		
Guinea	Conakry	Embassy		
Guinea-Bissau	Bissau	Embassy		
Ivory Coast	Abidjan	Embassy		
Kenya	Nairobi	Embassy	International Organizations: United Nations; United Nations Environment Programme; United Nations Human Settlements Programme	
Lesotho	Maseru	Embassy		
Liberia	Monrovia	Embassy		
Madagascar	Antananarivo	Embassy		
Mali	Bamako	Embassy		
Mauritania	Nouakchott	Embassy		
Mauritius	Port Louis	Embassy		
Morocco	Rabat	Embassy		
Morocco	Casablanca	Consulate-General		
Mozambique	Maputo	Embassy	Countries: Malawi	
Namibia	Windhoek	Embassy		
Niger	Niamey	Embassy		
Niger	Agadez	Consulate General		
Nigeria	Abuja	Embassy		
Rwanda	Kigali	Embassy		
São Tomé and Príncipe	São Tomé	Embassy		
Senegal	Dakar	Embassy		
Seychelles	Victoria	Embassy		
Sierra Leone	Freetown	Embassy		
Somalia	Mogadishu	Embassy		
South Africa	Pretoria	Embassy	Countries: Eswatini	
Sudan	Khartoum	Embassy	Countries: South Sudan	
Sudan	Al-Fashir	Consulate-General	Countries: South Sudan	
Tanzania	Dar es Salaam	Embassy		
Togo	Lomé	Embassy		
Tunisia	Tunis	Embassy		
Tunisia	Sfax	Consulate General		
Uganda	Kampala	Embassy		
Zambia	Lusaka	Embassy		

=== Americas ===
Host country	Host city	Mission	Concurrent accreditation	Ref.
Argentina	Buenos Aires	Embassy	Countries: Paraguay; Uruguay	
Brazil	Brasília	Embassy	Countries: Bolivia; Peru	
Canada	Ottawa	Embassy		
Chile	Santiago de Chile	Embassy		
Mexico	Mexico City	Embassy	Countries: Belize	
Nicaragua	Managua	Embassy	Countries: Costa Rica; Ecuador; El Salvador; Honduras	
Panama	Panama City	Embassy	Countries: Bahamas; Cuba; Dominican Republic; Haiti; Jamaica	
Saint Lucia	Castries	Embassy	Countries: Antigua and Barbuda; Barbados; Dominica; Grenada; Saint Kitts and Nevis; Saint Vincent and the Grenadines	
United States	Washington, D.C.	Embassy		
Venezuela	Caracas	Embassy	Countries: Colombia; Guyana; Suriname	

=== Asia ===
Host country	Host city	Mission	Concurrent accreditation	Ref.
Azerbaijan	Baku	Embassy	Countries: Georgia	
Bahrain	Manama	Embassy		
Bangladesh	Dhaka	Embassy		
China	Beijing	Embassy	Countries: Mongolia	
India	New Delhi	Embassy	Countries: Bhutan; Maldives; Nepal	
Indonesia	Jakarta	Embassy	Countries: Brunei; Singapore; Timor-Leste; International Organizations: Association of Southeast Asian Nations	
Iran	Tehran	Embassy		
Iraq	Baghdad	Embassy		
Japan	Tokyo	Embassy	Countries: Marshall Islands; Micronesia	
Jordan	Amman	Embassy		
Kazakhstan	Astana	Embassy	Countries: Kyrgyzstan	
Kuwait	Kuwait City	Embassy		
Malaysia	Kuala Lumpur	Embassy	Countries: Cambodia	
Oman	Muscat	Embassy		
Pakistan	Islamabad	Embassy	Countries: Afghanistan	
Philippines	Manila	Embassy	Countries: Palau	
Qatar	Doha	Embassy		
Saudi Arabia	Riyadh	Embassy	Countries: Yemen	
Saudi Arabia	Jeddah	Consulate-General	Countries: Yemen	
South Korea	Seoul	Embassy	Countries: North Korea	
Sri Lanka	Colombo	Embassy		
Syria	Damascus	Embassy	Countries: Lebanon	
Thailand	Bangkok	Embassy	Countries: Myanmar	
Turkey	Ankara	Embassy		
Turkey	Istanbul	Consulate General		
Turkmenistan	Ashgabat	Embassy		
United Arab Emirates	Abu Dhabi	Embassy		
United Arab Emirates	Dubai	Consulate-General		
Vietnam	Hanoi	Embassy	Countries: Laos	

=== Europe ===
Host country	Host city	Mission	Concurrent accreditation	Ref.
Albania	Tirana	Embassy	Countries: Kosovo	
Austria	Vienna	Embassy	International Organizations: United Nations	
Belarus	Minsk	Embassy		
Belgium	Brussels	Embassy	Countries: Luxembourg	
Bosnia and Herzegovina	Sarajevo	Embassy		
Bulgaria	Sofia	Embassy		
Croatia	Zagreb	Embassy		
Cyprus	Nicosia	Embassy		
Czech Republic	Prague	Embassy		
Denmark	Copenhagen	Embassy	Countries: Norway	
France	Paris	Embassy	Countries: Monaco	
France	Marseille	Consulate-General	Countries: Monaco	
Germany	Berlin	Embassy		
Germany	Düsseldorf	Consulate-General		
Greece	Athens	Embassy		
Holy See	Rome (Note: The Libyan Embassy to the Holy See is located outside Vatican territory in Rome.)	Embassy	Sovereign Entity: Sovereign Military Order of Malta	
Hungary	Budapest	Embassy		
Italy	Rome	Embassy	Countries: San Marino; Slovenia	
Italy	Milan	Consulate-General	Countries: San Marino; Slovenia	
Italy	Palermo	Consulate-General	Countries: San Marino; Slovenia	
Malta	Valletta (Note: Although officially titled as an embassy in Valletta, its chancery and consular section are physically located in the nearby towns of Balzan and Ta' Xbiex, respectively.)	Embassy		
Netherlands	The Hague	Embassy		
Poland	Warsaw	Embassy		
Portugal	Lisbon	Embassy		
Romania	Bucharest	Embassy		
Russia	Moscow	Embassy	Countries: Moldova; Armenia; Tajikistan	
Serbia	Belgrade	Embassy	Countries: Montenegro; North Macedonia	
Slovakia	Bratislava	Embassy		
Spain	Madrid	Embassy	Countries: Andorra	
Sweden	Stockholm	Embassy	Countries: Estonia; Finland; Iceland; Latvia; Lithuania	
Switzerland	Bern	Embassy	Countries: Liechtenstein	
Ukraine	Kyiv	Embassy		
United Kingdom	London	Embassy	Countries: Ireland; International Organizations: International Maritime Organization	
United Kingdom	Manchester	Consulate-General	Countries: Ireland; International Organizations: International Maritime Organization	

=== Oceania ===
Host country	Host city	Mission	Concurrent accreditation	Ref.
Australia	Canberra	Embassy	Countries: Fiji; Kiribati; New Zealand; Papua New Guinea; Samoa; Solomon Islands; Tonga; Tuvalu; Vanuatu	

=== Multilateral organisations ===
Organization	Host city	Host country	Mission	Concurrent accreditation	Ref.
Food and Agriculture Organization	Rome	Italy	Permanent Mission		
European Union	Brussels	Belgium	Permanent Mission		
United Nations	New York City	United States	Permanent Mission	Countries: Guatemala	
United Nations	Geneva	Switzerland	Permanent Mission		
UNESCO	Paris	France	Permanent Mission		

== Missions to Open ==
Host country	Host city	Mission	Ref.
Cuba	Havana	Embassy	
Ireland	Dublin	Embassy	
Yemen	Sanaa	Embassy	
Yemen	Aden	Consulate General	
Zimbabwe	Harare	Embassy (Note: To be reopened.)	

== Gallery ==
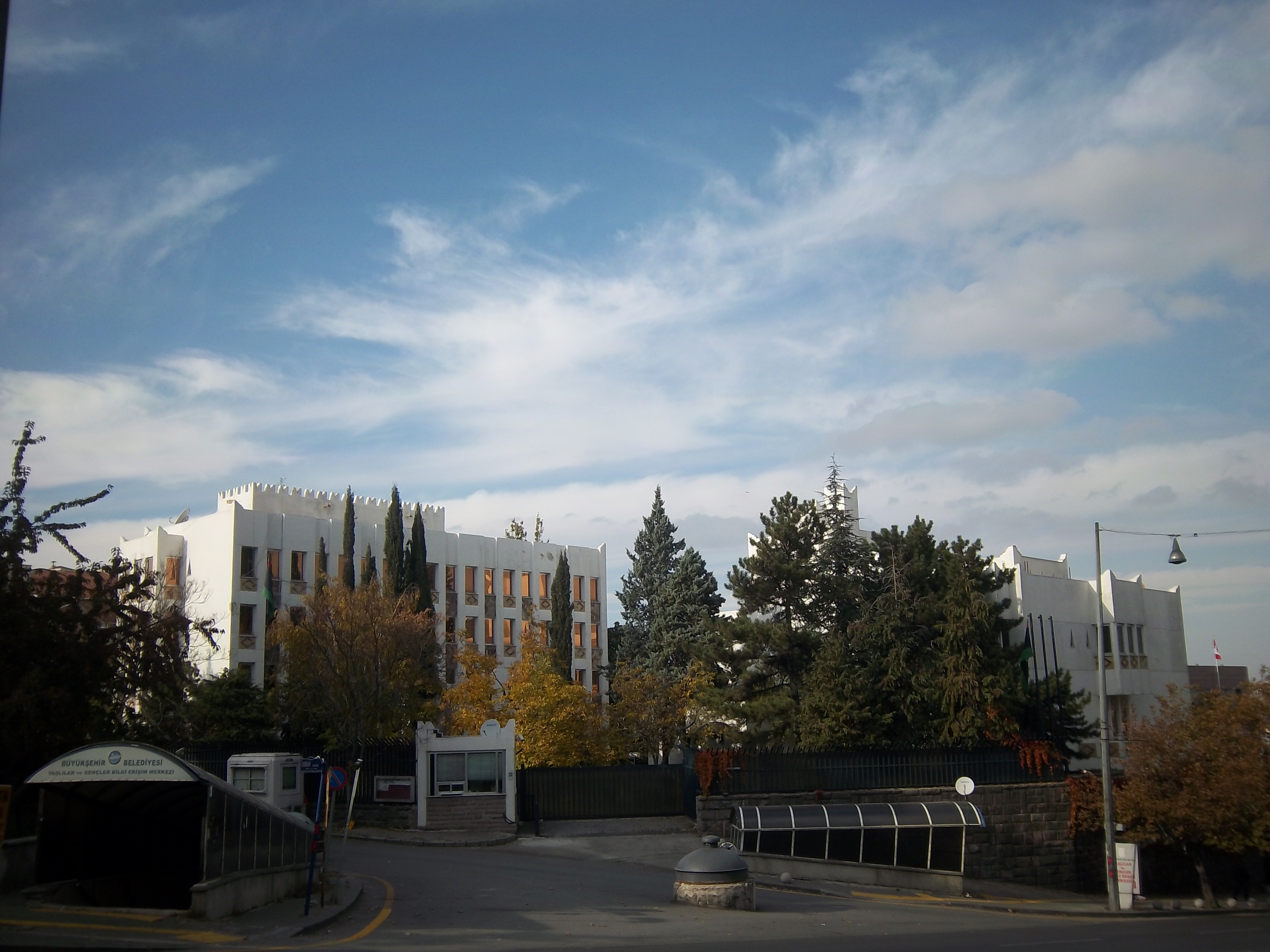
Embassy in Ankara

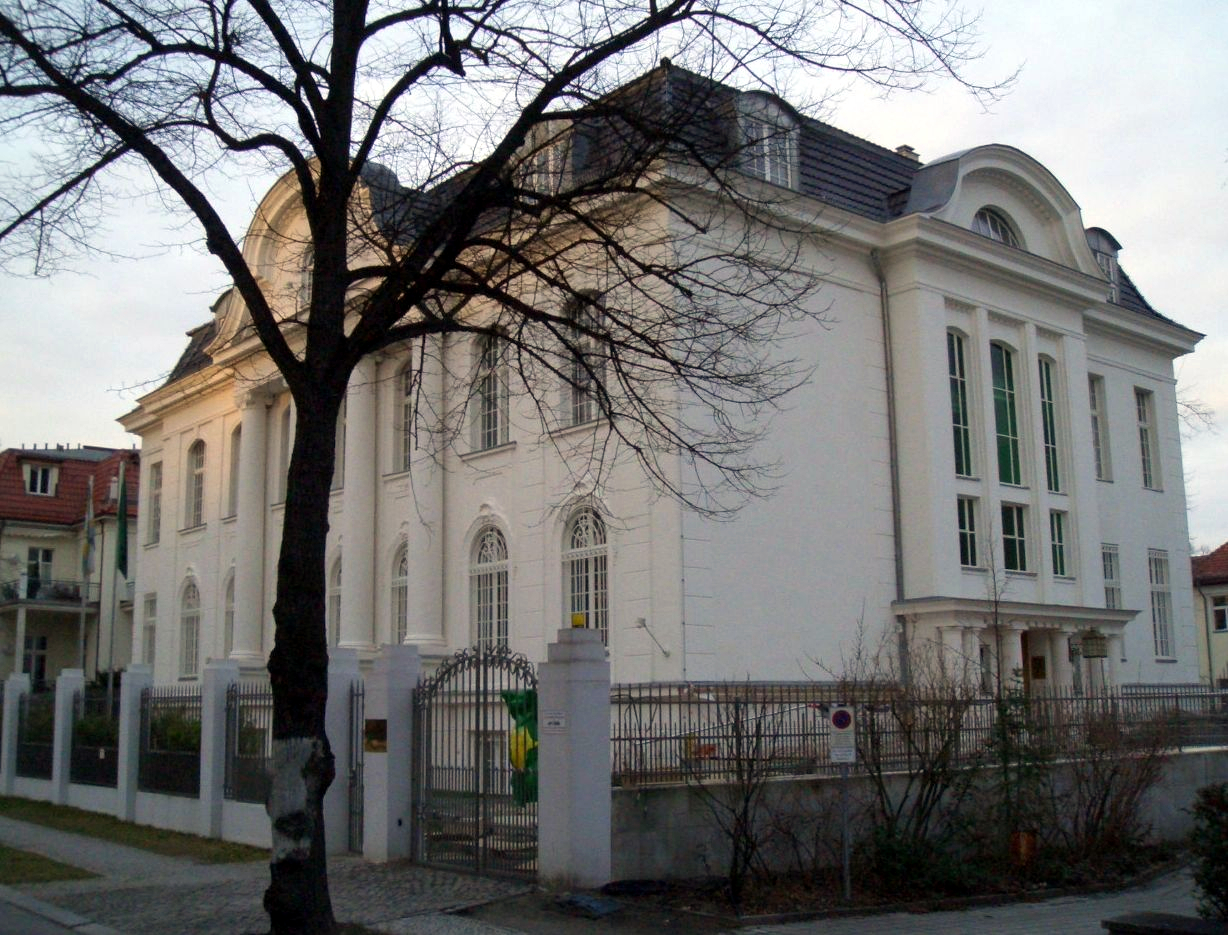
Embassy in Berlin

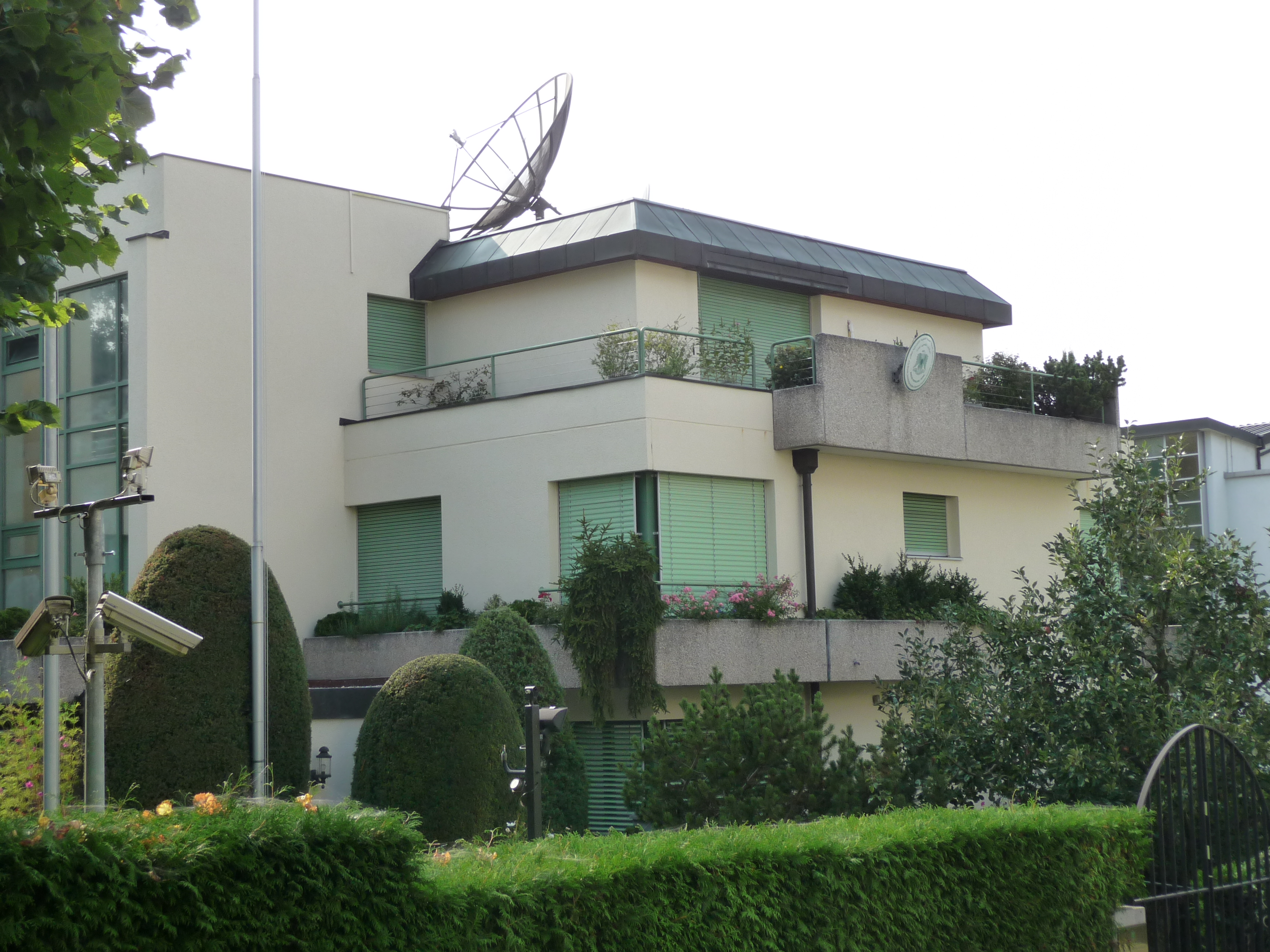
Embassy in Bern

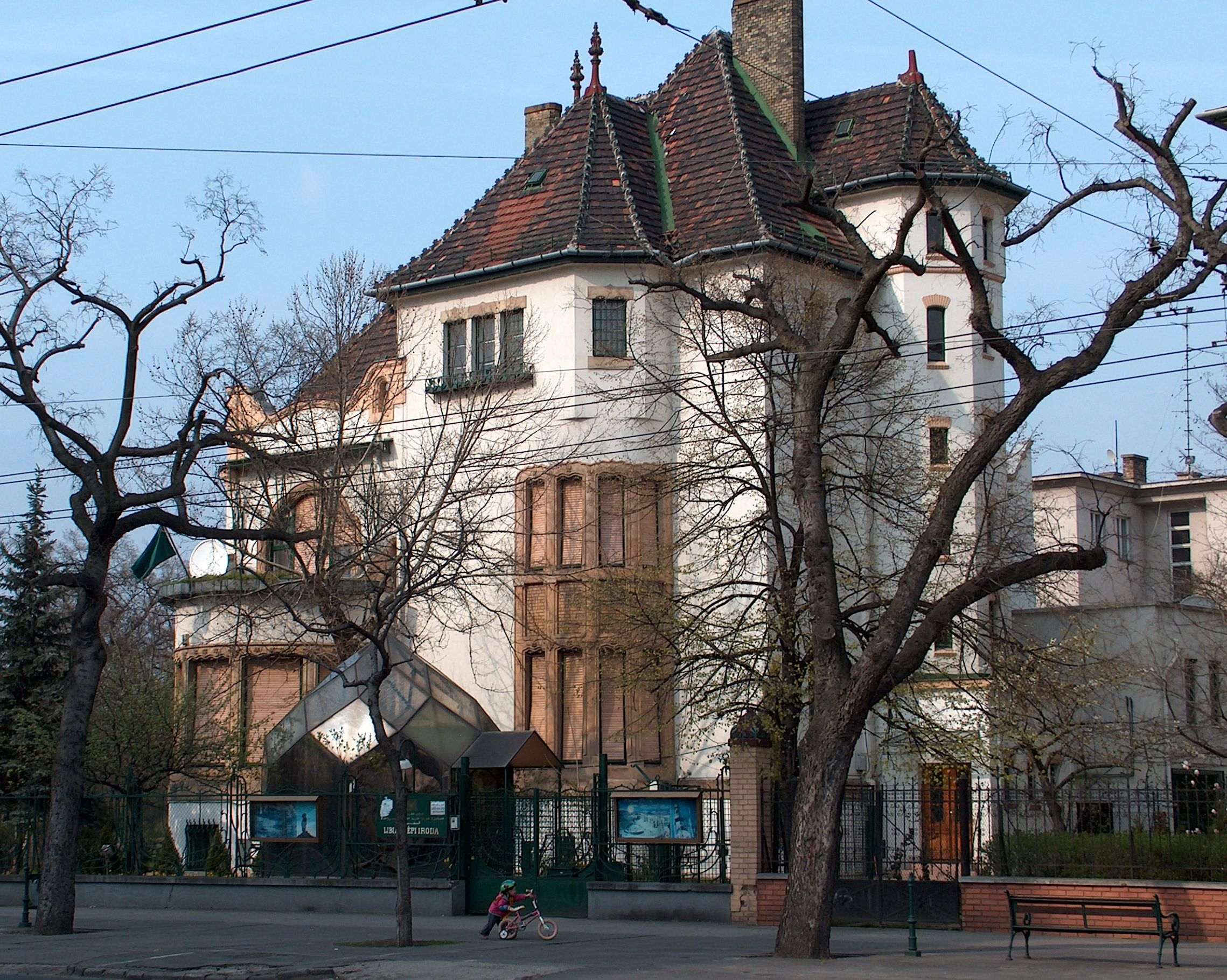
Embassy in Budapest

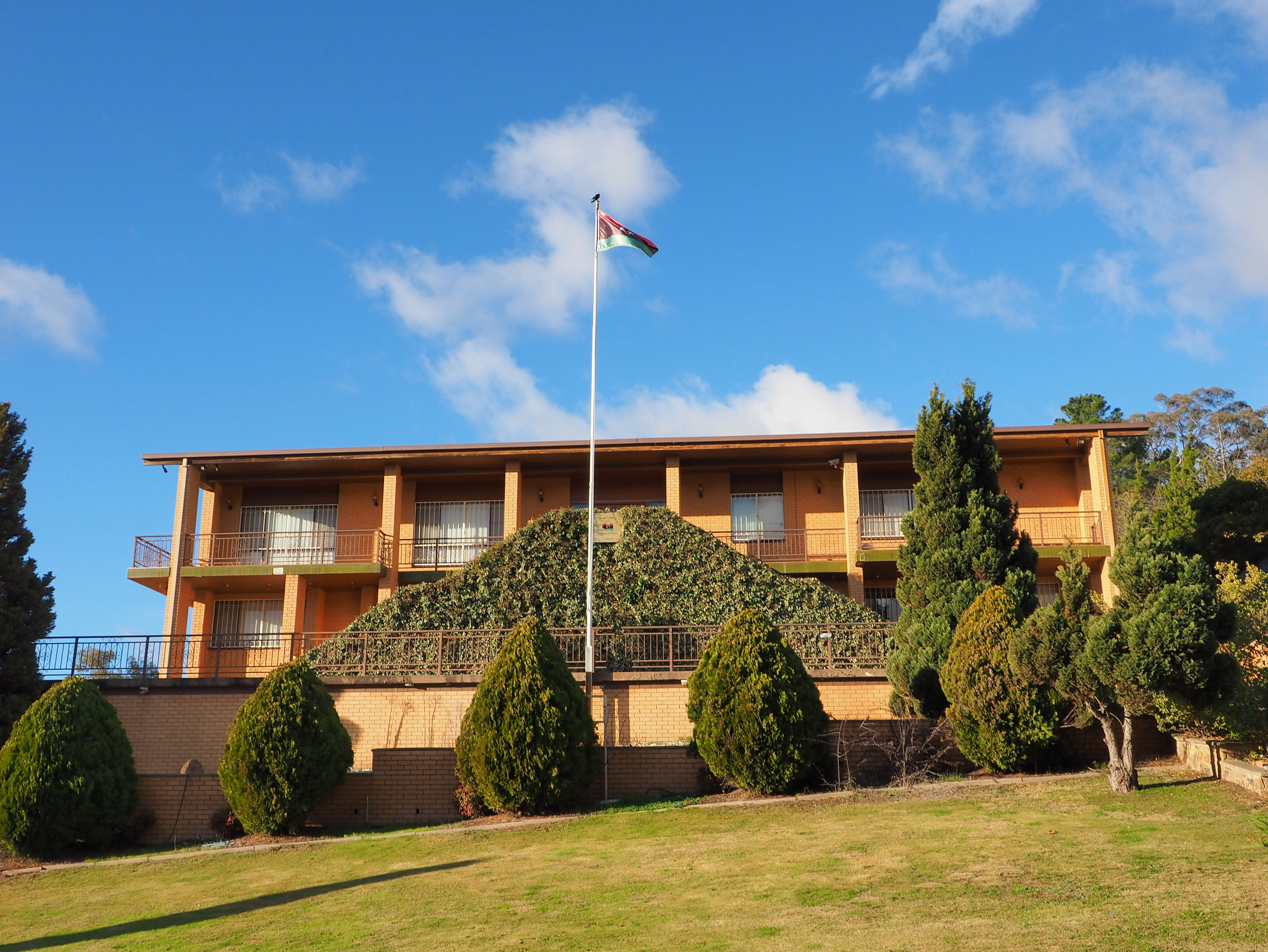
Embassy in Canberra

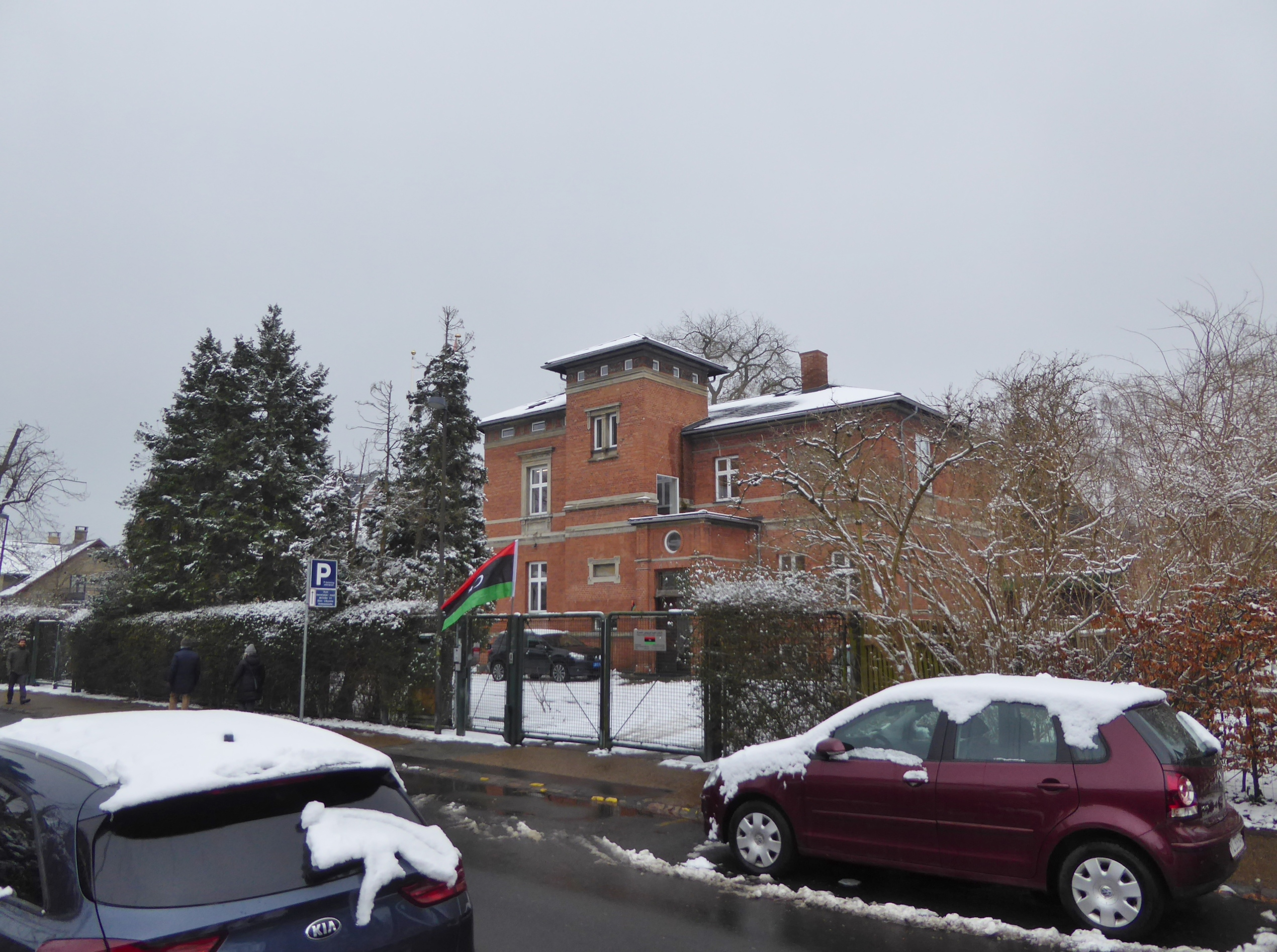
Embassy in Copenhagen

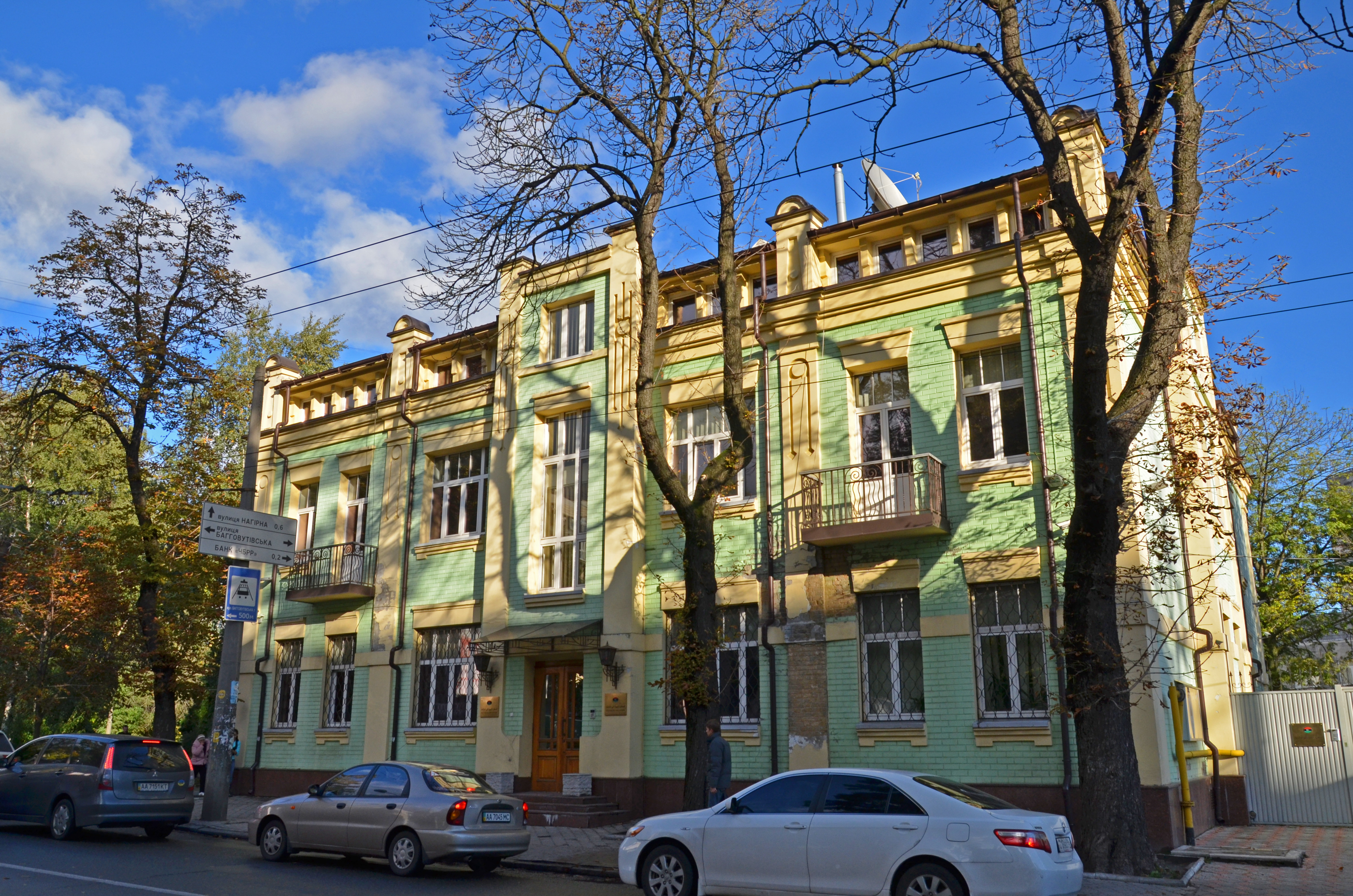
Embassy in Kiev

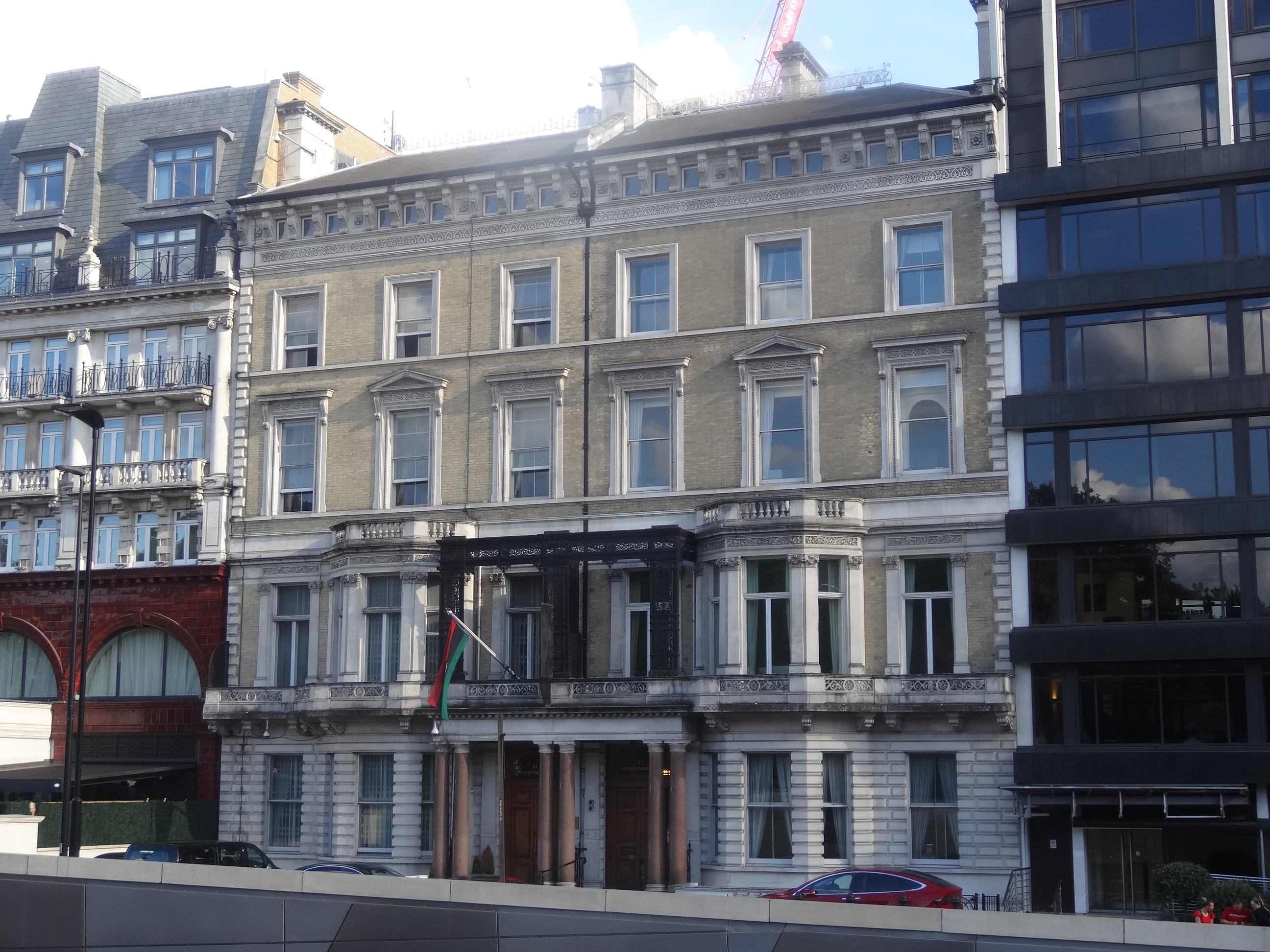
Embassy in London

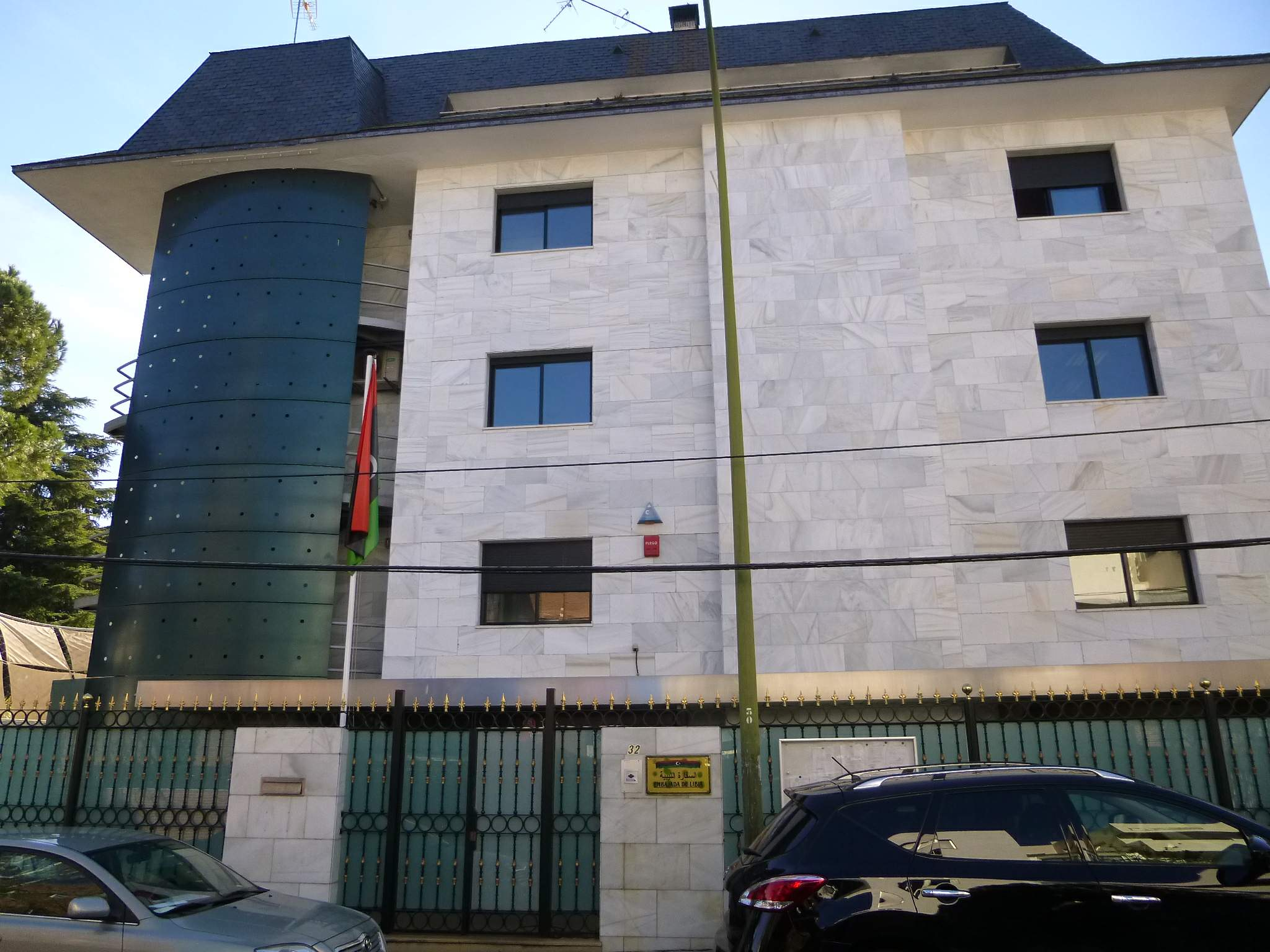
Embassy in Madrid

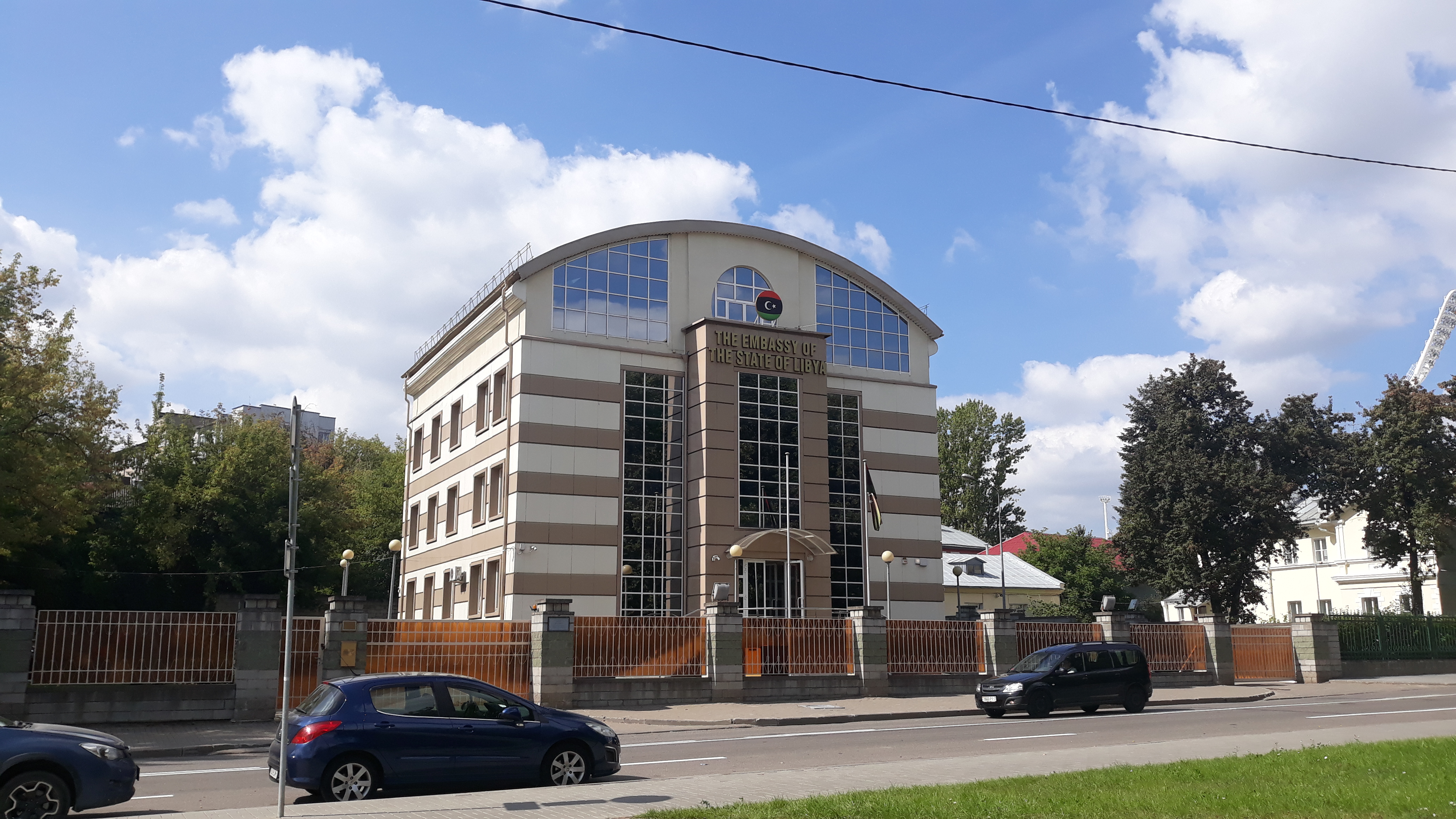
Embassy in Minsk

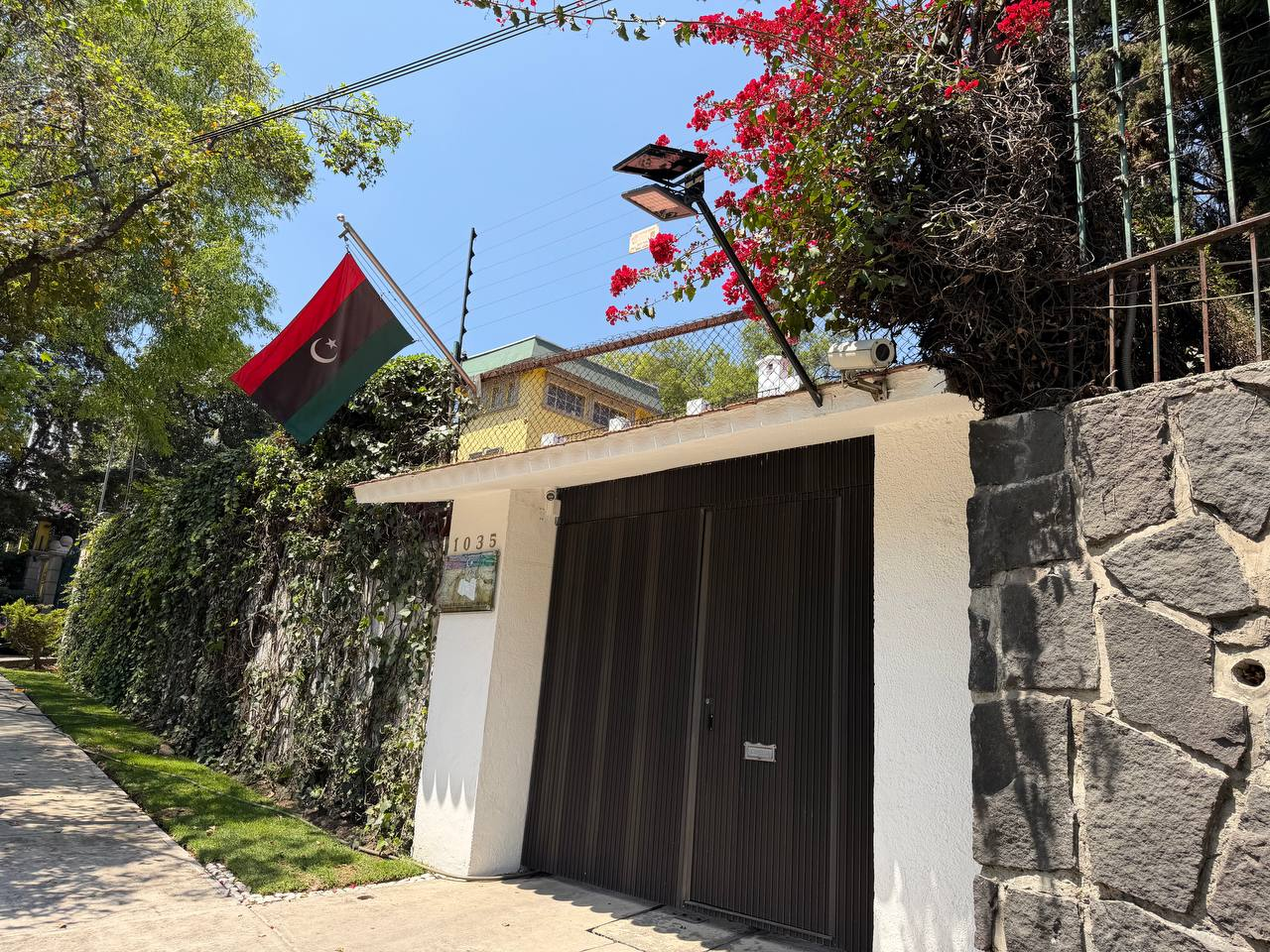
Embassy in Mexico City

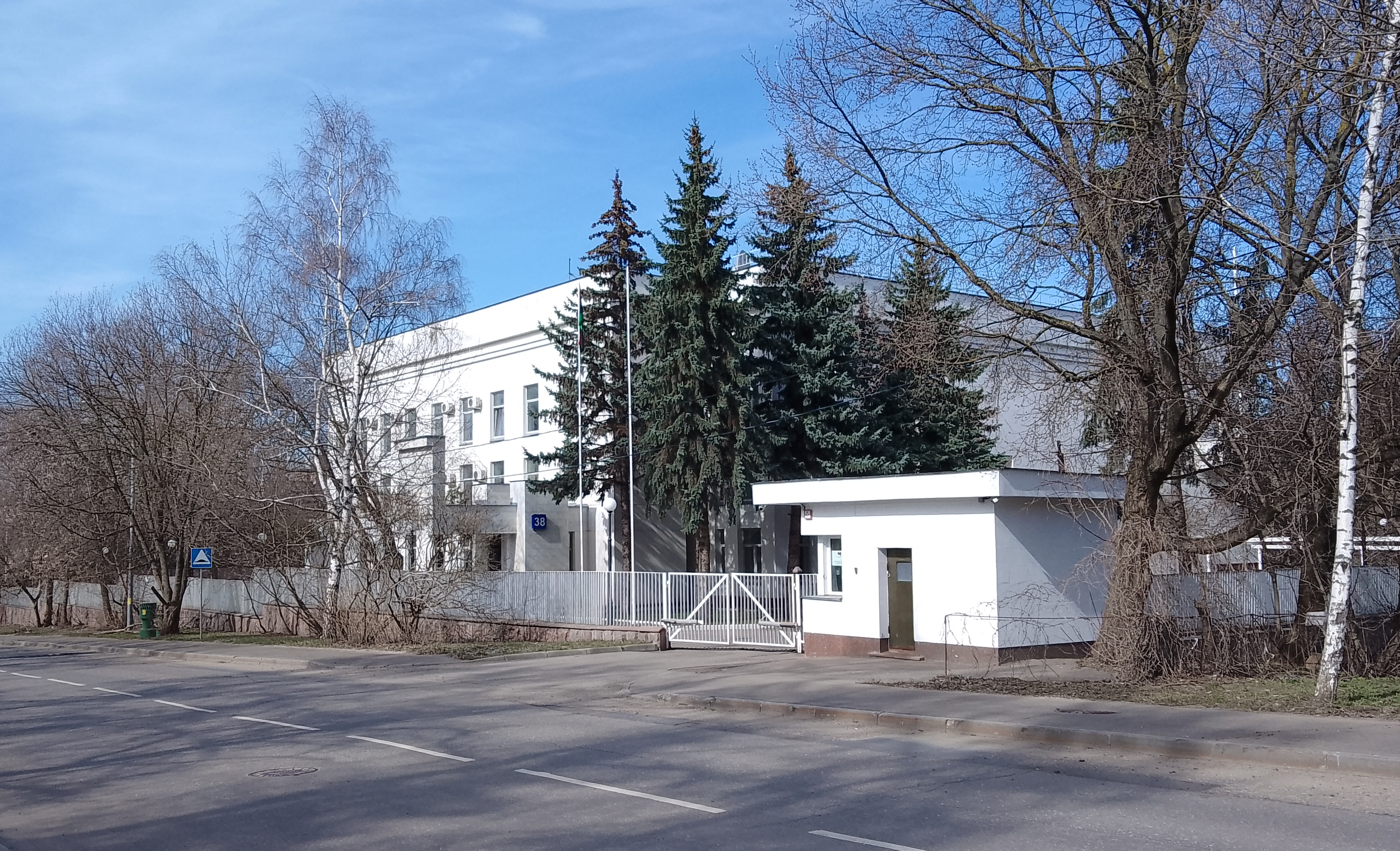
Embassy in Moscow

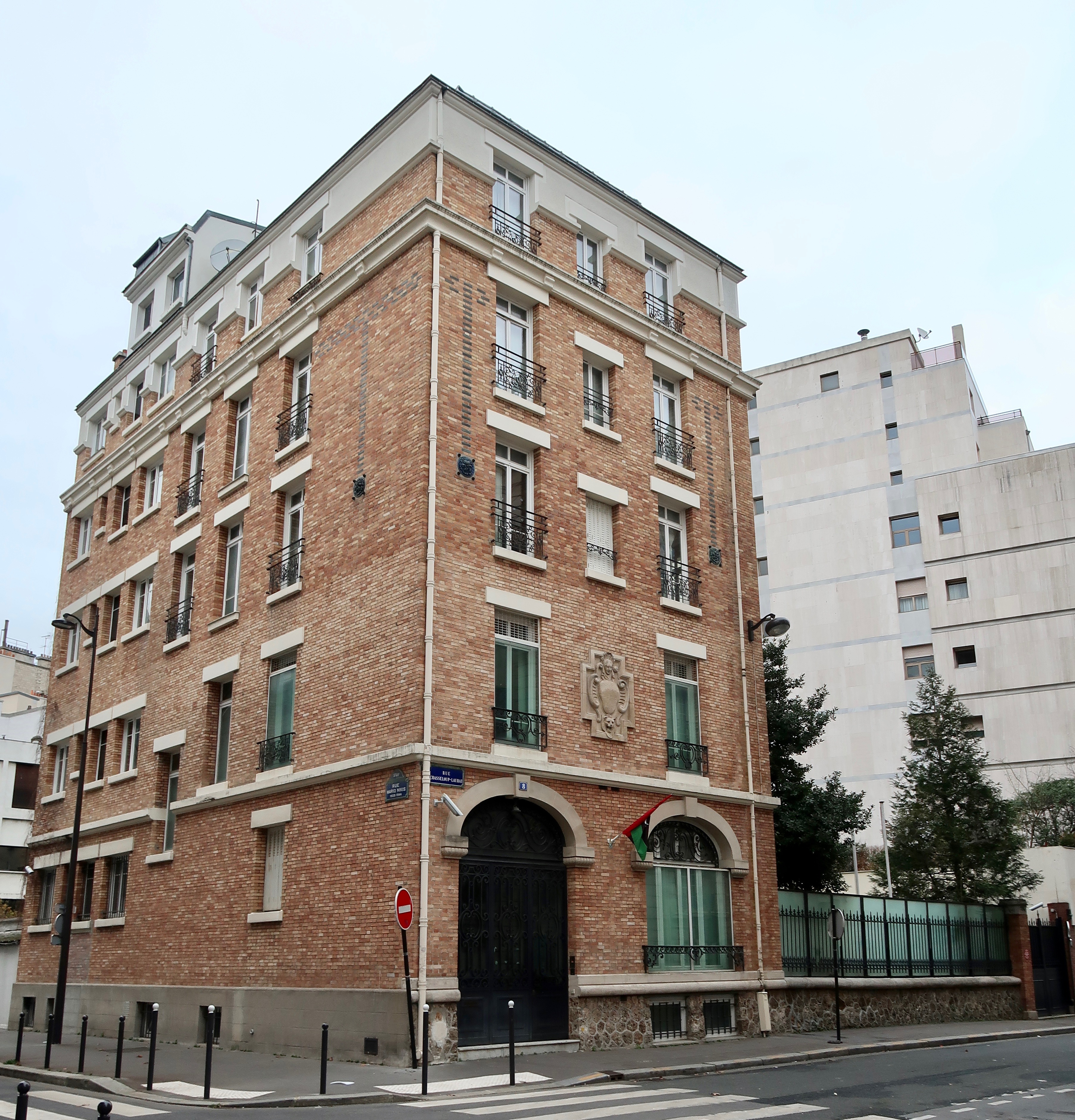
Embassy in Paris

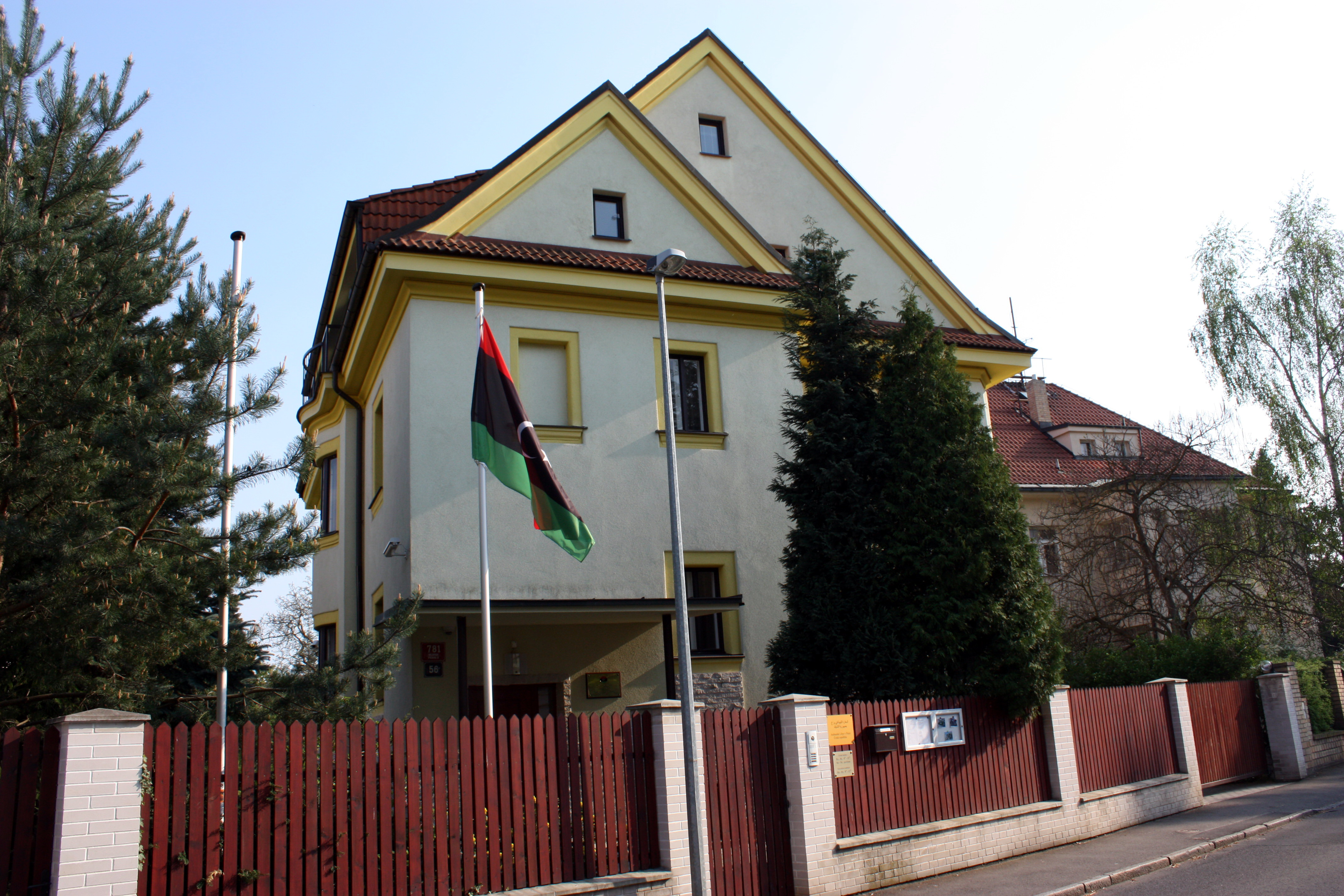
Embassy in Prague

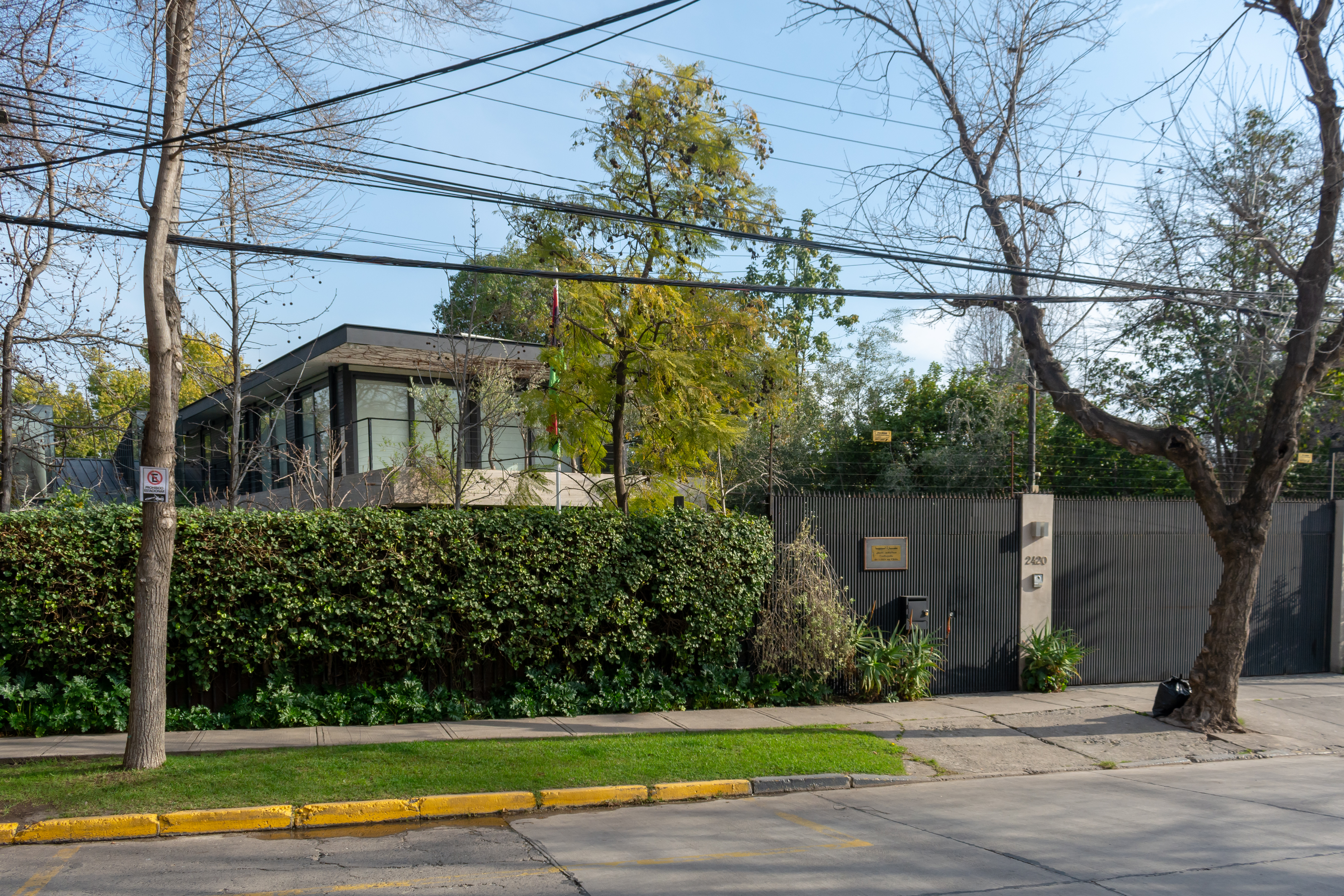
Embassy in Santiago de Chile

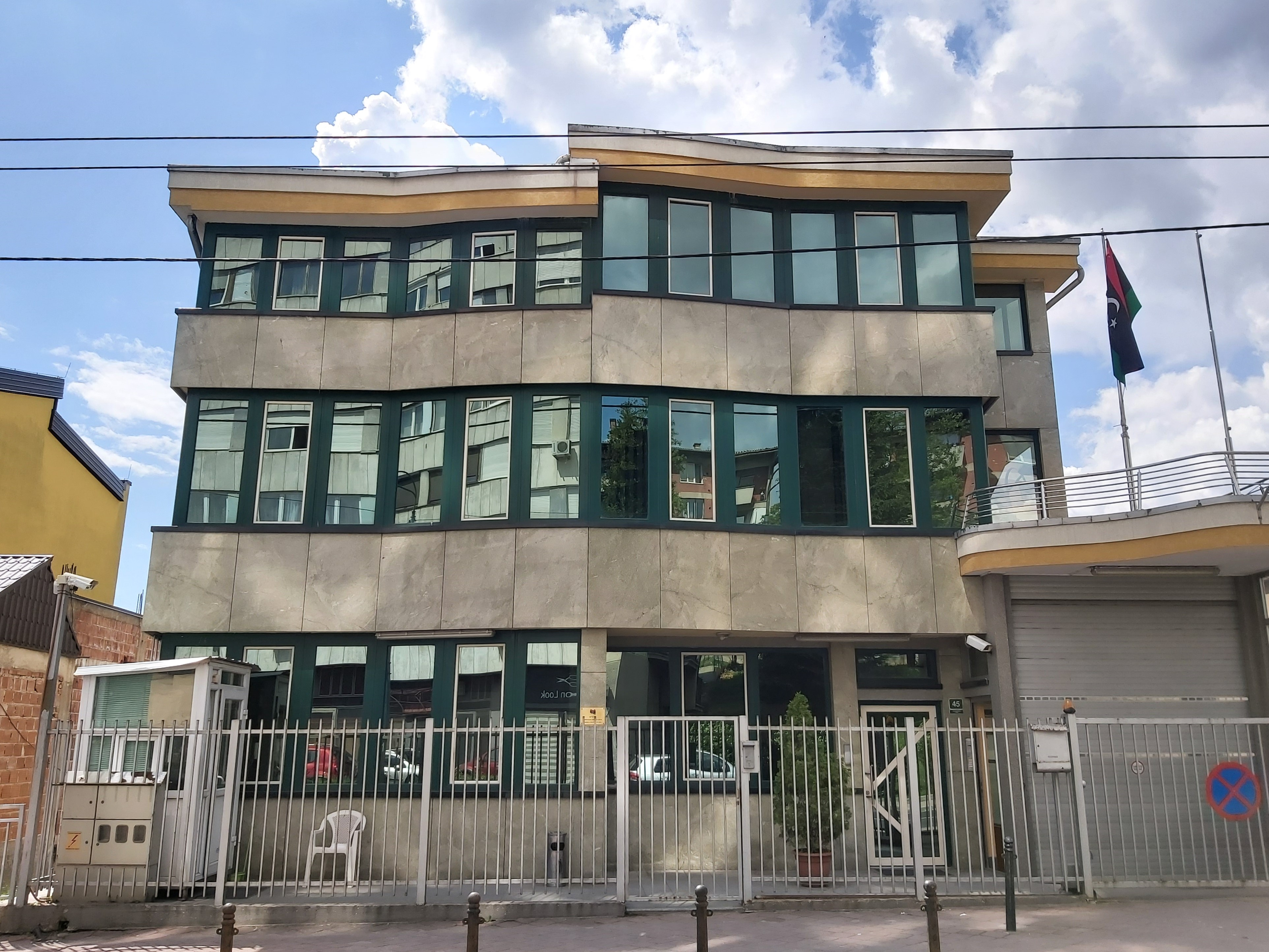
Embassy in Sarajevo

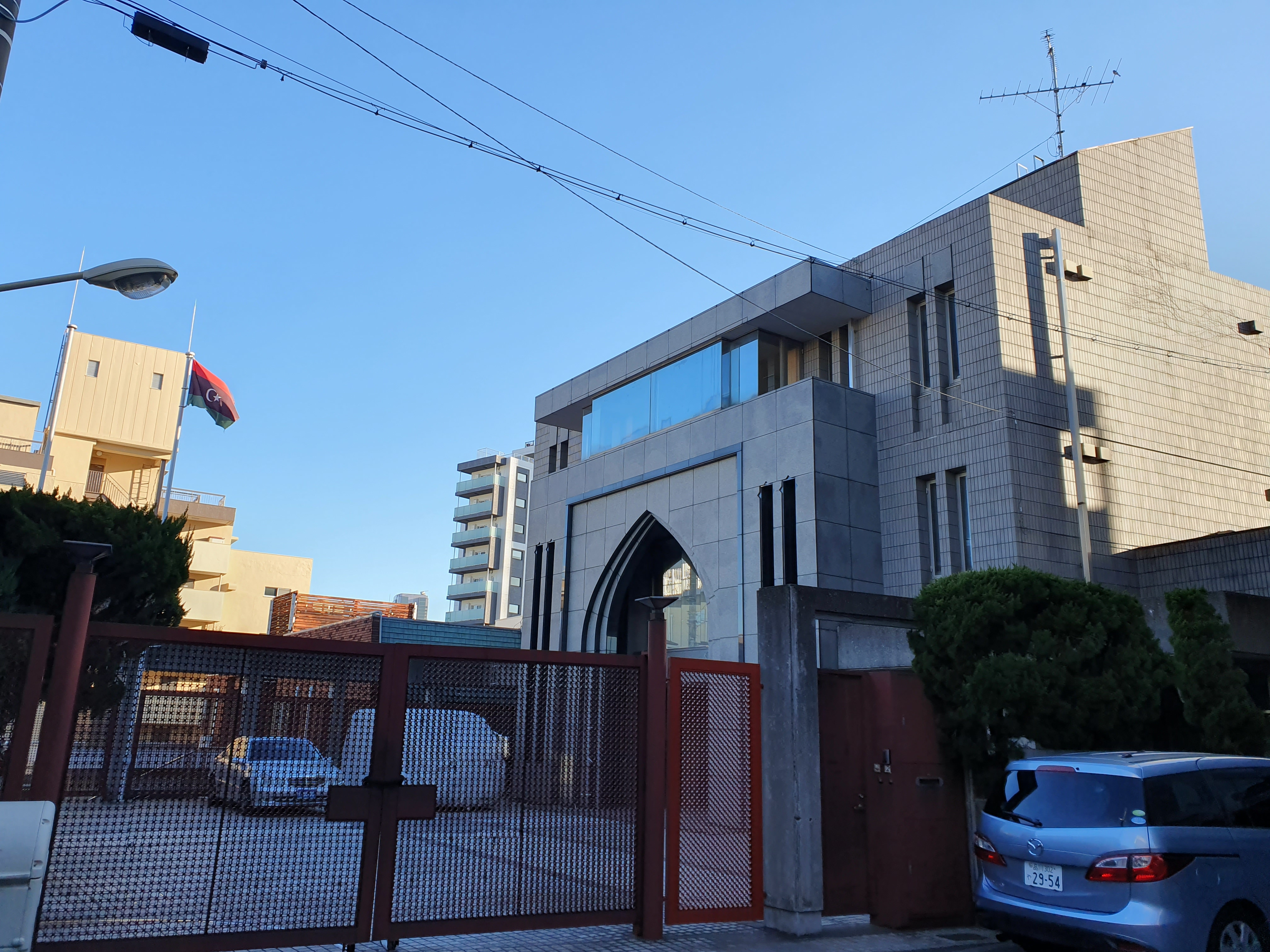
Embassy in Tokyo

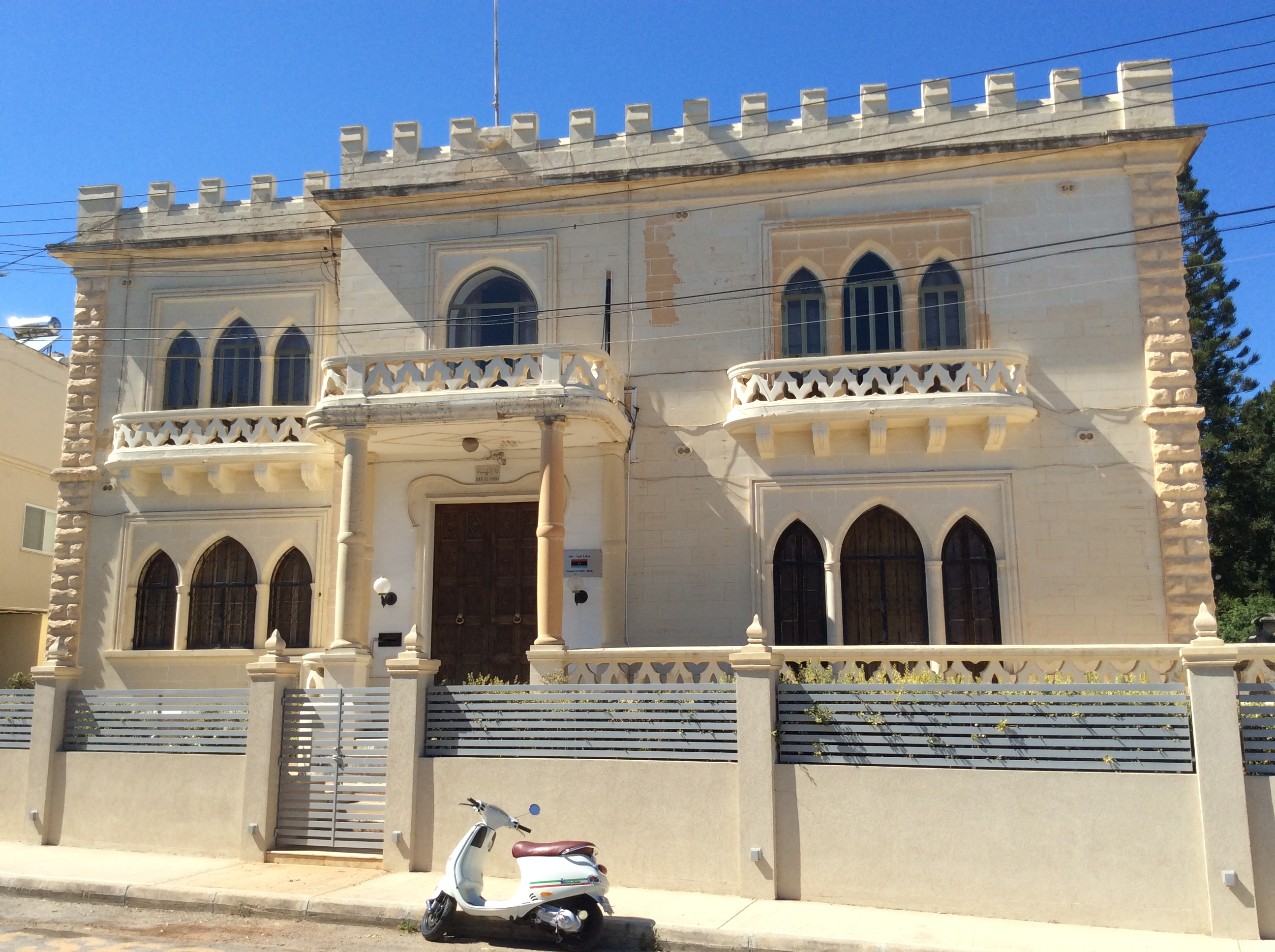
Embassy in Valletta

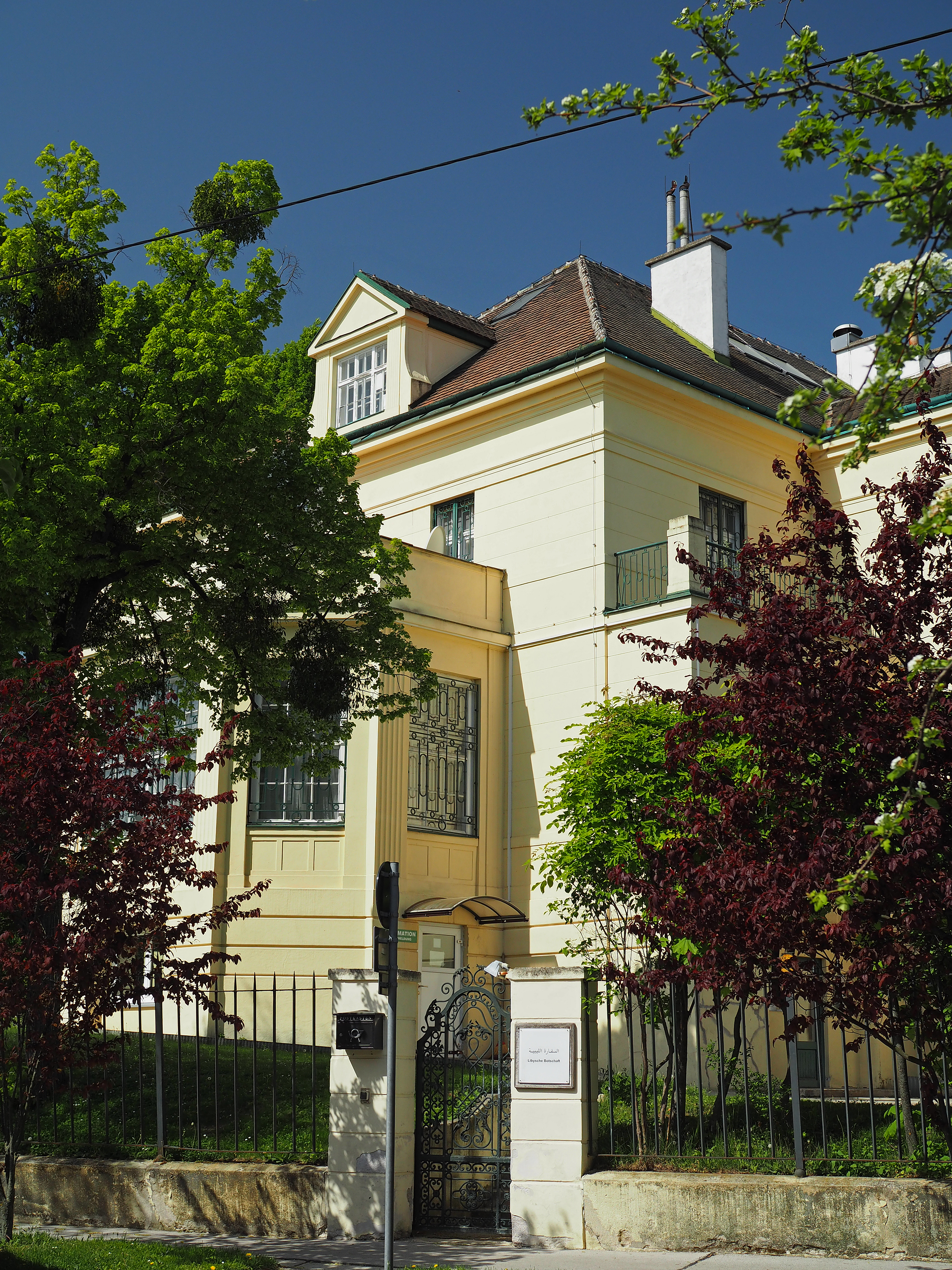
Embassy in Vienna

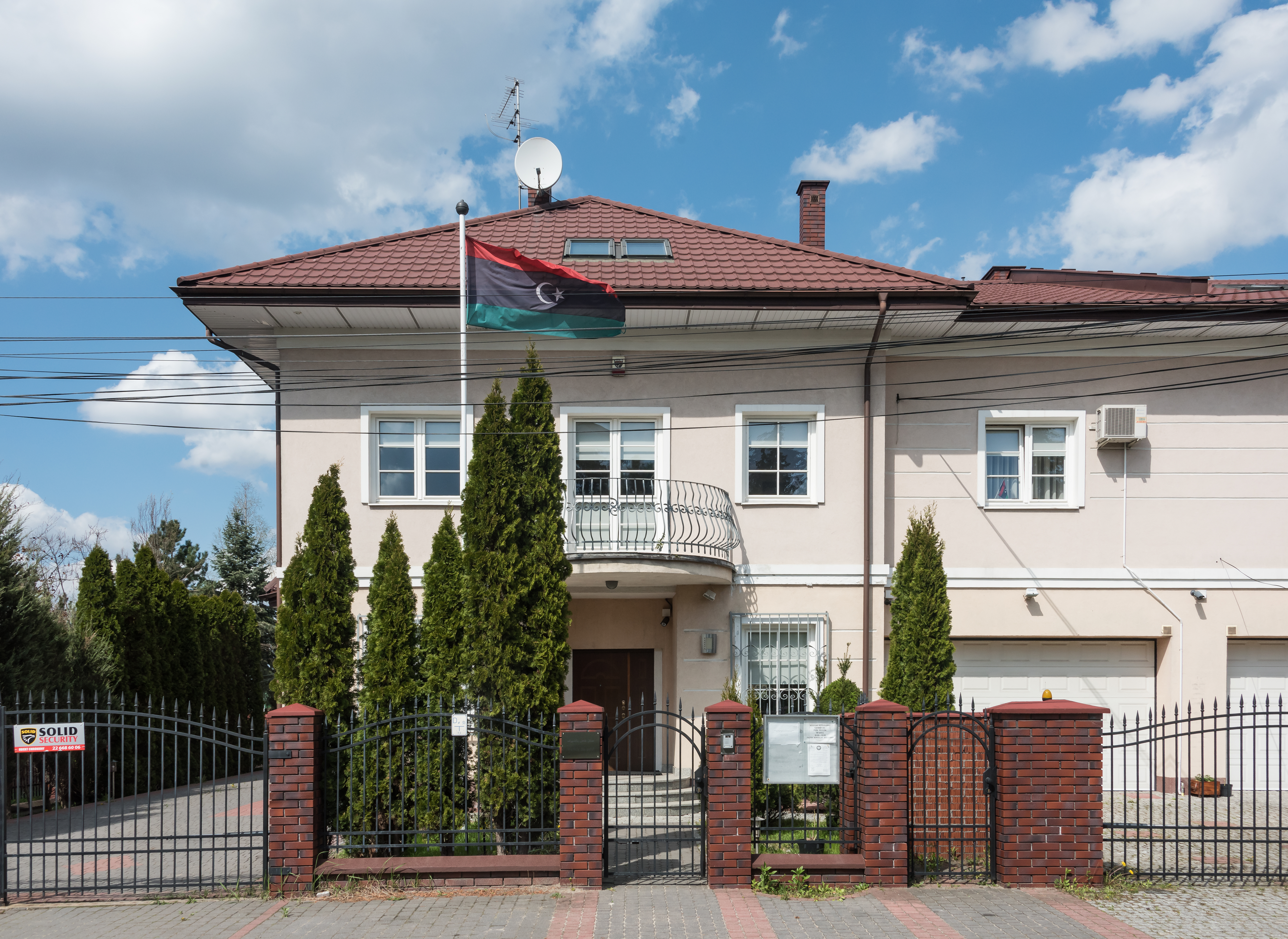
Embassy in Warsaw

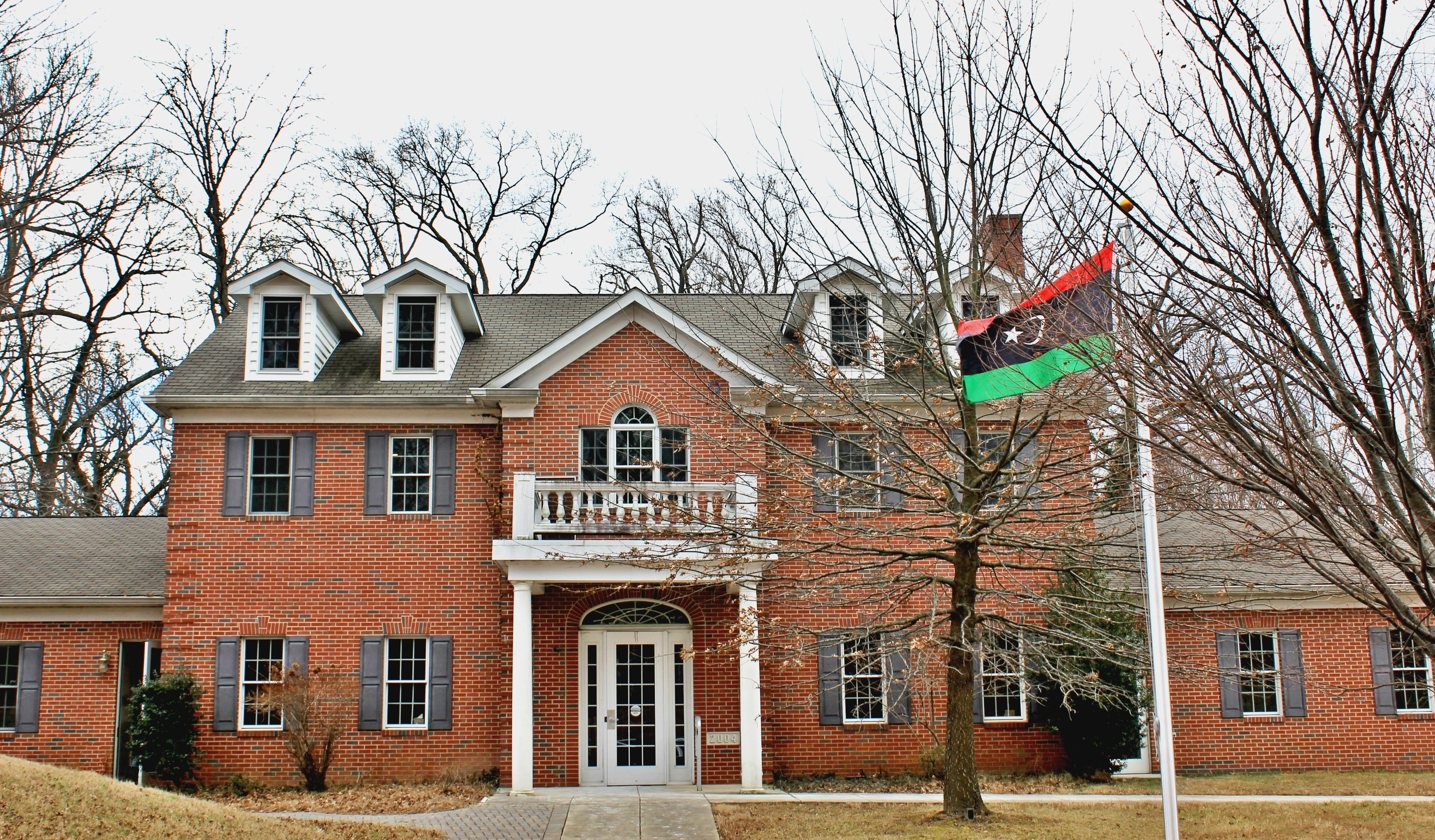
Embassy in Washington, D.C.

== Closed missions ==
=== Africa ===
Host country	Host city	Mission	Year closed	Ref.
Algeria	Annaba	Consulate General	1998	
Egypt	Marsa Matruh	Consulate	1977	
Malawi	Lilongwe	Embassy (Note: Closed because of Gaddafi's government is overthrown.)	2011	
Sudan	Juba	Consulate (Note: Closed because of South Sudan's independence.)	2011	
Sudan	Port Sudan	Consulate General	2000	
Zimbabwe	Harare	Embassy	2011	

=== Americas ===
Host country	Host city	Mission	Year closed	Ref.
Bolivia	La Paz	Embassy (Note: Resident in Brasília, Distrito Federal, Brazil)	2011	
Cuba	Havana	Embassy (Note: Resident in Panama City, Panama)	2011	
Ecuador	Quito	Embassy (Note: Resident in Managua, Nicaragua)	2011	
United States	New York City	Consular Office	1995	

=== Asia ===
Host country	Host city	Mission	Year closed	Ref.
Afghanistan	Kabul	Embassy (Note: Resident in Islamabad, Pakistan)	2009	
Lebanon	Beirut	Embassy	2003	
North Korea	Pyongyang	Embassy	2013	
South Vietnam	Saigon	Embassy	1969	
Syria	Aleppo	Consulate General	2001	
Republic of China (Taiwan)	Taipei	Embassy	1971	
Yemen	Sanaa	Embassy (Note: Resident in Riyadh, Saudi Arabia)	2015	
Yemen	Aden	Consulate General	2015	

=== Europe ===
Host country	Host city	Mission	Year closed	Ref.
East Germany (Note: Libya closed its embassies in Bonn and East Berlin upon the reunification of Germany in 1990, which saw the dissolution of the Democratic Republic of Germany, and a single embassy was established in Berlin.)	East Berlin	Embassy	1990	
Finland	Helsinki	Embassy	2003	
West Germany	Bonn	Embassy	1990	

== See also ==
- Foreign relations of Libya
- List of diplomatic missions in Libya
- Visa policy of Libya
