= Libyan passport =

Passport issued to citizens of Libya

Libyan Passport; Arabic: جَوَازُ ٱلسَّفَرِ ٱللِّيبِيُّ, romanized: Jawāz As-Safar Al-Lībiyy
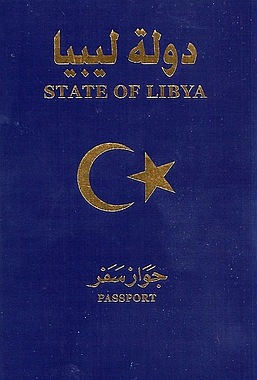
- Front cover of the current Libyan passport (with MRZ), issued since 2014
- Type: Passport
- Issued by: Libya
- First issued: 2014 (Machine-readable passport MRP)
- Purpose: Identification, International Travel
- Valid in: All countries except Israel
- Eligibility: Libyan citizenship
- Expiration: 8 years
- Cost: 50.5 LYD Issue/Renewal, 1000 LYD Damaged/Lost

The Libyan passport (Arabic: جَوَازُ ٱلسَّفَرِ ٱللِّيبِيُّ, romanized: Jawāz As-Safar Al-Lībiyy) is issued to citizens of Libya for international travel & identification. It is valid for 8 years for all ages. Its MRP(Machine-readable passport) version has been available since 2014.

== History ==
The Libyan passport design has been changed at least 5 or 6 times. The passport was most recently redesigned in 2014, following the killing of Muammar Gaddafi and subsequent regime change.

=== Kingdom of Libya ===
During the last days of the Kingdom of Libya, the Libyan passport was valid to the countries shown below:

All Arab countries, Pakistan, Chad, Niger, Nigeria, Ghana, Somaliland, Ethiopia, Cyprus, Malta, India, Japan, the Republic of China (Taiwan), Turkey, Greece, Yugoslavia, Italy, Switzerland, Austria, (West) Germany, France, Spain, the Netherlands, Belgium, Luxembourg, the United Kingdom, Denmark, Sweden, Norway, and the United States.

The color of the passport was black and featured the monarchy's emblem in the middle.

=== Libyan Arab Republic ===
After the overthrow of the monarchy and the establishment of a republic by Gaddafi on 1 September 1969, the Libyan passport had over time become valid to People's Republic of Bulgaria, Czechoslovakia, the Soviet Union, and Romania.

The color of the passport was black and featured the Eagle of Saladin in the middle.

=== Libyan Arab Jamahiriya ===
In the early 1990s, the Libyan passport was valid to all countries in the world, except South Africa, and occupied Palestine.

Later on after the Apartheid was abolished in South Africa, the Libyan passport started being valid to use for travel to South Africa as well.

The color of the passport was green, representing Libya's past flag, and features the Hawk of Quraish in the middle.

=== State of Libya ===
After the 2011 civil war, work started on a newer blue Passport which was the first Passport that is Machine-readable Passport MRP, that was introduced in 2014.

The color of the passport is blue and features a star and crescent, an emblem on the current flag and symbol of Islam.

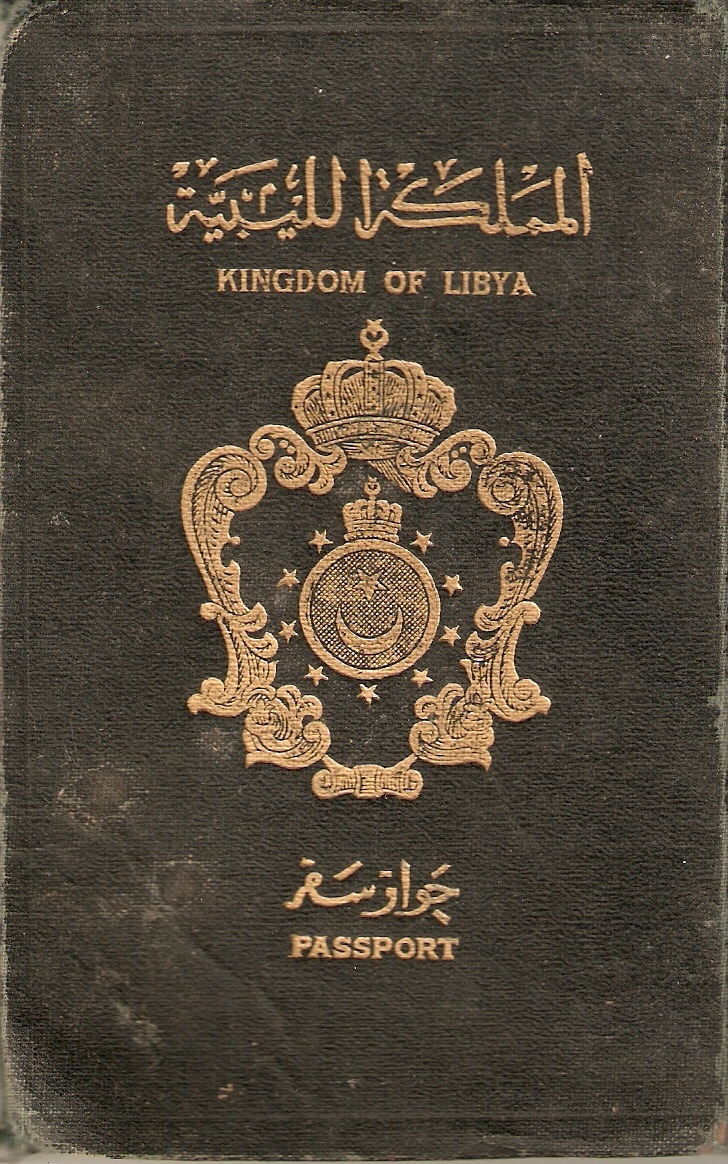
Passport of the Kingdom of Libya (1951–1969)

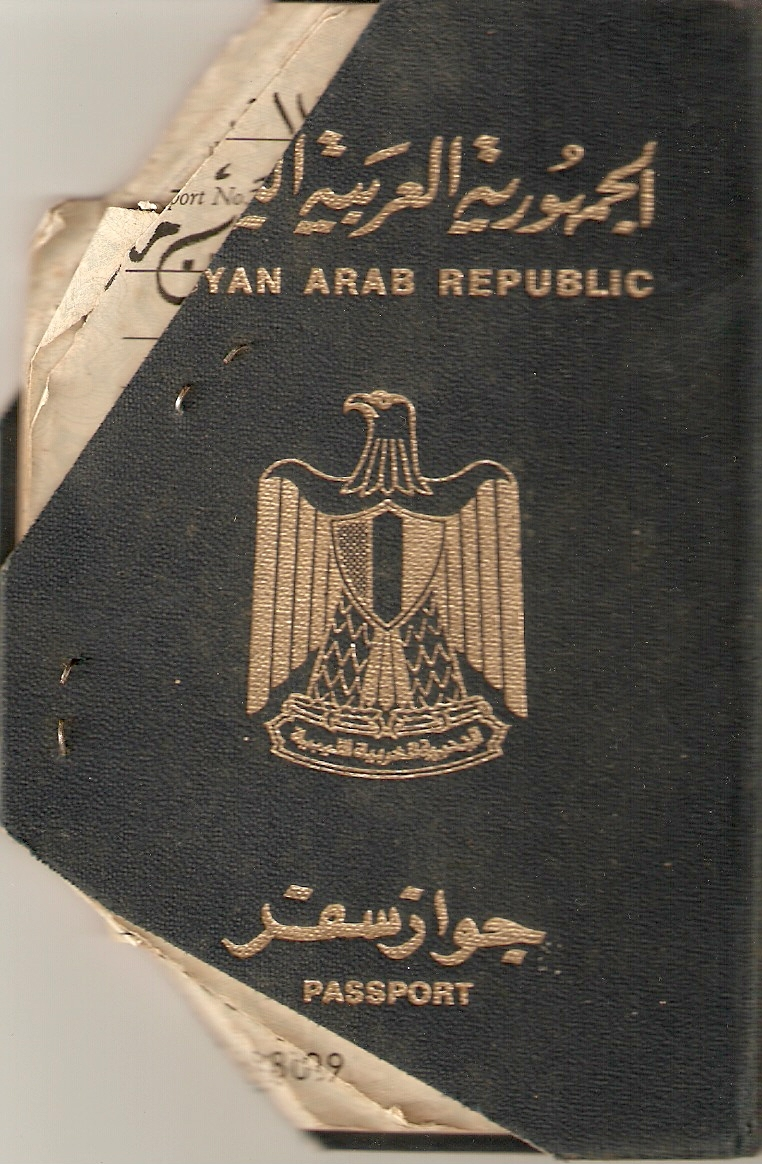
Passport of the Libyan Arab Republic (1969–1977)

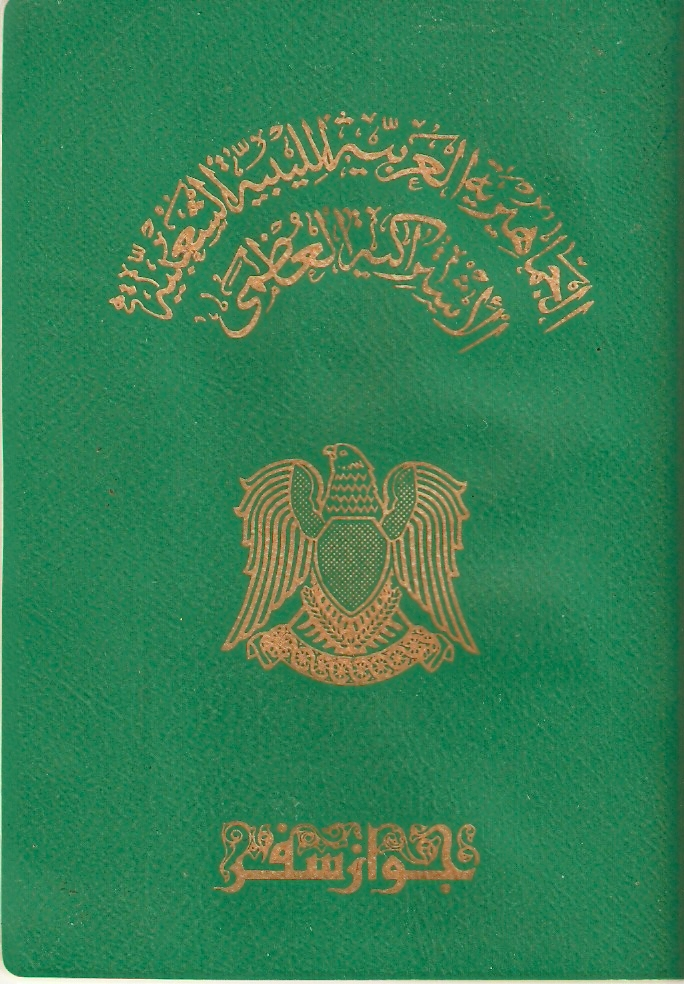
Passport of the Great Socialist People's Libyan Arab Jamahiriya (1977–2014)

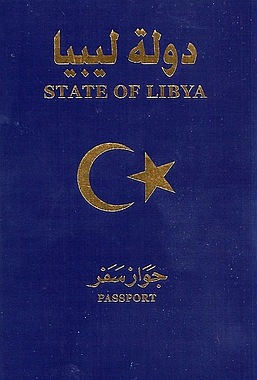
Passport of the State of Libya (2014-present)

== Visa requirements ==
Visa requirements for Libyan citizens holding ordinary passports Libya Visa not required/eTA Visa on arrival eVisa Visa available both on arrival or online Visa required

As of April 2025, Libyan citizens had visa-free or visa on arrival access to 40 countries and territories, ranking the Libyan passport 97th in the world in terms of travel freedom (tied with the passports of Palestine and Bangladesh) according to the Henley Passport Index.

== See also ==
- Visa requirements for Libyan citizens
