= Visa policy of South Ossetia =

Policy on permits required to enter South Ossetia

South Ossetia does not issue visas. However, visitors are required to receive approval from the South Ossetian government in advance of their visit unless they are citizens of exempt country. South Ossetia may only be entered through Russia. Visitors are required to hold a valid Russian visa that permits them to return to Russia unless they are Russian citizens or citizens of countries that are exempt from Russian visa requirements.

== Visa policy map ==
Visa policy of South Ossetia South Ossetia Freedom of movement Visa not required (90 days) Entry permit required

== Visa exemption ==
Citizens of the following country and citizens belonging to the members of the Community for Democracy and Rights of Nations may enter South Ossetia without a visa for the following period:

Freedom of movement

- Russia

90 days

- Abkhazia
- Transnistria

These citizens can also enter using an internal passport in lieu of a passport.

A visa exemption agreement between South Ossetia and Nauru was signed on February 3, 2018, that would allow citizens of Nauru to travel to South Ossetia without prior approval and for citizens of South Ossetia to travel to Nauru without a visa, both for up to 90 days within any 180 day period. However, the agreement has yet to be ratified.

== Entry requirements ==
All visitors, except for citizens of exempt countries, must be invited by a party in South Ossetia (a private citizen or a South Ossetian organization, such as a government department or business) prior to their arrival. Inviting parties must submit their invitation letters to the Immigration Control Office of the Ministry of Internal Affairs, which takes up to 30 calendar days to process invitations. Tourists must obtain an invitation from the Committee on Youth Policy, Sports, and Tourism. In addition to an invitation, journalists must receive approval from the State Committee on Information and Press prior to arrival. All visitors must register with the Immigration Control Office of the Ministry of Internal Affairs within three days after their arrival.

== Visitors statistics ==
Approximately 95% of the population of South Ossetia has (in addition to citizenship of the Republic of South Ossetia — State of Alania), citizenship of the Russian Federation, and many of them leave the territory of South Ossetia and enter it with Russian passports, and almost half of them permanently reside in Russia. During the year, most of them leave South Ossetia for Russia many times for various purposes and enter back. Even from Russian citizens by birth, South Ossetia is mostly visited by Russian citizens living mainly in Republic of North Ossetia–Alania (part of the Russian Federation). From the rest of the Russian Federation, an extremely small number of citizens of the Russian Federation visit South Ossetia.

Citizens of the Russian Federation

Country	2021	2020	2019	2018	2017	2016	2015	2014	2013	2012	2011	2010
Russia	▲381,473	▼206,260	▼407,694	▼443,646	▲451,918	▼450,753	▼472,443	▲502,108	▼500,682	▼511,715	▼528,223	537,080

== See also ==
- Visa requirements for South Ossetian citizens
- International recognition of Abkhazia and South Ossetia
- Foreign relations of South Ossetia
- South Ossetian passport
- Visa policy of Georgia
- Visa policy of Russia
- Visa policy of Abkhazia
- Visa policy of Artsakh
- Visa policy of Transnistria
