= List of citizenships refused entry to foreign states =

Some sovereign states refuse entry to all citizens of certain states. These restrictions differ from travel visa requirements, which require travelers to obtain permission to enter a country in advance of their travel. With few exceptions, citizens of the states in this list are prohibited from entering the corresponding listed states. Such prohibitions are often referred to as travel bans, although that term can have other meanings.

== List of travel bans by refused citizenship ==
Citizenship	Refused by	Notes	References
Abkhazia	All except: Russia; Transnistria; South Ossetia; Nicaragua; Venezuela; Syria	See also: Abkhaz–Georgian conflict and Political status of Abkhazia Abkhazia has limited recognition. Abkhazians may also apply for a Russian passport.	
Afghanistan	United States	See also: Restricting the Entry of Foreign Nationals to Protect the United States from Foreign Terrorists and Other National Security and Public Safety Threats	
Armenia	Azerbaijan	See also: Nagorno-Karabakh conflict Due to a state of war with Armenia, the government of Azerbaijan has banned the entry and transit of Armenian nationals, as well as citizens of any other country who are of Armenian descent (including Armenian Russians), to the Republic of Azerbaijan.	
Bangladesh	Sudan		
Chad	United States	See also: Restricting the Entry of Foreign Nationals to Protect the United States from Foreign Terrorists and Other National Security and Public Safety Threats	
Equatorial Guinea	United States	See also: Restricting the Entry of Foreign Nationals to Protect the United States from Foreign Terrorists and Other National Security and Public Safety Threats	
Bangladesh	Libya	See also: Second Libyan Civil War Since April 2017, nationals of these countries are banned from entering eastern Libya, which is under control by the Tobruk government. Other nationals who do not possess a valid visa or residence permit will also be refused entry.	
Iran	Libya	See also: Second Libyan Civil War Since April 2017, nationals of these countries are banned from entering eastern Libya, which is under control by the Tobruk government. Other nationals who do not possess a valid visa or residence permit will also be refused entry.	
Pakistan	Libya	See also: Second Libyan Civil War Since April 2017, nationals of these countries are banned from entering eastern Libya, which is under control by the Tobruk government. Other nationals who do not possess a valid visa or residence permit will also be refused entry.	
Sudan	Libya	See also: Second Libyan Civil War Since April 2017, nationals of these countries are banned from entering eastern Libya, which is under control by the Tobruk government. Other nationals who do not possess a valid visa or residence permit will also be refused entry.	
Syria	Libya	See also: Second Libyan Civil War Since April 2017, nationals of these countries are banned from entering eastern Libya, which is under control by the Tobruk government. Other nationals who do not possess a valid visa or residence permit will also be refused entry.	
Yemen	Libya	See also: Second Libyan Civil War Since April 2017, nationals of these countries are banned from entering eastern Libya, which is under control by the Tobruk government. Other nationals who do not possess a valid visa or residence permit will also be refused entry.	
Belarus	Ascension Island	Starting from May 2015, the Ascension Island Government no longer issues entry visas to nationals of 13 countries. This restriction also applies to e-visas introduced in 2018.	
China	Ascension Island	Starting from May 2015, the Ascension Island Government no longer issues entry visas to nationals of 13 countries. This restriction also applies to e-visas introduced in 2018.	
Egypt	Ascension Island	Starting from May 2015, the Ascension Island Government no longer issues entry visas to nationals of 13 countries. This restriction also applies to e-visas introduced in 2018.	
Hong Kong	Ascension Island	Starting from May 2015, the Ascension Island Government no longer issues entry visas to nationals of 13 countries. This restriction also applies to e-visas introduced in 2018.	
Iran	Ascension Island	Starting from May 2015, the Ascension Island Government no longer issues entry visas to nationals of 13 countries. This restriction also applies to e-visas introduced in 2018.	
Libya	Ascension Island	Starting from May 2015, the Ascension Island Government no longer issues entry visas to nationals of 13 countries. This restriction also applies to e-visas introduced in 2018.	
Macau	Ascension Island	Starting from May 2015, the Ascension Island Government no longer issues entry visas to nationals of 13 countries. This restriction also applies to e-visas introduced in 2018.	
North Korea	Ascension Island	Starting from May 2015, the Ascension Island Government no longer issues entry visas to nationals of 13 countries. This restriction also applies to e-visas introduced in 2018.	
Russia	Ascension Island	Starting from May 2015, the Ascension Island Government no longer issues entry visas to nationals of 13 countries. This restriction also applies to e-visas introduced in 2018.	
Syria	Ascension Island	Starting from May 2015, the Ascension Island Government no longer issues entry visas to nationals of 13 countries. This restriction also applies to e-visas introduced in 2018.	
Taiwan	Ascension Island	Starting from May 2015, the Ascension Island Government no longer issues entry visas to nationals of 13 countries. This restriction also applies to e-visas introduced in 2018.	
Ukraine	Ascension Island	Starting from May 2015, the Ascension Island Government no longer issues entry visas to nationals of 13 countries. This restriction also applies to e-visas introduced in 2018.	
Vietnam	Ascension Island	Starting from May 2015, the Ascension Island Government no longer issues entry visas to nationals of 13 countries. This restriction also applies to e-visas introduced in 2018.	
Eritrea	United States	See also: Restricting the Entry of Foreign Nationals to Protect the United States from Foreign Terrorists and Other National Security and Public Safety Threats	
Ethiopia	Kuwait	Since 2018, domestic workers from Ethiopia have been able to work in Kuwait.	
Haiti	Suriname; United States		
Iran	Libya; Syria; (United Arab Emirates) UAE; United States		
Israel	Afghanistan; Algeria; Bangladesh; Brunei; Iran; Kuwait; Lebanon; Libya; Syria; Yemen	See also: Foreign relations of Israel, International recognition of Israel, and Countries that do not accept Israeli passports Israeli nationals, including Israeli Arabs, are refused entry into these countries. These countries do not recognize the State of Israel; therefore Israeli passport holders are denied entry, yet some countries that do not recognize the State of Israel do not deny entry of Israeli citizens (e.g. Indonesia or Somalia). Citizens of foreign countries with passports containing Israeli stamps or Egyptian/Jordanian stamps issued at border crossings with Israel are also refused entry into certain countries.	
Israel	Iraq	Except Iraqi Kurdistan.	
Israel	Maldives	Temporary measure put in place since 15 April 2025 by the Maldivian government, in response to the Gaza war.	
Israel	Malaysia	Unless a clearance permit is obtained from the Ministry of Home Affairs.	
Israel	Oman	Except for transit.	
Israel	Pakistan	Unless a visa and police registration are obtained.	
Israel	Saudi Arabia	Except for religious and business purposes.	
Kosovo	Serbia	Serbia does not recognize the 2008 Kosovo declaration of independence and Kosovan passports are invalid for entry to Serbia; however, Kosovo identity cards are allowed to enter and exit both Serbia and Kosovo.	
Kosovo	Azerbaijan; Belarus; Cuba; (Georgia (country)) Georgia; Hong Kong; Kazakhstan; Kyrgyzstan; Moldova; Russia; Seychelles; Tajikistan; Turkmenistan; Uzbekistan; Venezuela	See also: Political status of Kosovo These countries and territories do not recognise the independence of Kosovo and therefore, Kosovo passports are not recognized as legitimate and legal passports. Although not recognizing their independence, some countries, such as Ukraine, allow entry for the holders of Kosovo ordinary passports.	
Libya	United States	See also: Restricting the Entry of Foreign Nationals to Protect the United States from Foreign Terrorists and Other National Security and Public Safety Threats	
Myanmar	United States	See also: Restricting the Entry of Foreign Nationals to Protect the United States from Foreign Terrorists and Other National Security and Public Safety Threats	
Northern Cyprus	All except: Turkey	See also: Political status of Northern Cyprus and Cyprus problem Northern Cyprus is only recognized as a sovereign state by Turkey. Northern Cypriots may also apply for a Turkish passport and a Cypriot passport.	
North Korea	Japan	See also: Japan–North Korea relations and Korean conflict Japan has banned North Korean citizens from entering as part of sanctions against North Korea imposed by the Government of Japan, since February 2016.	Sanctions against North Korea
Republic of the Congo	USA	See also: Restricting the Entry of Foreign Nationals to Protect the United States from Foreign Terrorists and Other National Security and Public Safety Threats	
Russia	Belgium; Czech Republic; Denmark; Estonia; Finland; Iceland; Latvia; Lithuania; Luxembourg; Netherlands; Norway; Poland; Slovakia	As a result of the Russian invasion of Ukraine. Russian citizens are refused entry into specific countries for tourism, culture, business, sports, etc., unless they hold a residence permit issued by the countries listed above. However, they can transit through legally by obtaining a Schengen Visa from countries such as France, Germany or Spain, provided they hold tickets to their destination in the country that issued the visa.	
Somalia	Pakistan	Under the New Visa Policy initiated by ex-Prime Minister Imran Khan, Somalia remains in the B-list. Somali citizens coming from abroad will no longer qualify for visas from embassies of Pakistan. Somali students and families living in Pakistan must possess a recommendation letter and visa extended permission from the government of Pakistan. Police registration is required within 7 days of getting a visa from the government.	
Somalia	Australia; Canada; Czech Republic; Germany; Greece; Hungary; Iceland; New Zealand; Spain; United States	In addition, ordinary passports issued by Somalia are not recognized in Belgium, Netherlands, Luxembourg (Benelux countries), Denmark, Finland, Liechtenstein, Sweden and Switzerland. These countries only recognise Somali diplomatic passports issued after 2014, according to the EU's Public Register Of Authentic Travel And Identity Documents Online (PRADO).	
Somaliland	All except: Israel; Taiwan	See also: Foreign relations of Somaliland Somaliland is not internationally recognized. Somalilanders may apply for a Somali passport.	
South Ossetia	All except: Russia; Abkhazia; Transnistria; Sahrawi Arab Democratic Republic; Nicaragua; Venezuela; Syria	See also: Russo-Georgian War and Political status of South Ossetia South Ossetia has limited recognition. South Ossetians may also apply for a Russian passport.	
Sudan	United States	See also: Restricting the Entry of Foreign Nationals to Protect the United States from Foreign Terrorists and Other National Security and Public Safety Threats	
Syria	Egypt; Libya; Mali		
Taiwan	(Georgia (country)) Georgia; Moldova	See also: Political status of Taiwan and One China Additionally, some countries do not recognize Taiwanese passports, which makes it difficult for Taiwanese passport holders to obtain visas from those countries, despite Timatic suggesting that Taiwanese citizens can enter. Venezuela and Cuba are one of the noticeable examples in 2024.	
Transnistria	All except: Abkhazia; South Ossetia	See also: 2006 Transnistrian customs crisis and Transnistria conflict Transnistria has limited diplomatic recognition. Transnistrians may also apply for Russian, Ukrainian, Moldovan and Romanian passports.	
Ukraine	Mali; Transnistria		
United States	Burkina Faso; Chad; Mali; Niger	In response to restrictions on Burkinabé, Chadian, Malian, and Nigerien citizens from traveling to the United States by the Trump administration.	
Yemen	United States	See also: Restricting the Entry of Foreign Nationals to Protect the United States from Foreign Terrorists and Other National Security and Public Safety Threats	

== See also ==
- Executive Order 13769 (United States)
- Executive Order 13780 (United States)
- Travel ban
