= Visa policy of Abkhazia =

Policy on permits required to enter Abkhazia

Abkhazian visa

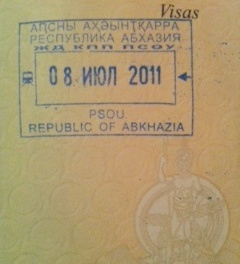
Passport stamp of Abkhazia

Visitors to the Republic of Abkhazia must obtain an entry permit unless they are citizens of one of the visa-exempt countries. All visitors must have a passport valid for at least 6 months upon arrival.

== Overview ==
If Georgian border guards find an Abkhazian visa, Abkhazian stamps or a Russian checkpoint stamp on the border with Abkhazia in a passport while entering Georgia (by land, air or sea), one is very likely to be fined and often not allowed to enter the country additionally. Sometimes, in addition to a fine, foreigners who have the above mentioned stamps in their passports or stamps from the checkpoint at the Russian-Abkhazian border are prosecuted for illegal border crossing under the laws of Georgia, as Georgia considers Abkhazia its territory and requires visitors to comply with visa policy of Georgia.

Citizens of third countries (all except Georgian citizens) can cross the border from Georgia into Abkhazia and vice versa, as there is border control in the Zugdidi area ("Ingur" checkpoint). Nevertheless, the departure from Georgia to Abkhazia is de facto free, since Georgia considers Abkhazia to be its part, however, it will be necessary to return from Abkhazia only through Georgia, otherwise the Georgian side will consider that you left the country illegally.

Although Abkhazia has seaports, it has no sea passenger services to the outside world (not even to Russia). However, the railway network has been restored. Abkhazian Railways and Russian Railways operate services from Sukhumi to Sochi. Seasonal summer services also sometimes connect Moscow to Sukhumi. On May 1, 2025, Russian airline UVT Aero resumed regular direct flights between Moscow and Sukhumi, marking the first such service since 1993. Georgian authorities have not controlled the territory of Abkhazia since 1992, when the war between the two sides broke out.

== Visa policy map ==
Visa policy of Abkhazia Abkhazia Visa not required (90 days) Visa not required (14 days) Entry permit required

== Visa exemption ==
According to the Ministry of Foreign Affairs of Abkhazia, citizens of the following countries (including citizens belonging to the members of the Community for Democracy and Rights of Nations) may enter Abkhazia without a visa for the following period:

90 days

- Nicaragua^{ID}
- Russia^{IP}
- South Ossetia^{IP}
- Transnistria^{IP}
- Tuvalu^{ID}

14 days

- Belarus
- Kazakhstan

_{ID – May enter with an ID card in lieu of a passport for up to 90 days, Passport for International travel required beyond 90 days.}
_{IP – May enter with an internal passport in lieu of a passport for up to 90 days, Passport for International travel required beyond 90 days.}

In addition, children aged 14 and below may enter Abkhazia without a visa, regardless of nationality.

=== Tour groups ===
As part of organized tour groups from travel companies registered in Abkhazia or in Russia, tourists from all countries (except Georgia) can visit Abkhazia without an Abkhazian visa by land officially through Russia and it's also possible to enter through Georgia with a free electronic authorization, for a period of no more than 24 hours.

=== Entry permit ===
Citizens of other countries need to obtain an entry permit. Below are the requirements for receiving an entry permit to the Republic of Abkhazia:

1. Copy of passport (sent by e-mail or by fax), valid for at least 6 months after planned entry to Abkhazia.
2. Completed application.

== Visitors statistics ==
The Republic of Abkhazia is one of the most visited partially recognized countries by tourists in the world.

The majority of foreigners visiting Abkhazia are from the Post-Soviet space. They visit Abkhazia as it is an affordable destination for beach and mountain tourism. The country also has developed tourism in caves and gorges, for urban exploration in abandoned and destroyed objects.

Citizens of the Russian Federation

| Country | 2021 | 2020 | 2019 | 2018 | 2017 | 2016 | 2015 | 2014 | 2013 | 2012 | 2011 | 2010 | 2009 | 2008 |
|---|---|---|---|---|---|---|---|---|---|---|---|---|---|---|
| Russia | ▲5,177,816 | ▼2,824,631 | ▲4,902,475 | ▲4,520,750 | ▲4,357,973 | ▲4,274,549 | ▲3,833,802 | ▼3,285,377 | ▼3,359,453 | ▲3,367,243 | ▲3,072,517 | ▲2,804,505 | ▲2,503,898 | 1,930,302 |

== See also ==
- Visa requirements for Abkhaz citizens
- Visa policy of Georgia
- Visa policy of Artsakh
- Visa policy of Russia
- Visa policy of South Ossetia
- Visa policy of Transnistria
