= Visa policy of Libya =

Policy on permits required to enter Libya

Visitors to Libya must obtain a visa from one of the Libyan diplomatic missions or an e-Visa unless they are citizens from one of the visa-exempt countries.

== Visa policy map ==
Visa policy of Libya Libya Visa not required (3 months) Visa not required (30 days) Visa not required (3 months; conditional); otherwise, eVisa required (30 days; only through a sponsor) Visa on arrival (30 days) / eVisa (30 days; only through a sponsor) eVisa (30 days; only through a sponsor) Visa required Admission restricted Admission refused

== Visa exemption ==
Citizens of the following countries as well as refugees and stateless persons residing in these countries may enter Libya without a visa for the following period:

3 months

- Algeria
- Mauritania
- Tunisia

30 days

- Malaysia

Citizens of Algeria, Malaysia and Mauritania may only land at Misurata and Tripoli Mitiga without a visa.

Citizens of Malaysia and Mauritania might require a security letter issued by the Libyan Immigration Authorities.

Citizens of Belarus may only land at Benghazi without a visa. The reciprocal visa exemption might no longer be in force, as Belarus has imposed a visa requirement on Libyan nationals. Additionally, the exemption is not listed in IATA Timatic.

Date of visa changes

Introduced:

- 26 May 2025: Belarus
- 8 June 2026: Malaysia
- 30 August 2026: Mauritania (restored)

Cancelled:

- 27 October 2011: Morocco
- 16 November 2011: Egypt
- January 2013: Syria
- 24 September 2015: Turkey
- Unknown: Benin, Chad, Sudan

=== Conditional visa free access ===
In addition, citizens of the following countries in certain age groups and genders may also enter Libya without a visa, for 3 months:

- Egypt^{1}
- Turkey^{2}

_{1 - Visa exemption for male nationals aged under 18 or older than 45 and all females.}
_{2 - Visa exemption for all nationals aged under 16 or older than 55.}

=== Non-ordinary passports ===
Holders of diplomatic, official, service or special passports of the following countries may enter Libya without a visa:

- Azerbaijan^{2} ^{X}
- Belarus^{1}
- Benin^{1}
- Chad^{2} ^{D}
- Comoros^{4}
- Djibouti^{6} ^{D}
- Egypt^{2}
- Eritrea^{3} ^{D}
- Italy^{2}
- Malaysia^{5}
- Malta^{2}
- Mali^{5} ^{D}
- Mauritania^{1}
- Morocco^{2}
- Slovenia^{2}
- Somalia^{2}
- Sudan^{5}
- Tunisia^{1}
- Turkey^{2}
- Venezuela^{2}

_{D - Diplomatic passports only.}
_{X - Temporarily suspended.}
_{1 - 3 months.}
_{2 - 90 days.}
_{3 - 60 days.}
_{4 - 45 days.}
_{5 - 30 days.}
_{6 - 14 days.}

== Visa on arrival ==
Jordan — Jordanian citizens may obtain a visa on arrival at designated Libyan border crossings and airports, although the process is only applied on Mitiga International Airport or Misrata International Airport. Jordanian citizens may also obtain a Libyan entry visa electronically through the relevant Libyan authorities.

Citizens of Jordan might require a security letter issued by the Libyan Immigration Authorities.

== Electronic visa (e-Visa) ==
Libya launched an e-Visa system on 21 March 2024. Tourist e-Visa is valid for 90 days and good for single entry, it allows applicants from most countries to stay no more than 30 days by paying a 63 USD fee.

== Tourist police and sponsor ==
Citizens of all countries require a tour operator or a local sponsor to visit Libya. An e-Visa will not be granted otherwise.

A tourist police escort is also required when traveling as a tourist with a tour operator. Different requirements exist, such as health insurance or specific authorization from the government; however, they are usually handled by the tour operator.

In the case of visiting Libya via a local sponsor, a security letter issued by the Libyan Immigration Authorities is also required.

Independent travel in Libya for tourist purposes is generally not allowed.

Currently, only citizens from Tunisia are fully exempt from these requirements. Citizens of Algeria are exempt only when landing at Mitiga and Misurata. Citizens of Egypt and Turkey have specific age restrictions listed above.

== Compulsory currency exchange ==
Visitors travelling to Libya for touristic purposes must have 1000 Libyan Dinars or more upon arrival in Libya, ensuring financial sufficiency for the time of the visit. Failure to do so will result in the traveler being refused entry.

Exempt are those visiting a resident, provided holding proof of sponsorship covering entire stay and those traveling as part of a paid tourist package if holding a valid visa.

== Admission restrictions ==
=== Border closures ===
Libyan borders with Chad, Niger, Sudan and Algeria are closed. In reality, these borders are not controlled by the Government but by the Tuareg people and Toubou people.

=== Restricted visa ===
Citizens of the following countries are restricted to get the visa to enter Libya:

- Bangladesh
- Iran
- Pakistan
- Sudan
- Syria
- Yemen

=== Qatar ===
Citizens of Qatar are only allowed to enter or transit Libya through designated airports in Tripoli International Airport, Mitiga International Airport, Misrata Airport, Benina International Airport and Sabha Airport. Entry or transit through other ports of entry is refused to Qatari citizens.

=== Israel ===
Entry and transit is banned to citizens of Israel, even if not leaving the aircraft and proceeding by the same flight. Visitors (regardless of nationality) will also be refused entry and transit if holding travel documents containing an Israeli visa, or any evidence of having entered Israel.

=== Travel restrictions ===
As of 2013, governments of the United States, New Zealand, Australia, Canada, Ireland, the United Kingdom, Spain, France, Hungary, Latvia, Lithuania, Germany, Austria, Bulgaria, Norway, Croatia, Romania, Slovenia, Czech Republic, Russia, Denmark, Slovakia, Estonia, Italy, Poland, Iran and South Korea (as travel banned) advise their citizens against all (or in some cases all but essential) travel to Libya.

== See also ==
- Visa requirements for Libyan citizens
