= Tourism in Georgia =

Tourism in Georgia may refer to:

- Tourism in Georgia (country)
- Tourism in Georgia (U.S. state)
