= Georgian passport =

Passport issued to Georgian nationals

Georgian passport; საქართველოს პასპორტი
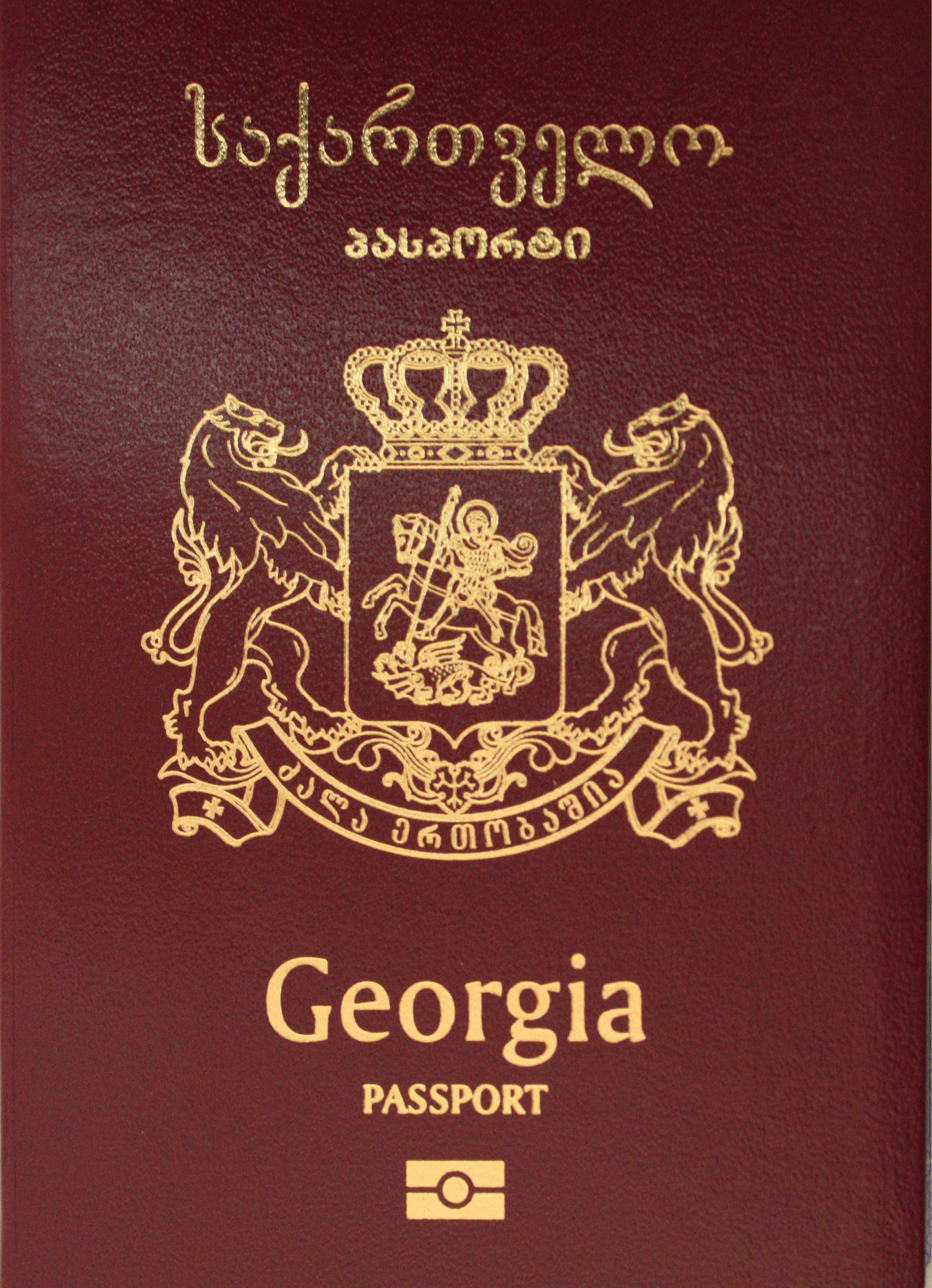
- The front cover of a pre-2025 Georgian biometric passport.
- Type: Passport
- Issued by: Georgia — Ministry of Justice
- Purpose: Identification
- Eligibility: Georgian citizenship
- Expiration: Adult (18 or older): 10 years Child (Under 18): 3 years
- Cost: Adult: GEL 150; Child: GEL 75 (See More)

The Georgian passport (Georgian: საქართველოს პასპორტი, romanized: sakartvelos p'asp'ort'i) is issued to Georgian citizens to facilitate international travel.

The first Georgian passports were issued by the government of the Democratic Republic of Georgia from 1918 to 1921.

== Visa requirements ==
Countries and territories with visa-free entries or visas on arrival for holders of regular Georgian passports

As of January 03, 2024, Georgian citizens had visa-free or visa on arrival access to 133 countries and territories, ranking the Georgian passport 34th in terms of travel freedom according to the Henley Passport Index.

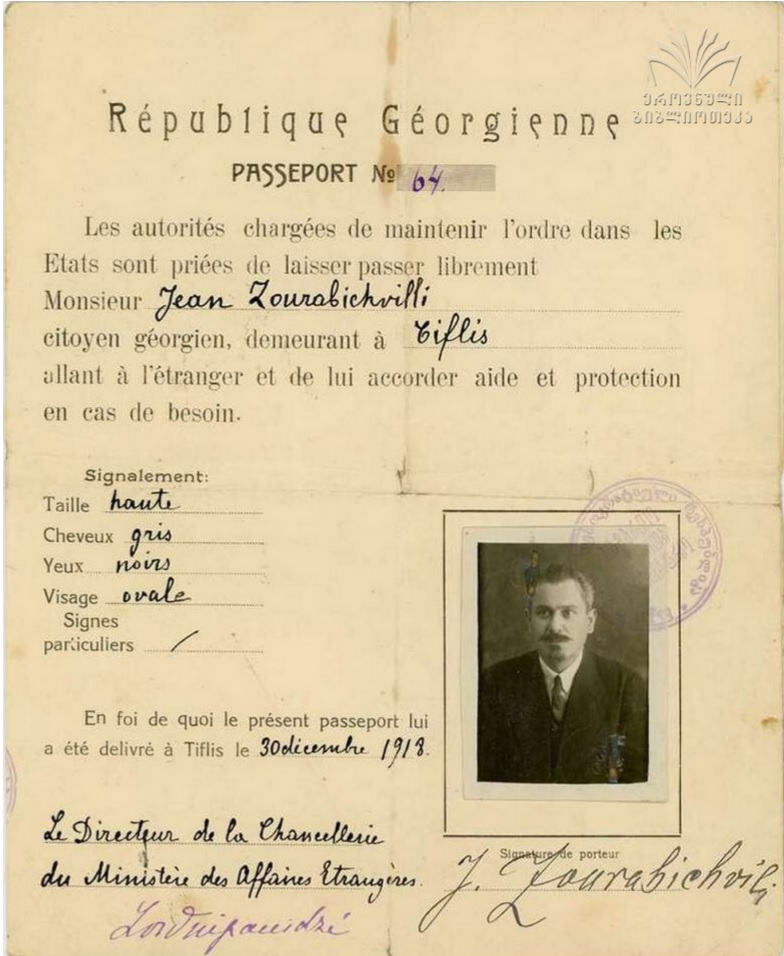
Passport of a citizen of the Democratic Republic of Georgia, 1918

== Gallery ==
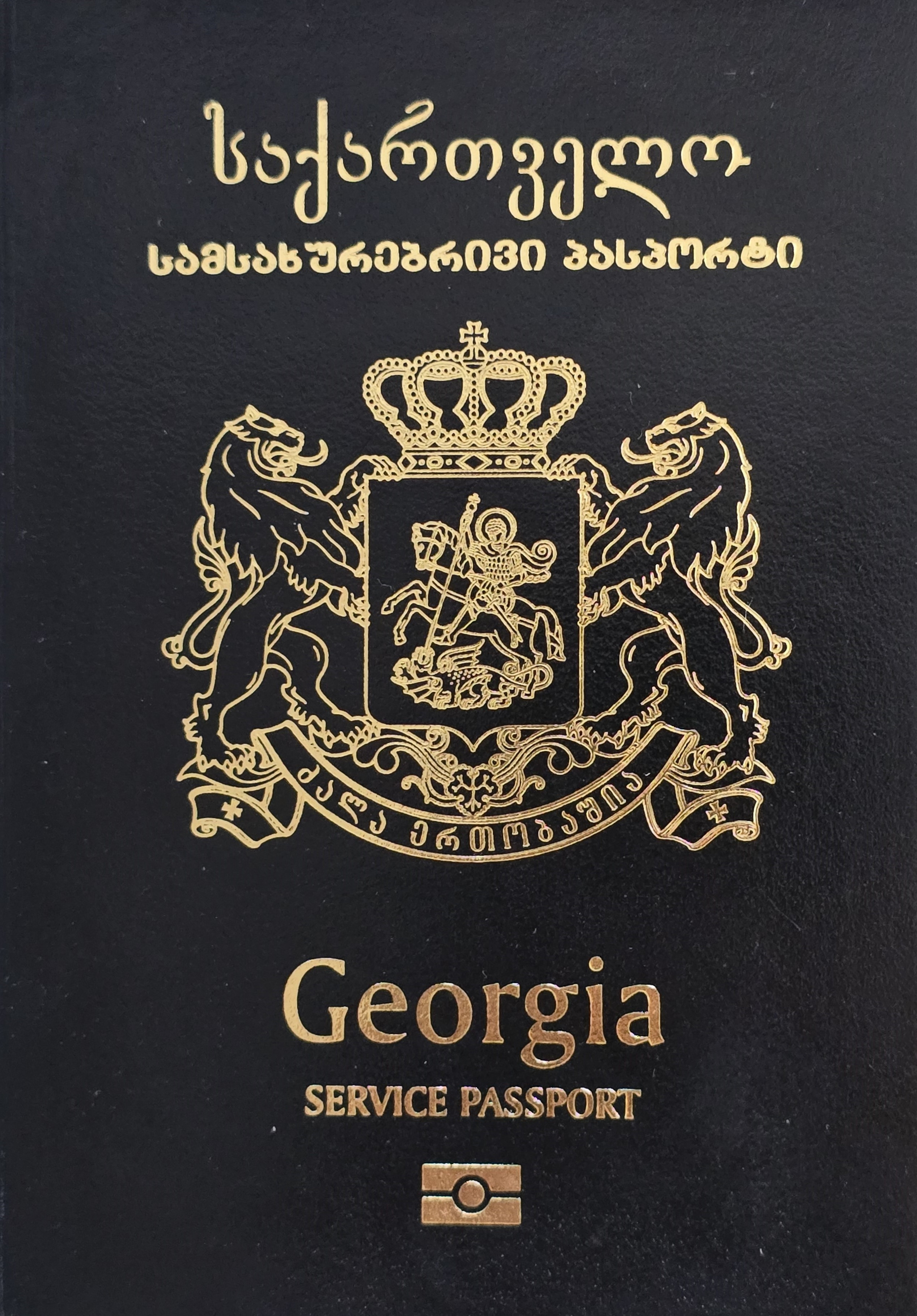
Georgian service passport

== See also ==
- Visa requirements for Georgian citizens
- Visa policy of Georgia
- List of passports
- E.U. Eastern Partnership Program Eastern Partnership
- Georgia passport index Georgia Passport Ranking 2026: Visa Free Countries, Benefits and Citizenship Options — Immigrant Invest
