= Tourism in Georgia (country) =

Georgian National Tourism Administration logo

Tourism in Georgia is an increasingly important component of the country's economy. In 2015 it employed around 158,500 people, producing 6.7 percent of Georgia's GDP and providing US$1.94 billion of revenue. In 2019, the number of international arrivals reached a record high of 9.3 million people with foreign exchange income in the year's first three quarters amounting to over US$3 billion. The country plans to host 11 million visitors by 2025 with annual revenues reaching US$6.6 billion.

The expenditures of foreign visitors to Georgia have a significant effect on the balance of payments, and approximately 35.9 percent of Georgia’s goods and service export revenue comes from tourism. International tourists stay an average of 6.5 days.

The official body tasked with promoting tourism to Georgia is the Georgian National Tourism Administration (GNTA). In 2016, the GNTA participated in 21 international and domestic tourism fairs, conducted marketing campaigns on 16 target markets, and hosted 99 press and familiarization trips.

== Accommodation ==
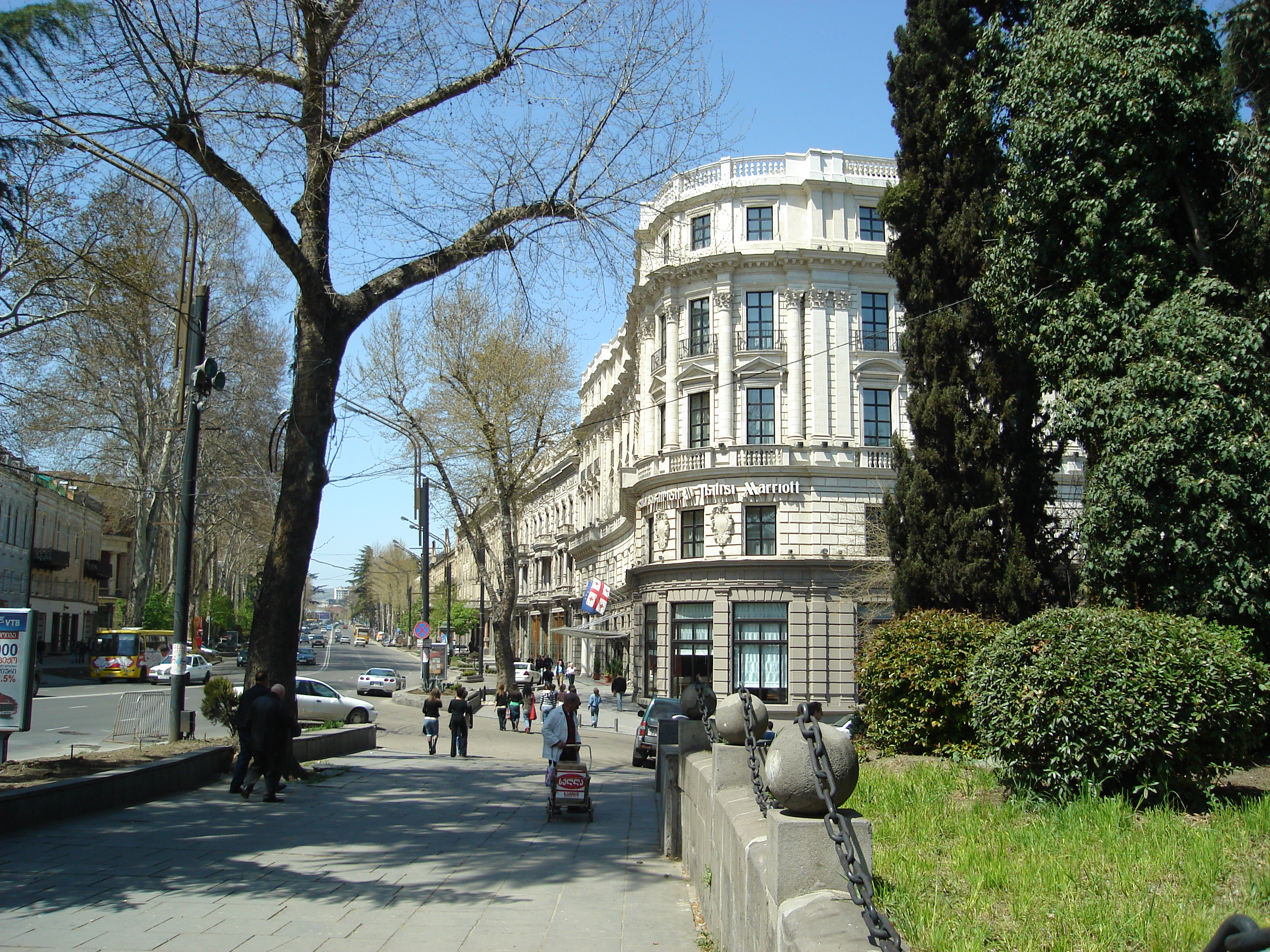
Hotel Tbilisi Marriott

As of August 2017, there were a total of 1,945 accommodation units registered in the GNTA database, with a total of 65,656 beds. The regions with the most beds were Tbilisi - 17,796 (27.1 percent) and Adjara - 12,126 (18.5 percent). The most prevalent form of accommodation is hotels (41,123 beds), followed by Family Hotels (11,374 beds). In 2017, 60 new hotels with a combined bed number of 3,894 were opened. From 2017 to 2019, 194 hotels are planned to open, with a total bed number of 21,216.

Hotel chains with operations in Georgia include:Marriott Hotels & Resorts,Le Méridien, Courtyard by Marriott, Mercure, Millennium Hotel, Hilton Hotels & Resorts, Holiday Inn, Sheraton Hotels and Resorts, and Radisson Hotels.

Batumi features several casinos that attract tourists from Turkey, where casino gambling is illegal.

== Statistics ==
Tourist arrivals of 2018 in %

Yearly tourist arrivals in millions

=== Arrivals by country ===
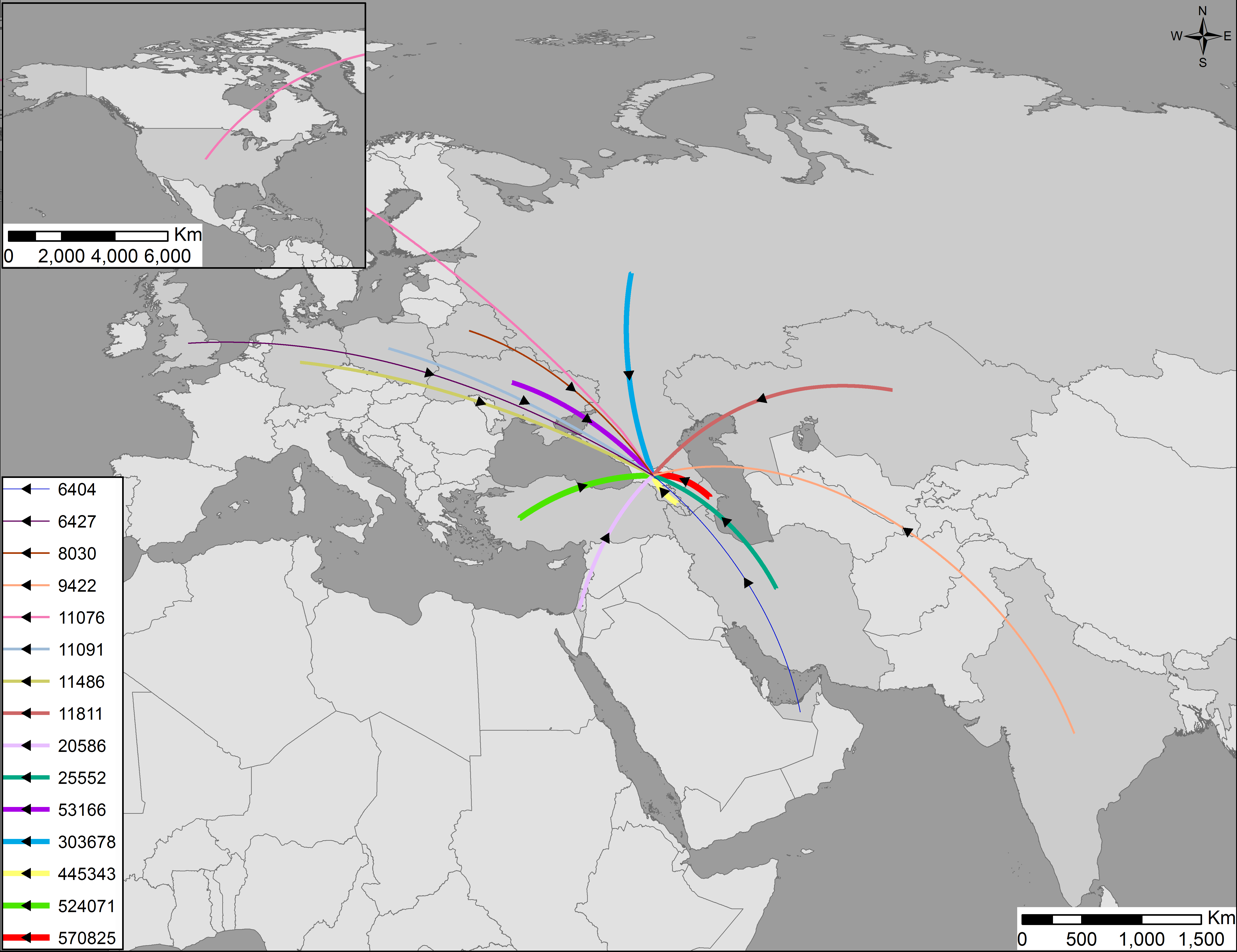
Top 15 countries of origin for international tourists (first 5 months, 2016)

The most common citizenships of international visitors arriving in each year, 2014-2025:

Arrivals in Georgia (2022–2025)
| Rank | Country | 2025 | 2024 | 2023 | 2022 |
|---|---|---|---|---|---|
| 1 | Russia | ▲1,579,764 | ▲1,421,923 | ▲1,110,762 | ▲868,229 |
| 2 | Turkey | ▼1,248,881 | ▲1,336,834 | ▲770,811 | ▲540,135 |
| 3 | Armenia | ▼948,242 | ▲948,299 | ▲515,668 | ▲383,226 |
| 4 | Israel | ▲402,426 | ▲310,982 | ▲211,548 | ▲205,874 |
| 5 | Azerbaijan | ▲292,149 | ▲219,356 | ▲173,922 | ▲135,429 |
| 6 | Kazakhstan | ▼169,367 | ▲178,930 | ▲159,008 | ▲115,022 |
| 8 | Belarus | ▲150,325 | ▲140,536 | ▼124,333 | ▲125,615 |
| 9 | India | ▲142,476 | ▲124,335 | ▲83,930 | ▲52,688 |
| 10 | Ukraine | ▲136,826 | ▼118,528 | ▼132,127 | ▲156,919 |
| 11 | China | ▲127,895 | ▲88,583 | ▲46,875 | ▲7,255 |
| 7 | Iran | ▼120,068 | ▲145,670 | ▲123,737 | ▲100,910 |
| 12 | Saudi Arabia | ▲96,340 | ▲88,298 | ▼70,676 | ▲117,480 |
| 13 | Germany | ▲83,656 | ▲78,644 | ▲64,468 | ▲45,635 |
| 14 | Poland | ▲79,722 | ▼66,504 | ▲88,405 | ▲41,150 |
| 15 | Uzbekistan | ▲72,913 | ▲64,259 | ▲49,432 | ▲46,004 |
| Total number of tourists | | 7,803,239 | 7,368,149 | 6,171,540 | 4,703,945 |

2014-2017

| № | Country | 2014 | № | Country | 2015 | № | Country | 2016 | № | Country | 2017 |
|---|---|---|---|---|---|---|---|---|---|---|---|
| 1 | Turkey | 1,442,695 | 1 | Armenia | ▲1,468,888 | 1 | Azerbaijan | ▲1,523,075 | 1 | Azerbaijan | ▼1,301,556 |
| 2 | Armenia | 1,325,635 | 2 | Azerbaijan | ▲1,393,257 | 2 | Armenia | ▲1,496,246 | 2 | Armenia | ▼1,287,168 |
| 3 | Azerbaijan | 1,283,214 | 3 | Turkey | ▼1,391,721 | 3 | Turkey | ▼1,254,089 | 3 | Russia | ▲1,135,610 |
| 4 | Russia | 811,621 | 4 | Russia | ▲926,144 | 4 | Russia | ▲1,037,564 | 4 | Turkey | ▼1,007,276 |
| 5 | Ukraine | 143,521 | 5 | Ukraine | ▼141,734 | 5 | Ukraine | ▲172,631 | 5 | Iran | ▲282,549 |
| 6 | Iran | 47,929 | 6 | Israel | ▲59,487 | 6 | Iran | ▲147,915 | 6 | Ukraine | ▼169,862 |
| 7 | Poland | 46,314 | 7 | Poland | ▼41,425 | 7 | Israel | ▲92,213 | 7 | Israel | ▲115,040 |
| 8 | Israel | 42,385 | 8 | Germany | ▲36,826 | 8 | Kazakhstan | ▲48,809 | 8 | Poland | ▲48,913 |
| 9 | Germany | 33,446 | 9 | Kazakhstan | ▲36,777 | 9 | Poland | ▲44,388 | 9 | Kazakhstan | ▲56,765 |
| 10 | Kazakhstan | 28,394 | 10 | United States | ▲31,147 | 10 | Germany | ▲40,889 | 10 | Saudi Arabia | ▲56,247 |
| Total number of tourists in 2014 | | 5,515,559 | Total number of tourists in 2015 | | 5,255,999 | Total number of tourists in 2016 | | 5,392,816 | Total number of tourists in 2017 | | 6,482,830 |

2018-2021

| № | Country | 2018 | № | Country | 2019 | № | Country | 2020 | № | Country | 2021 |
|---|---|---|---|---|---|---|---|---|---|---|---|
| 1 | Azerbaijan | ▲1,424,610 | 1 | Azerbaijan | ▲1,526,619 | 1 | Turkey | ▼335,580 | 1 | Turkey | ▼326,494 |
| 2 | Russia | ▲1,404,757 | 2 | Russia | ▲1,471,558 | 2 | Azerbaijan | ▲295,132 | 2 | Russia | ▲212,979 |
| 3 | Armenia | ▼1,268,886 | 3 | Armenia | ▲1,365,048 | 3 | Armenia | ▼260,965 | 3 | Armenia | ▼164,698 |
| 4 | Turkey | ▲1,098,555 | 4 | Turkey | ▲1,156,513 | 4 | Russia | ▼208,677 | 4 | Ukraine | ▲144,901 |
| 5 | Iran | ▲291,070 | 5 | Ukraine | ▲207,667 | 5 | Ukraine | ▼42,414 | 5 | Israel | ▲100,686 |
| 6 | Ukraine | ▲177,058 | 6 | Israel | ▲205,051 | 6 | Israel | ▼25,731 | 6 | Azerbaijan | ▼82,718 |
| 7 | Israel | ▲156,922 | 7 | Iran | ▼141,997 | 7 | Uzbekistan | 14,410 | 7 | Kazakhstan | ▲66,787 |
| 8 | Poland | ▲66,903 | 8 | Kazakhstan | ▲103,611 | 8 | Belarus | 14,340 | 8 | Saudi Arabia | ▲63,437 |
| 9 | Germany | ▲64,486 | 9 | Germany | ▲89,051 | 9 | Kazakhstan | ▼13,779 | 9 | Belarus | ▲53,698 |
| 10 | Belarus | ▲58,955 | 10 | Poland | ▲88,300 | 10 | Saudi Arabia | 4,960 | 10 | Uzbekistan | ▲36,384 |
| Total number of tourists in 2018 | | 7,203,350 | Total number of tourists in 2019 | | 7,725,774 | Total number of tourists in 2020 | | 1,513,421 | Total number of tourists in 2021 | | 1,721,242 |

== Destinations and attractions ==
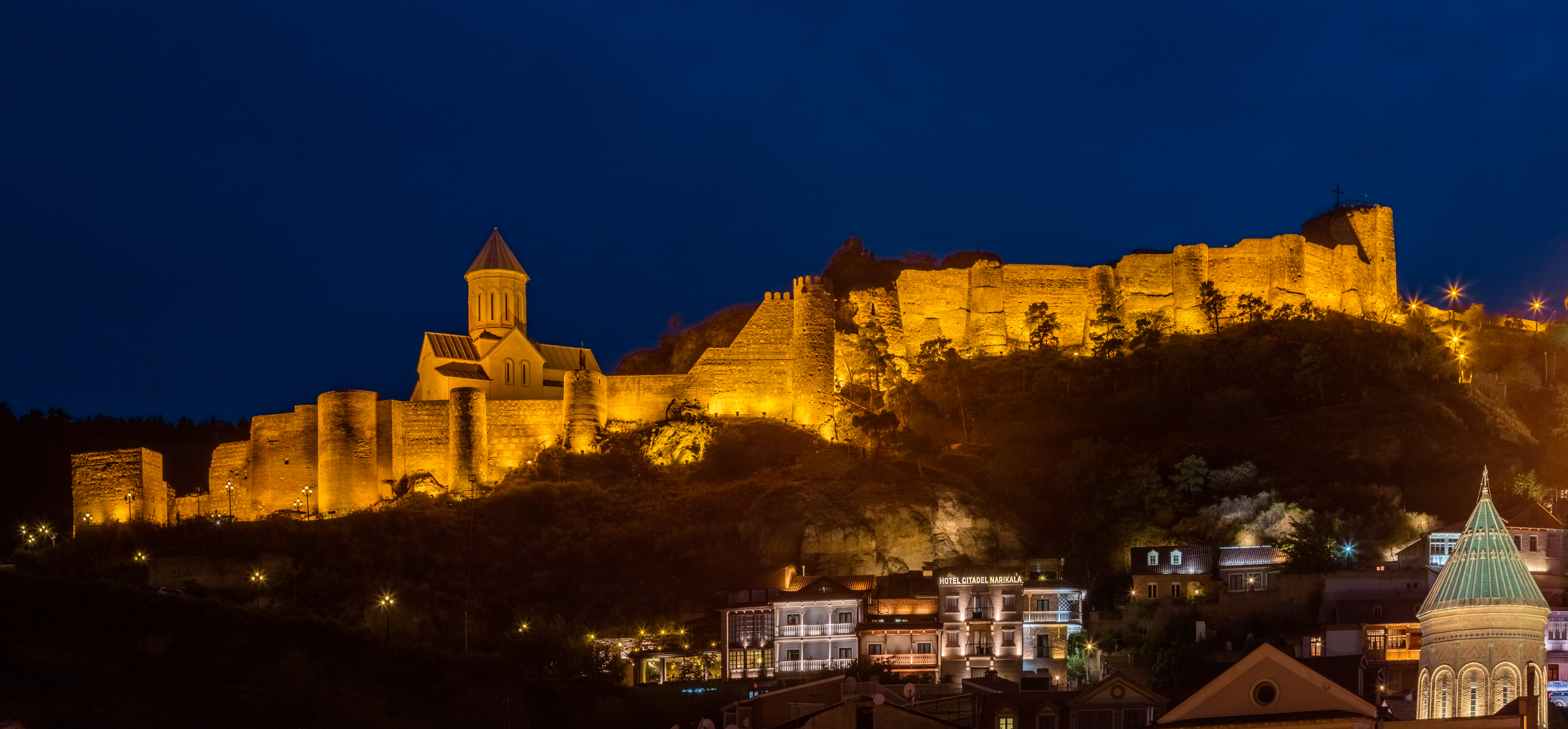
Narikala Fortress in Tbilisi

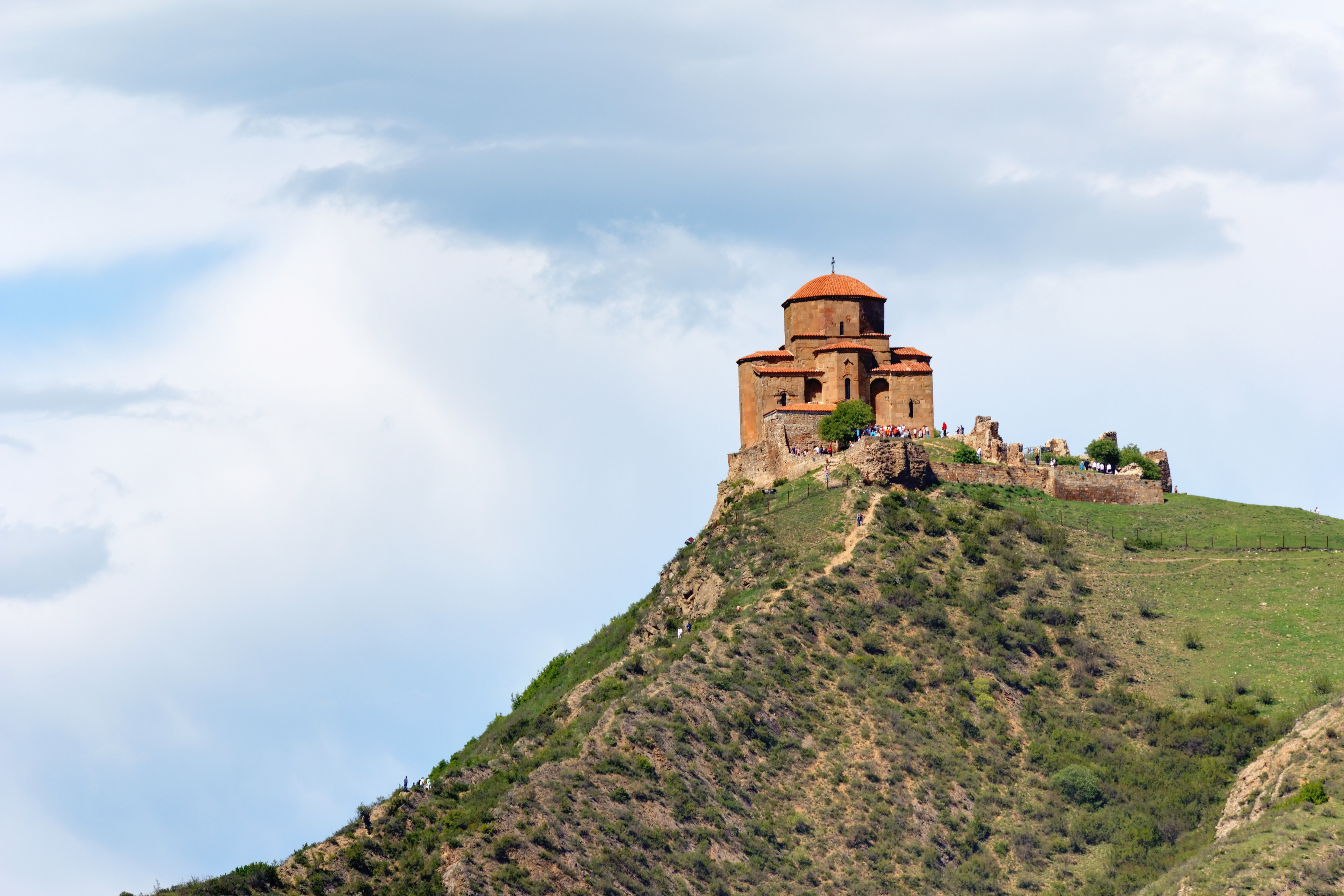
Jvari Monastery in Mtskheta

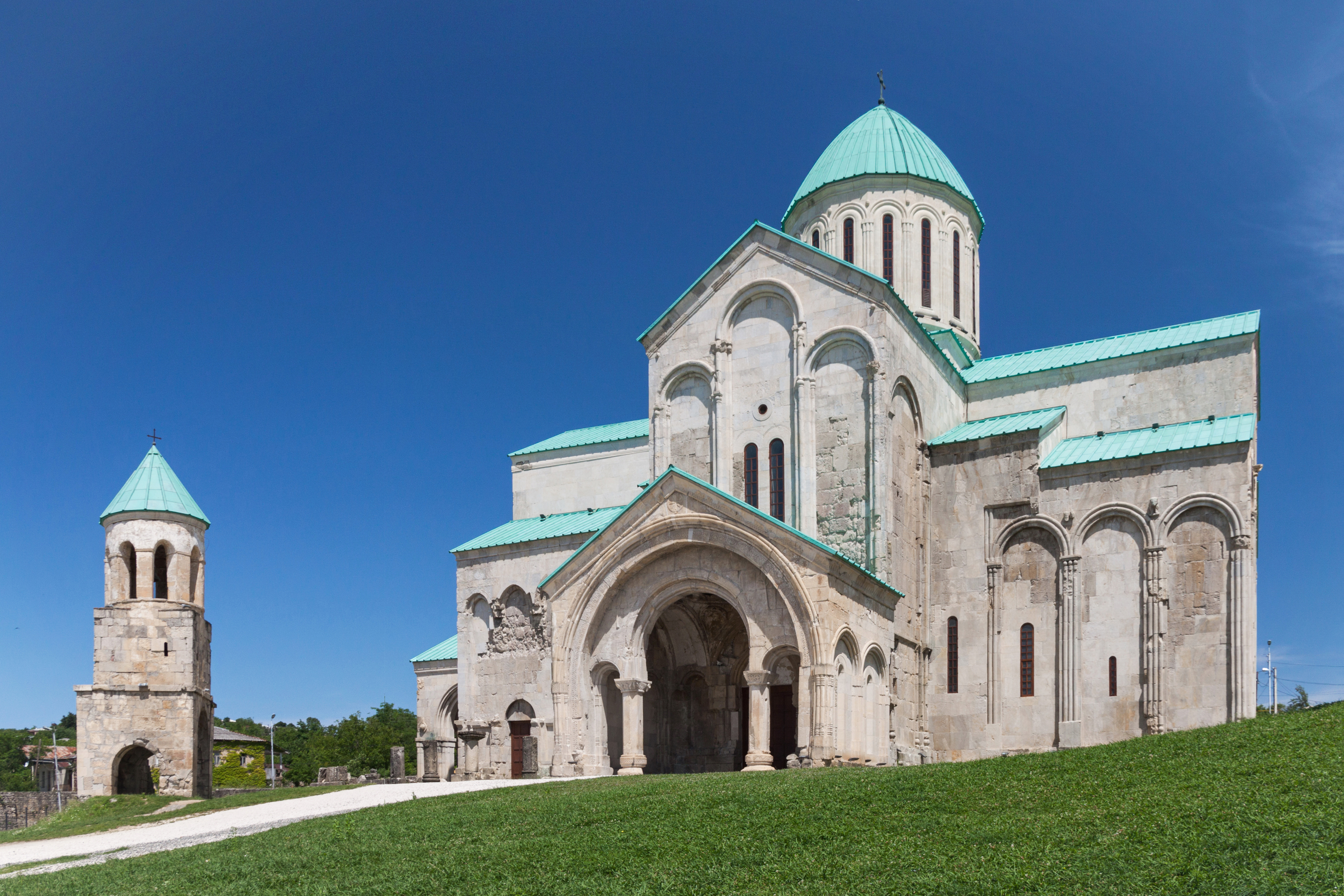
Bagrati Cathedral in Kutaisi

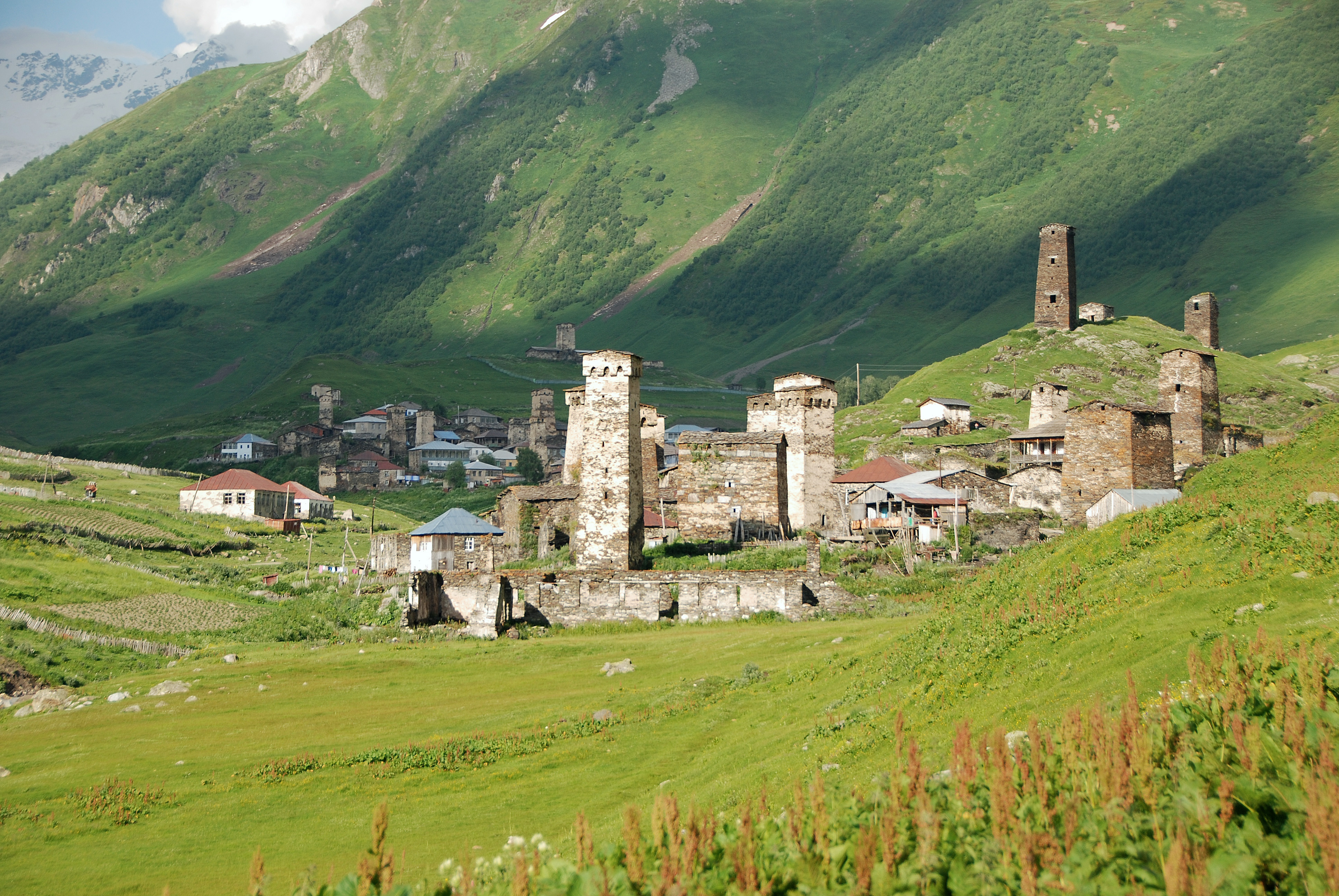
Ushguli community in Svaneti

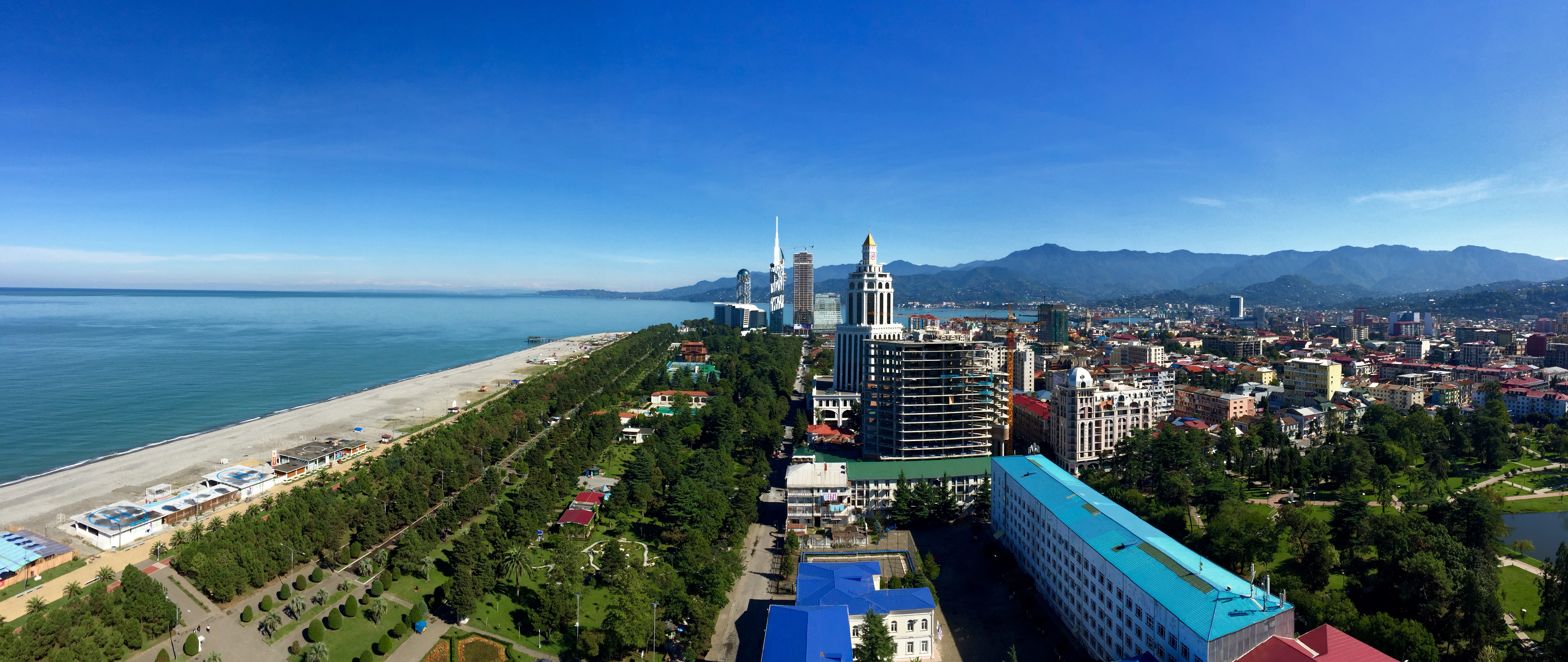
Batumi seaside

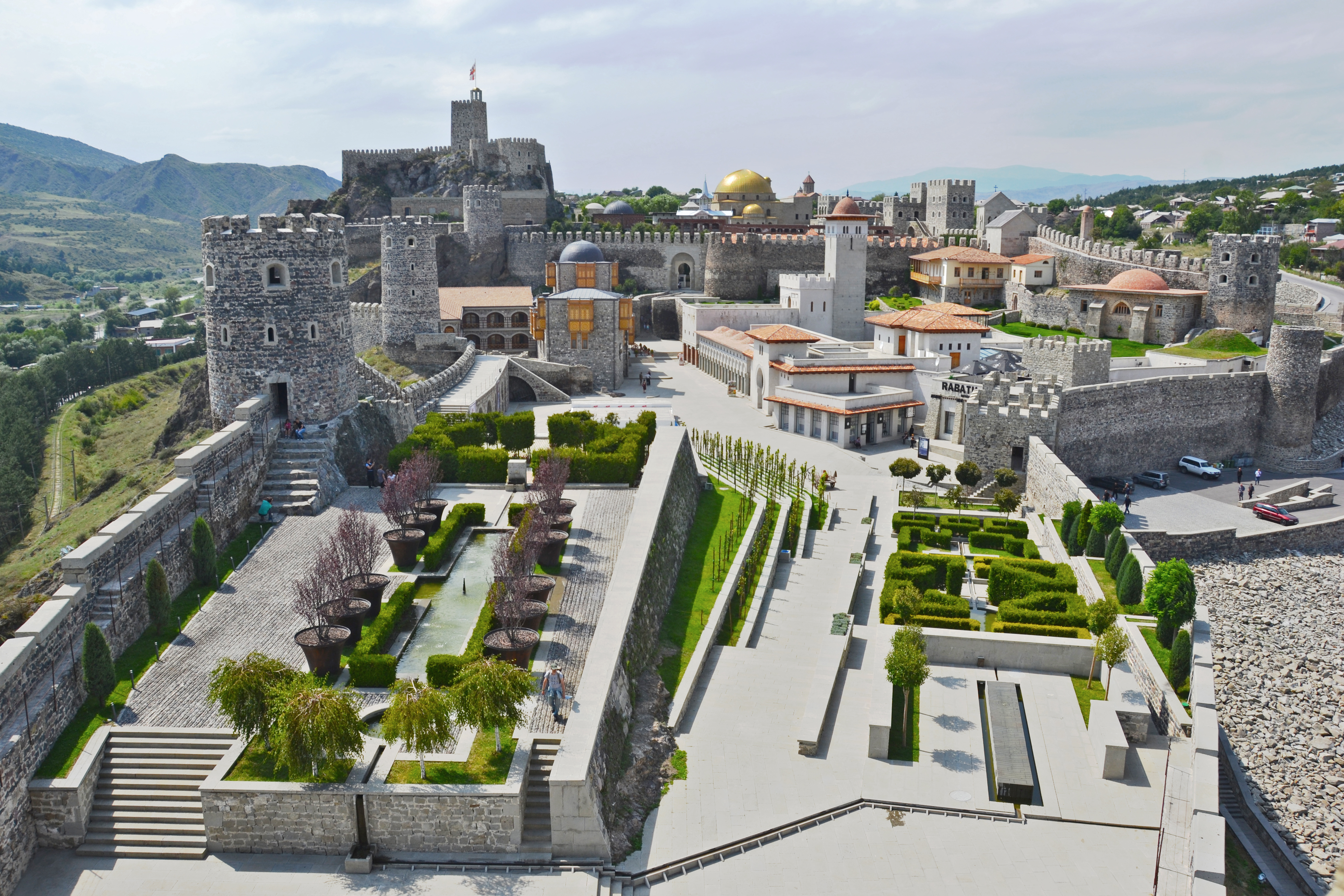
Rabati Castle in Akhaltsikhe

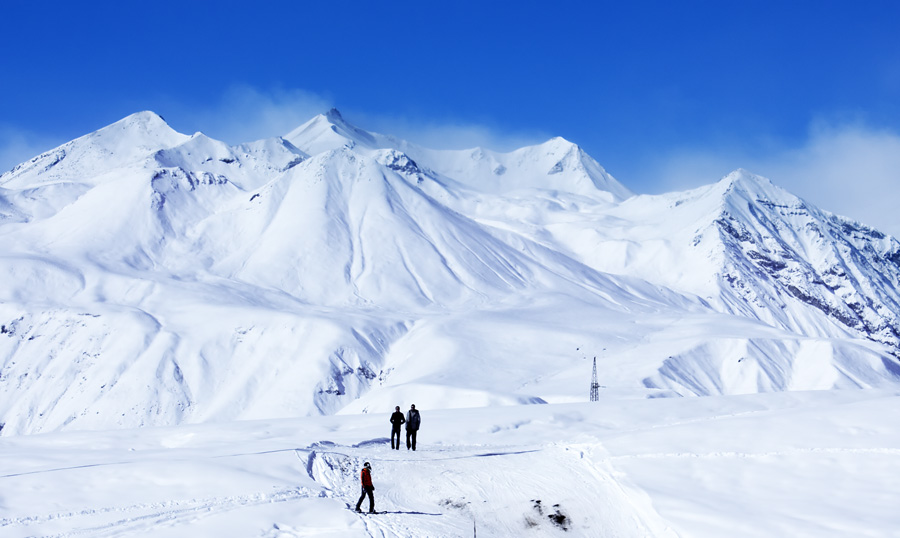
Gudauri ski resort

| Destinations | Attractions |
|---|---|
| Tbilisi | Old Tbilisi • Narikala • Rustaveli Avenue and Freedom Square • Funicular • "Dry bridge" • Agmashenebeli Avenue • Simon Janashia Museum of Georgia • Art Museum of Georgia • Gabriadze Theater • Holy Trinity Cathedral • Ethnographic Museum • Tbilisi Botanical Garden • Lisi Lake • Rike park • Sioni Cathedral • Anchiskhati Basilica • Chardin street • Mtatsminda Park |
| Mtskheta | UNESCO World Heritage Sites: Svetitskhoveli Cathedral, Jvari Monastery, St. Nino Monastery • Bebristsikhe • Armaztsikhe (Bagineti) • Armazi Fortress • Monastery of Shio Mghvime • Zedazeni • Ilia Chavchavadze Saguramo State Museum |
| Gori | Gori Fortress • Virgin Mary Cathedral • Historical-Ethnographic Museum • State Museum of Joseph Stalin • Museum of Military Glory • Gorijvari (resort) • Uplistsikhe • Ateni Gorge • Village Gardateni • Ruisi Cathedral of Transfiguration • Urbnisi Cathedral |
| Zugdidi | Dadiani Palace History and Architectural Museum • Ganmukhuri and Anaklia (Black Sea Resorts) • Kolkheti National Park • The swinging rock – "Kuakantsalia" • Khobi Monastery • Skuri (resort) • Complex of "Otsindale" • Shurubumu (wonder of the natural world) • Canyon of Intsra • Enguri Hydropower Plant |
| Kutaisi | UNESCO World Heritage Sites: Bagrati Cathedral, Gelati Monastery • Motsameta Monastery • Kutaisi State Historical Museum • National Museum of Military Glory • Historical district of the city • Vani Archeological Museum • Sataplia Nature Reserve • Prometheus Cave • Katskhi Pillar • Okatse Canyon |
| Telavi | Telavi State History and Ethnography Museum • Cholokashvili Street • Batonis Tsikhe Castle • Nadikvari Park • Giant Plane tree • Old Shuamta (one of the olsdest Orthodox churches in Georgia) • New Shuamta • Ikalto • Alexandre Chavchavadze Tsinandali Museum • Alaverdi Monastery |
| Mestia | UNESCO World Heritage Sites: Ushguli (one of the highest settlements in Europe) • Svaneti Historic and Ethnography Museum • Museum of Michael Khergiani • Transfiguration Cathedral in Laghami • Ski lift and the view from Zuruldi • Chalaadi Glacier • Kala settlement • Village Adishi • Ipari-Nakipari Church of St. George • Latali Church of the Lord • Hiking • Camping |
| Stepantsminda | Stepantsminda Historic Museum • Gergeti Trinity Church • Gveleti Waterfall • Devdoraki Glacier • Dariali Gorge • Upper Truso Gorge • Khdi Gorge • Gorge of Artkhmo • Village Sno • Juta • Hiking • Camping |
| Borjomi | Blue Palace "Firuza" • Mineral Water Park • Borjomi Museum of Local Lore • Gogia’s Castle • Peter’s Castle • Likani Palace • Borjomi-Kharagauli National Park • Timotesubani Monastery - The Cathedral of Holy Virgin • The Green Monastery • Kvabiskhevi Church of the Assumption |
| Batumi | Beaches of Adjara • Old Batumi • Batumi Boulevard • Batumi Botanical Garden • Dolphinarium • Piazza Batumi • "Argo" Entertainment Center and Batumi Cable Car • Gonio Fortress • Makhuntseti Waterfall • Skhalta Monastery • Mtirala National Park |
| Akhaltsikhe | Rabati Castle • Atskuri Fortress • Sapara Monastery • Vardzia (cave town) • Khertvisi Fortress • Georgian National Astrophysical Observatory • Akhaltsikhe Synagogue |
| Kvareli | Kindzmarauli vineyard • Khareba vineyard • Ilia Lake resort • House-Museum of Ilia Chavchavadze • Kvareli Fortress |
| Sighnaghi | Town Streets, Museum of Sighnaghi • St. Stephen Church • Wineries • Bodbe Monastery |
| Gudauri | Skiing • Paragliding • Heli-skiing • Speedriding • Snowboarding • Ski school |
| Bakuriani | Skiing • Snowboarding • Recreation • Bakuriani Park • Snowmobiling |
| Tetnuldi | Skiing • Mountaineering • Snowboarding |
| Goderdzi | Skiing • Snowboarding • Freeriding |

== Winemaking ==
Georgia is one of the oldest wine regions in the world, and winemaking is deeply ingrained in the culture of the country. The oldest archaeological remains related to grape seeds and winemaking dating back 8,000 years have been found at an archeological site at Gadachrili Gora, in Georgia, while today the country has over 500 varieties of grape. As of 2019, Georgia has 20 appellations of origin of wines, they are: Tsinandali, Napareuli, Atenuri, Kindzmarauli, Akhasheni, Mukuzani, Khvanchkara, etc.

== Ecotourism ==
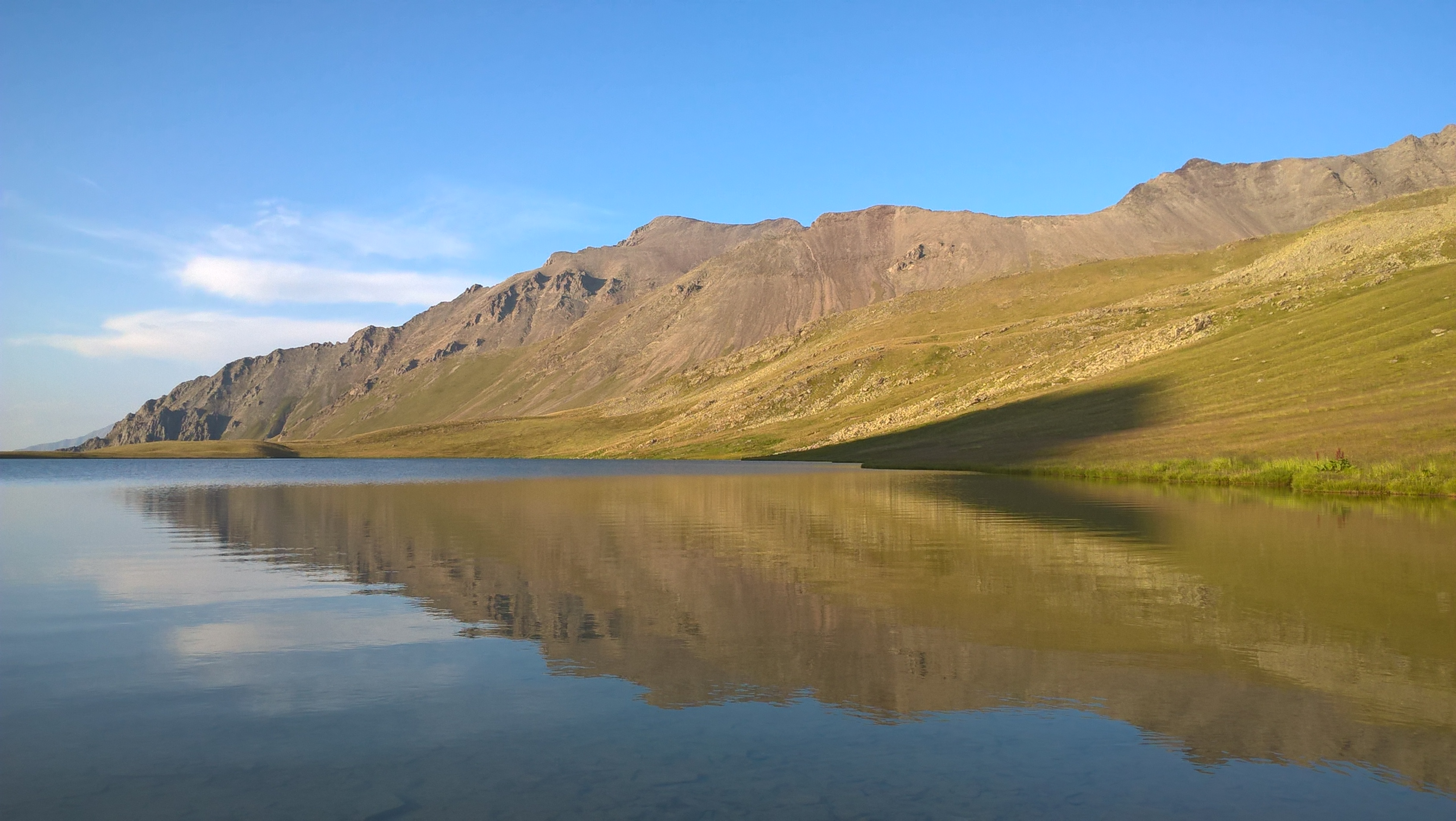
Lake Grdzeli (3,000 m asl), Lagodekhi Protected Area

41 percent of Georgia's territory is covered by forests, with 25 percent of Georgia's territory lying within protected national parks. Protected areas of Georgia offer various services including: boating tours, birdwatching, eco-educational tours, hiking, horse riding, biking, safari tours, sport fishing. Georgia is a home to about 5,601 species of animals, including 648 species of vertebrates (more than 1 percent of the species found worldwide) and many of these species are endemics.

In 2016, 310,477 foreign and 424,397 Georgian citizens visited the Protected Areas of Georgia. The most popular attractions were Prometheus Cave, Kazbegi National Park and Sataplia Managed Reserve.

== Safety ==
Countries that granted to Georgia the 'Safe Country' status

A travel advisory was in place during and after the 2008 Russo-Georgian War. It had the severity level of "extreme danger", due to the risks associated with fallout from the war, including land mines.

Since then, tourist safety has improved, and in 2017, the International Crime Index ranked Georgia as the 7th safest country out of the 125 in its index.

== Practical information ==
Georgia uses the standard Europlug (220 V, 50 Hz), the international dialing prefix is +995, it uses the metric system, and its currency is the lari (GEL or ₾).

=== Mandatory travel insurance ===
Foreign visitors to Georgia are required, under Decree No. 602 of the Government of Georgia (adopted 26 December 2025 and effective 1 January 2026), to hold travel medical insurance for the duration of their stay, with a minimum coverage limit of 30,000 GEL (approximately 11,000 USD). Proof of insurance is verified at land and air border crossings alongside the passport. Diplomats, certain treaty-country nationals, and air transit passengers who do not clear passport control are exempt. See Visa policy of Georgia#Mandatory travel insurance for full regulatory detail.

== See also ==
- Visa policy of Georgia
- List of airports in Georgia (country)
