= Visa requirements for Georgian citizens =

Administrative entry restrictions

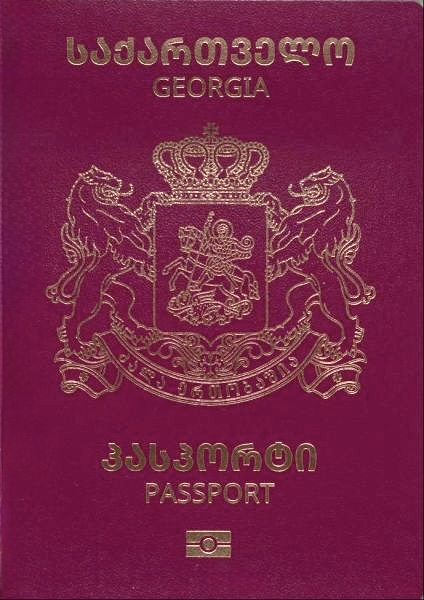
Georgian new biometric passport cover

Visa requirements for Georgian citizens are administrative entry restrictions by the authorities of other states placed on citizens of Georgia.

As of 2026, Georgian citizens had visa-free or visa on arrival access to 120 countries and territories, ranking the Georgian passport 41st, according to the Henley Passport Index.

Georgian citizens in other countries also can benefit from the Agreement on Visa-Free Movement of Citizens of the Commonwealth of Independent States across the Territory of its Participants signed on 09 October 1992 and the CIS Convention on Legal Assistance and Legal Relations in Civil, Family and Criminal Cases signed on 22 January 1993.

== Visa requirements map ==
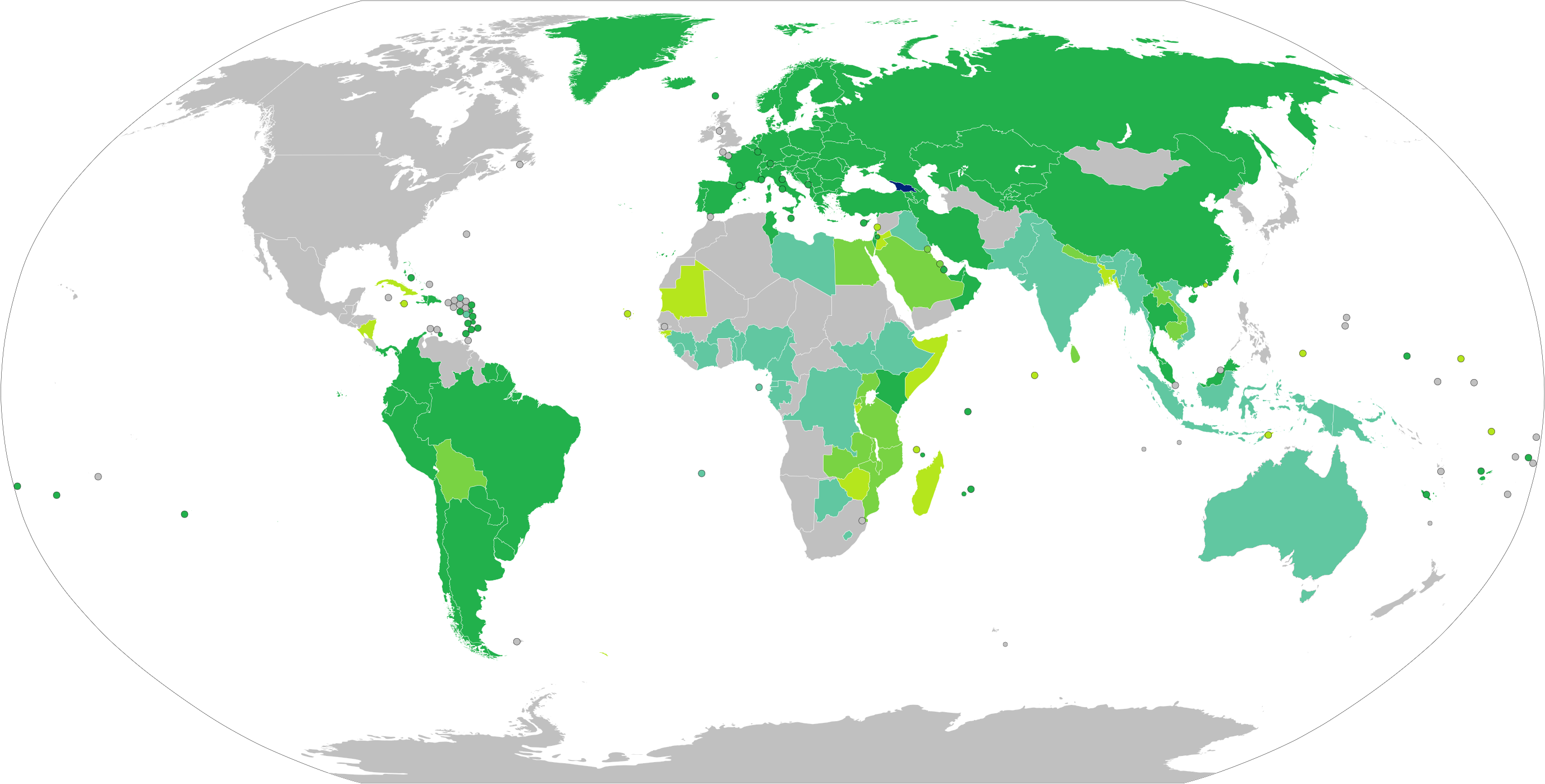
Visa requirements for Georgian citizens holding ordinary passports Georgia Visa-free Visa available both on arrival or online Visa on arrival eVisa Visa required

== Visa requirements ==
| Country | Visa requirement | Allowed stay | Notes (excluding departure fees) |
|---|---|---|---|
| Afghanistan | eVisa | 30 days | Visa is not required in case born in Afghanistan or can proof that one of their parents is a national of Afghanistan or born in Afghanistan.; e-Visa : Visitors must arrive at Kabul International (KBL). |
| Albania | Visa not required | 90 days | 90 days within any 180 day period. |
| Algeria | Visa required | | |
| Andorra | Visa not required | | Andorra does not have its own visa policy. The Schengen Area visa policy applies to Andorra. |
| Angola | Visa required | | |
| Antigua and Barbuda | Visa not required | 180 days | |
| Argentina | Visa not required | 90 days | |
| Armenia | Visa not required | 180 days | ID card valid for entry to Armenia for Georgians, passport not required. |
| Australia | eVisa | | May apply online (Online Visitor e600 visa). |
| Austria | Visa not required | 90 days | 90 days within any 180 day period in the Schengen Area. (Note: Holders of biometric passports only.) |
| Azerbaijan | Visa not required | 90 days | |
| Bahamas | Visa not required | 90 days | |
| Bahrain | eVisa / Visa on arrival | 14 days | |
| Bangladesh | Visa on arrival | 30 days | |
| Barbados | Visa not required | 28 days | |
| Belarus | Visa not required | 90 days | |
| Belgium | Visa not required | 90 days | 90 days within any 180 day period in the Schengen Area. |
| Belize | Visa required | | |
| Benin | eVisa | 30 days | Must have an international vaccination certificate. |
| Bhutan | eVisa | | |
| Bolivia | Online Visa / Visa on arrival | 30 days | |
| Bosnia and Herzegovina | Visa not required | 90 days | 90 days within any 180 day period. |
| Botswana | eVisa | 3 months | |
| Brazil | Visa not required | 90 days | 90 days within any 180 day period. |
| Brunei | Visa required | | |
| Bulgaria | Visa not required | 90 days | 90 days within any 180 day period in the Schengen Area. |
| Burkina Faso | eVisa | | |
| Burundi | Visa on arrival | 1 month | |
| Cambodia | eVisa / Visa on arrival | 30 days | |
| Cameroon | eVisa | | |
| Canada | Visa required | | |
| Cape Verde | Visa on arrival | | |
| Central African Republic | Visa required | | |
| Chad | Visa required | | |
| Chile | Visa not required | 90 days | 90 days within any 180 day period. |
| China | Visa not required | 30 days | A maximum of 90 days within any 180 day period. |
| Colombia | Visa not required | 90 days | |
| Comoros | Visa on arrival | 45 days | |
| Republic of the Congo | Visa required | | |
| Democratic Republic of the Congo | eVisa | 7 days | |
| Costa Rica | Visa required | | 90 days visa free if holding a valid, multiple-entry visa or residence permit issued by the Canada or the United States, or permanent resident card issued by the United Kingdom or the Schengen Area |
| Côte d'Ivoire | eVisa | 3 months | e-Visa holders must arrive via Port Bouet Airport. |
| Croatia | Visa not required | 90 days | 90 days within any 180 day period in the Schengen Area. |
| Cuba | eVisa | 90 days | Can be extended up to 90 days with a fee. |
| Cyprus | Visa not required | 90 days | 90 days within any 180 day period. |
| Czech Republic | Visa not required | 90 days | 90 days within any 180 day period in the Schengen Area. |
| Denmark | Visa not required | 90 days | 90 days within any 180 day period in the Schengen Area. |
| Djibouti | eVisa | 90 days | |
| Dominica | Visa not required | 21 days | |
| Dominican Republic | Visa not required | 60 days | |
| Ecuador | Visa not required | 90 days | |
| Egypt | eVisa / Visa on arrival | 30 days | |
| El Salvador | Visa required | | 90 days visa free if hold multiple entries visa or permanent resident card issued by Canada, the United States or the Schengen Area |
| Equatorial Guinea | eVisa | | |
| Eritrea | Visa required | | |
| Estonia | Visa not required | 90 days | 90 days within any 180 day period in the Schengen Area. |
| Eswatini | Visa required | | |
| Ethiopia | eVisa | up to 90 days | e-Visa holders must arrive via Addis Ababa Bole International Airport. |
| Fiji | Visa not required | 4 months | |
| Finland | Visa not required | 90 days | 90 days within any 180 day period in the Schengen Area. |
| France | Visa not required | 90 days | 90 days within any 180 day period in the Schengen Area. |
| Gabon | eVisa | 90 days | e-visa holders must arrive via Libreville International Airport. |
| Gambia | Visa required | | |
| Germany | Visa not required | 90 days | 90 days within any 180 day period in the Schengen Area. |
| Ghana | Visa required | | |
| Greece | Visa not required | 90 days | 90 days within any 180 day period in the Schengen Area. |
| Grenada | Visa not required | 90 days | |
| Guatemala | Visa required | | 90 days visa free if hold multiple entries visa or permanent resident card issued by Canada, the United States or the Schengen Area |
| Guinea | eVisa | 90 days | |
| Guinea-Bissau | Visa on arrival | 90 days | |
| Guyana | Visa required | | |
| Haiti | Visa not required | 90 days | |
| Honduras | Visa required | | 90 days visa free if hold multiple entries visa or permanent resident card issued by Canada, the United States or the Schengen Area |
| Hungary | Visa not required | 90 days | 90 days within any 180 day period in the Schengen Area. |
| Iceland | Visa not required | 90 days | 90 days within any 180 day period in the Schengen Area. |
| India | eVisa | 30 days | e-Visa holders must arrive via 32 designated airports (Note: Ahmedabad; Amritsar; Bagdogra; Bengaluru; Bhubaneswar; Chandigarh; Chennai; Coimbatore; Delhi; Gaya; Goa-Dabolim; Goa-Manohar; Guwahati; Hyderabad; Indore; Jaipur; Kannur; Kochi; Kolkata; Kozhikode; Lucknow; Madurai; Mangaluru; Mumbai; Nagpur; Port Blair; Pune; Surat; Thiruvananthapuram; Tiruchirappalli; Varanasi; Visakhapatnam) or 5 designated seaports. (Note: Chennai; Cochin; Mormugao (Goa); Mumbai; Mangalore); An Indian e-Tourist Visa may only be obtained twice within 1 calendar year.; Foreigners of Pakistani origin or who hold a Pakistani Passport are not eligible for an e-Visa. Foreigners who are not Pakistani nationals, but whose parents or grandparents (either paternal or maternal) were born in, or were permanent residents in Pakistan, are also not eligible for an e-Visa. |
| Indonesia | eVisa | | |
| Iran | Visa not required | 45 days | |
| Iraq | eVisa | | |
| Ireland | Visa required | | |
| Israel | ETA-IL | 90 days | |
| Italy | Visa not required | 90 days | 90 days within any 180 day period in the Schengen Area. |
| Jamaica | Visa on arrival | | |
| Japan | Visa required | | |
| Jordan | eVisa / Visa on arrival | 90 days | |
| Kazakhstan | Visa not required | 90 days | |
| Kenya | Electronic Travel Authorisation | 90 days | Applications can be submitted up to 90 days prior to travel and must be submitted at least 3 days in advance.; eTA fee is 32.50 USD.; Proof of reservation at the hotel where visitors plan to stay is required (if staying with friends, an invitation letter is also acceptable).; Yellow fever vaccination certificate is required if coming from endemic countries. |
| Kiribati | Visa required | | |
| North Korea | Visa required | | |
| South Korea | Visa required | | Visa-free access to Jeju Island for 30 days. |
| Kuwait | eVisa / Visa on arrival | 90 days | |
| Kyrgyzstan | Visa not required | 90 days | |
| Laos | eVisa / Visa on arrival | 30 days | 18 (Note: Savannakhet Airport; Lanetoui - Mengkang (China); Meuangmom - Wan Pong (Myanmar); Banvang - Ban Khok Phai (Thailand); Namngeun - Huay Kon (Thailand); Paksan - Bueng Kan (Thailand); Paktaphan - Pak Saeng (Thailand); Pangmon - Ban Huak (Thailand); Phoudou (Thailand); Dak ta ock - Nam Giang (Vietnam); La Lai (Vietnam); Namkan (Vietnam); Namphao - Cau Treo (Vietnam); Namsoy - Na Meo (Vietnam); Naphao - Cha Lo (Vietnam); Pahang - Long Sap (Vietnam); Panghok - Tây Trang (Vietnam); Phoukeua - Bo Y (Vietnam)) of the 33 border crossings are only open to regular visa holders.; e-Visa may be used to enter Laos through the Luang Prabang, Pakse and Vientiane international airports, 3 Thai-Lao Friendship Bridges (Note: Vientiane (Friendship Bridge 1); Savannakhet (Friendship Bridge 2); Bokeo (Friendship Bridge 4)), in Boten (road and railroad), and in Vientiane (at Khamsavath railway station).; Visa on arrival is available at the Luang Prabang, Pakse and Vientiane international airports, 4 Thai-Lao Friendship Bridges (Note: Vientiane (Friendship Bridge 1); Savannakhet (Friendship Bridge 2); Khammouane (Friendship Bridge 3); Bokeo (Friendship Bridge 4)) and 7 border crossings. (Note: Nongnokkheane - Trapeang Kriel (Cambodia); Boten - Bo han (China); Golden Triangle/Samliemkham (Thailand); Khamsavath railway station (Thailand); Namheuang - Ban Na Kraseng (Thailand); Vang tao - Chongmek (Thailand); Dansavan - Lao Bảo (Vietnam)) |
| Latvia | Visa not required | 90 days | 90 days within any 180 day period in the Schengen Area |
| Lebanon | Free visa on arrival | 30 days | 1 month extendable for 2 additional months.; Granted free of charge at Beirut International Airport or any other port of entry if there is no Israeli visa or seal, holding a telephone number, an address in Lebanon, and a non refundable return or circle trip ticket. |
| Lesotho | eVisa | | |
| Liberia | Visa required | | |
| Libya | eVisa | | |
| Liechtenstein | Visa not required | 90 days | 90 days within any 180 day period in the Schengen Area. |
| Lithuania | Visa not required | 90 days | 90 days within any 180 day period in the Schengen Area. |
| Luxembourg | Visa not required | 90 days | 90 days within any 180 day period in the Schengen Area. |
| Madagascar | eVisa / Visa on arrival | 60 days | |
| Malawi | eVisa / Visa on arrival | 90 days | |
| Malaysia | Visa not required | 30 days | |
| Maldives | Free visa on arrival | 30 days | |
| Mali | Visa required | | |
| Malta | Visa not required | 90 days | 90 days within any 180 day period in the Schengen Area. |
| Marshall Islands | Visa on arrival | 90 days | |
| Mauritania | eVisa | | Available at Nouakchott–Oumtounsy International Airport. |
| Mauritius | Visa not required | 90 days | 90 days within any 360 day period. |
| Mexico | Visa required | | Mexican visas aren't needed for stays under 180 days for tourism, transit, or unpaid activities if the individual holds a valid multiple entry visa or permanent residency from specified countries, including the US, Canada, Japan, the UK, and Schengen countries. Switzerland's "C" permit is considered equivalent to a permanent residency. Holders of Switzerland's "B" permit from visa-required countries must apply for a Mexican visa at the embassy. |
| Micronesia | Visa not required | 30 days | |
| Moldova | Visa not required | 90 days | 90 days within any 180-day period. |
| Monaco | Visa not required | | Monaco has no its own visa policy, visa policy of the Schengen area covers staying in Monaco. |
| Mongolia | Visa required | | |
| Montenegro | Visa not required | 90 days | |
| Morocco | Visa required | | |
| Mozambique | eVisa / Visa on arrival | 30 days | |
| Myanmar | eVisa | 28 days | e-Visa holders must arrive via Yangon, Nay Pyi Taw or Mandalay airports or via land border crossings with Thailand — Tachileik, Myawaddy and Kawthaung or India — Rih Khaw Dar and Tamu.; e-Visa is available for tourism only. |
| Namibia | Visa required | | |
| Nauru | Visa required | | |
| Nepal | Online Visa / Visa on arrival | 90 days | |
| Netherlands | Visa not required | 90 days | 90 days within any 180 day period in the Schengen Area. |
| New Zealand | Visa required | | Diplomatic, service and standard passports with the former USSR symbol issued in Georgia are unacceptable, and visas will not be endorsed in them.; Holders of an Australian Permanent Resident Visa or Resident Return Visa may be granted a New Zealand Resident Visa on arrival permitting indefinite stay (pursuant to the Trans-Tasman Travel Arrangement), subject to meeting character requirements and obtaining an Electronic Travel Authority prior to departure. |
| Nicaragua | Visa on arrival | 90 days | |
| Niger | Visa required | | |
| Nigeria | eVisa | 90 days | |
| North Macedonia | Visa not required | 90 days | 90 days within any 180 day period. |
| Norway | Visa not required | 90 days | 90 days within any 180 day period in the Schengen Area. |
| Oman | Visa not required | 14 days | 30 days e-Visa also available |
| Pakistan | eVisa | 90 days | |
| Palau | Free visa on arrival | 30 days | |
| Panama | Visa not required | 90 days | 90 days within any 180 day period. |
| Papua New Guinea | Easy Visitor Permit | 60 days | Visitors may apply for a visa online under the "Tourist - Own Itinerary" category. |
| Paraguay | Visa not required | 90 days | 90 days within any 180 day period. |
| Peru | Visa not required | 90 days | 90 days within any 180 day period. |
| Philippines | Visa required | | Residents of the United Arab Emirates may obtain an eVisa through the official Philippine eVisa website. A valid Emirati residence visa must be shown upon an eVisa application. |
| Poland | Visa not required | 90 days | 90 days within any 180 day period in the Schengen Area. |
| Portugal | Visa not required | 90 days | 90 days within any 180 day period in the Schengen Area. |
| Qatar | Visa not required | 30 days | |
| Romania | Visa not required | 90 days | 90 days within any 180 day period in the Schengen Area. |
| Russia | Visa not required | Unlimited for the duration of study or work. | |
| Rwanda | eVisa / Visa on arrival | 30 days | |
| Saint Kitts and Nevis | Electronic Travel Authorisation | 90 days | 90 days within any 180 day period. |
| Saint Lucia | Visa not required | 6 weeks | |
| Saint Vincent and the Grenadines | Visa not required | 3 months | |
| Samoa | Visa not required | 90 days | |
| San Marino | Visa not required | | San Marino has no its own visa policy, visa policy of the Schengen area covers staying in San Marino. |
| São Tomé and Príncipe | eVisa | | |
| Saudi Arabia | eVisa / Visa on arrival | 90 days | |
| Senegal | Visa required | | |
| Serbia | Visa not required | 90 days | 90 days within any 180 day period. |
| Seychelles | Electronic Border System | 3 months | Application can be submitted up to 30 days before travel.; Visitors must upload a reservation confirmation(s) for each visitor's location of stay in Seychelles.; Yellow fever vaccination certificate is required if coming from endemic countries.; Payment of the fee (EUR 10) by credit or debit card.; Valid for one journey only and it expires once exit the country. |
| Sierra Leone | eVisa | 3 months | |
| Singapore | eVisa | | May obtain an e-Visa through authorized travel agencies or through local sponsors (Singapore citizens or permanent residents).[248]; Visa-free transit for 96 hours. Visa application can be submitted online using the 'e-Service' through a strategic partner or a local contact in Singapore. |
| Slovakia | Visa not required | 90 days | 90 days within any 180 day period in the Schengen Area. |
| Slovenia | Visa not required | 90 days | 90 days within any 180 day period in the Schengen Area. |
| Solomon Islands | Visa required | | |
| Somalia | eVisa | 30 days | All visitors must have an approved Electronic Visa (eTAS) before the start of their journey. |
| South Africa | Visa required | | Visa Free Access announced. Dates to be confirmed. |
| South Sudan | eVisa | | Obtainable online.; Printed visa authorization must be presented at the time of travel. |
| Spain | Visa not required | 90 days | 90 days within any 180 day period in the Schengen Area. |
| Sri Lanka | eVisa / Visa on arrival | 60 days / 30 days | Sri Lanka introduced an ETA valid for 30 days. |
| Sudan | Visa required | | |
| Suriname | Visa not required | 90 days | An entrance fee of USD 50 or EUR 50 must be paid online prior to arrival.; Multiple entry e-Visa is also available. |
| Sweden | Visa not required | 90 days | 90 days within any 180 day period in the Schengen Area. |
| Switzerland | Visa not required | 90 days | 90 days within any 180 day period in the Schengen Area. |
| Syria | Visa on arrival | 15 days | According to the Law No. 2 of 2014 all visitors require visas prior to arrival. According to the IATA database, visa may be obtained on arrival and is valid for 15 days. |
| Tajikistan | Visa not required | Unlimited | |
| Tanzania | eVisa / Visa on arrival | 90 days | |
| Thailand | Visa not required | 60 days | |
| Timor-Leste | Visa on arrival | 30 days | |
| Togo | eVisa | 15 days | |
| Tonga | Visa required | | |
| Trinidad and Tobago | Visa required | | |
| Tunisia | Visa not required (conditional) | 30 days | Visa not required for a booked package tour through a travel agency authorized by Tunisian government. |
| Turkey | Visa not required | 90 days | ID card valid for entry to Turkey for Georgians, passport not required. |
| Turkmenistan | eVisa | | |
| Tuvalu | Visa on arrival | 30 days | |
| Uganda | eVisa / Visa on arrival | 3 months | |
| Ukraine | Visa not required | 90 days | ID card valid for entry to Ukraine for Georgians, passport not required. |
| United Arab Emirates | Visa not required | 90 days | |
| United Kingdom | Visa required | | |
| United States | Visa required | | |
| Uruguay | Visa not required | 90 days | |
| Uzbekistan | Visa not required | Unlimited | |
| Vanuatu | Visa required | | |
| Vatican City | Visa not required | | Vatican City has no its own visa policy, visa policy of the Schengen area covers staying in Vatican City. |
| Venezuela | eVisa | | Introduction of Electronic Visa System for Tourist and Business Travelers. |
| Vietnam | eVisa | 90 days | Visa free when visit Phu Quoc Island |
| Yemen | Visa required | | |
| Zambia | eVisa / Visa on arrival | 90 days | |
| Zimbabwe | Visa on arrival | 30 days | Can be extended up to 90 days |

=== Dependent, Disputed, or Restricted territories ===
Unrecognized or partially recognized countries

| Visitor to | Conditions of access | Notes |
|---|---|---|
| Kosovo | Visa required | Visa not required for holders of a valid biometric residence permit issued by one of the Schengen member states or a valid multi-entry Schengen Visa, a holder of a valid Laissez-Passer issued by United Nations Organizations, NATO, OSCE, Council of Europe or European Union a holder of a valid travel documents issued by EU Member and Schengen States, United States of America, Canada, Australia and Japan based on the 1951 Convention on Refugee Status or the 1954 Convention on the Status of Stateless Persons, as well as holders of valid travel documents for foreigners (max. 15 days stay) |
| Northern Cyprus | Visa not required | |
| Palestine | Visa not required | Arrival by sea to Gaza Strip not allowed. |
| Somaliland | Visa on arrival | 30 days for 30 USD, payable on arrival. |
| Taiwan | Visa required | |
| Transnistria | Visa not required | Registration required after 24h. |

Dependent and autonomous territories

| Visitor to | Conditions of access | Notes |
China
| Hong Kong | Visa not required | 30 days |
| Macau | Visa on arrival | 30 days |
Denmark
| Faroe Islands | Visa not required | |
| Greenland | Visa not required | |
France
| French Guiana | Visa required | |
| French Polynesia | Visa required | |
| (France) French West Indies | Visa required | French West Indies refers to Martinique, Guadeloupe, Saint Martin and Saint Barthélemy. |
| Mayotte | Visa required | |
| New Caledonia | Visa not required | 90 days within any 180 day period |
| Réunion | Visa required | |
| Saint Pierre and Miquelon | Visa required | |
| Wallis and Futuna | Visa required | |
Netherlands
| Aruba | eVisa | 30 days |
| Caribbean Netherlands (includes Bonaire, Sint Eustatius and Saba) | Visa required | |
| Curaçao | Visa required | |
| Sint Maarten | Visa required | |
New Zealand
| Cook Islands | Visa not required | 31 days |
| Niue | Visa not required | 30 days |
| Tokelau | Visa required | |
United Kingdom
| Anguilla | eVisa | Holders of a valid visa issued by the United Kingdom do not require a visa. |
| Bermuda | Visa required | Visa free for a maximum stay of 90 days if transiting through the United Kingdom. |
| British Indian Ocean Territory | Special permit required | Special permit required. |
| British Virgin Islands | Visa required | |
| Cayman Islands | Visa required | |
| Falkland Islands | Visa required | |
| Gibraltar | Visa required | |
| Montserrat | eVisa | |
| Pitcairn Islands | Visa not required | 14 days visa free and landing fee 35 USD or tax of 5 USD if not going ashore. |
| Ascension Island | eVisa | 90 days within any year period. |
| Saint Helena | eVisa | |
| Tristan da Cunha | Permission required | Permission to land required for 15/30 pounds sterling (yacht/ship passenger) for Tristan da Cunha Island or 20 pounds sterling for Gough Island, Inaccessible Island or Nightingale Islands. |
| South Georgia and the South Sandwich Islands | Permit required | Pre-arrival permit from the Commissioner required (72 hours / 1 month for 110 / 160 pounds sterling). |
| Turks and Caicos Islands | Visa required | Holders of a valid visa issued by Canada, United Kingdom or the USA do not required a visa for a maximum stay of 90 days. |
United States
| American Samoa | eVisa | 30 days |
| Guam | Visa required | |
| Northern Mariana Islands | Visa required | |
| U.S. Virgin Islands | Visa required | |
Antarctica and adjacent islands
Special permits required for Bouvet Island, British Antarctic Territory, French Southern and Antarctic Lands, Argentine Antarctica, (Australia) Australian Antarctic Territory, (Antártica Chilena Province) Chilean Antarctic Territory, (Australia) Heard Island and McDonald Islands, (Norway) Peter I Island, (Norway) Queen Maud Land, (New Zealand) Ross Dependency.

== See also ==
- Visa policy of Georgia
- Georgian passport
