= Sataplia Strict Nature Reserve =

Protected nature area in the Republic of Georgia

- IUCN category Ia (strict nature reserve)
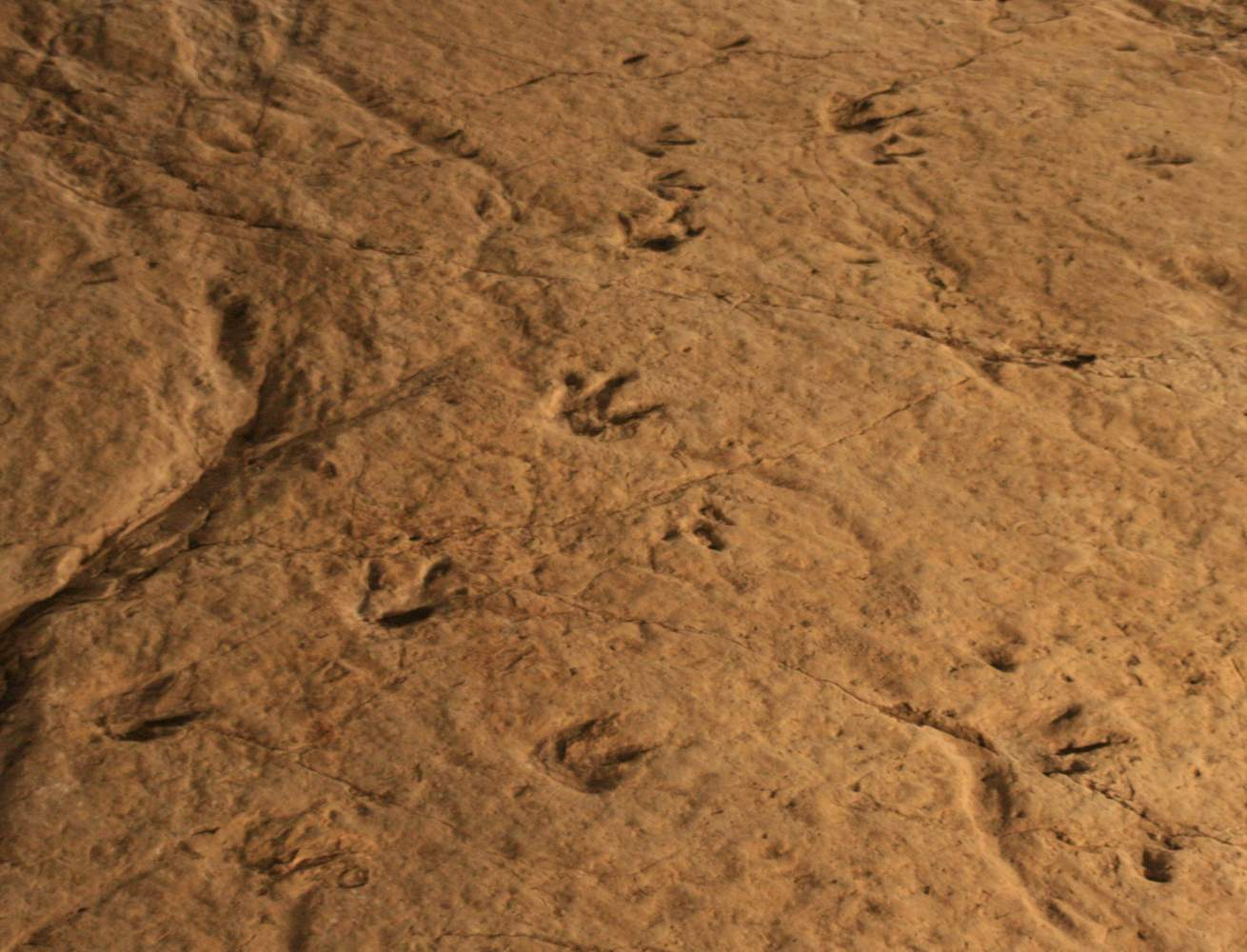
- Fossilized dinosaur footprints.

- Location within Imereti Location within Georgia
- Location: Georgia
- Nearest city: Tsqaltubo
- Coordinates: 42°18′58.2″N 42°40′21.6″E
- Area: 6.04 km^{2} (2.33 sq mi)
- Established: 1935
- Governing body: Agency of Protected Areas
- Website: Imereti Caves Protected Areas Administration

Sataplia Strict Nature Reserve (Georgian: სათაფლიის სახელმწიფო ნაკრძალი) is located 10 km from town of Kutaisi in Imereti region of Georgia. The visitor center is located north from Kutaisi in the Tsqaltubo Municipality, near the village Banoja at the slopes of the extinct volcano Mount Sataplia. The name Sataplia can be freely translated as a "honey place" (In Georgian language თაფლი, tapli means honey) and in fact bees used to live in small holes and caves and honey was harvested by the local population.

Sataplia Strict Nature Reserve is part of Imereti Caves Protected Areas, which also includes Sataplia Managed Reserve, Prometheus Cave Natural Monument.

== History ==
The Natural Park Sataplia was founded in 1935 to protect recently discovered karst cave with exotic stalactites and stalagmites as well Colchian forest, geological and archaeological sites, by Petre Chabukiani. Park was expanded to it present borders in 1957. In 2010 and 2011 the Sataplia Managed Reserve was developed to accommodate tourists: visitor center was built, a coffee house in the middle of the park, a small museum, a small park with dinosaur models and glass observation deck built above the cliff. Furthermore, the main karst cave was equipped with lighting effects and a secure footpath.

== Geography ==
Of the total area of 350 ha, 348 ha are covered with forests. Relief of the landscape is mountainous. The reservation features a crater of an extinct volcano, a site of remains of a man of the Stone Age and fossilized traces of dinosaurs. The largest cave of Sataplia was discovered in 1925 and is about 900 m long.

== Flora and fauna ==
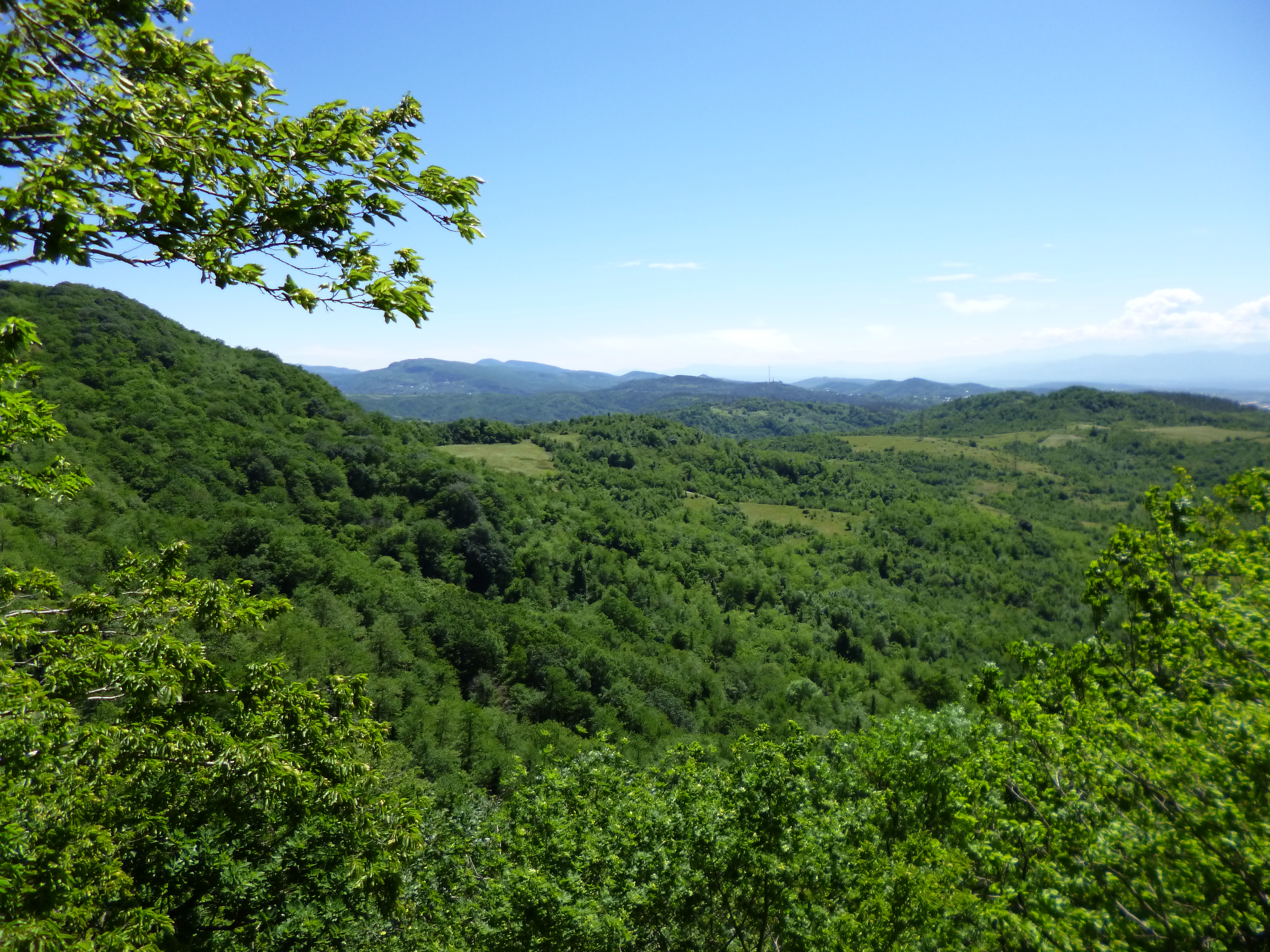
Mount Sataplia Colchian forest.

Mount Sataplia Colchian forest (98% of the area) has both the alpine flora and subtropical plants. There are many tree species threatened with extinction. Jackals, foxes, squirrels, martens and badgers belong to ordinary residents of the park. Occasionally there is a Roe deer and a wolf.

== See also ==
- List of protected areas of Georgia
- Sataplia Managed Reserve
