= Visa policy of Georgia =

Policy on permits required to enter Georgia

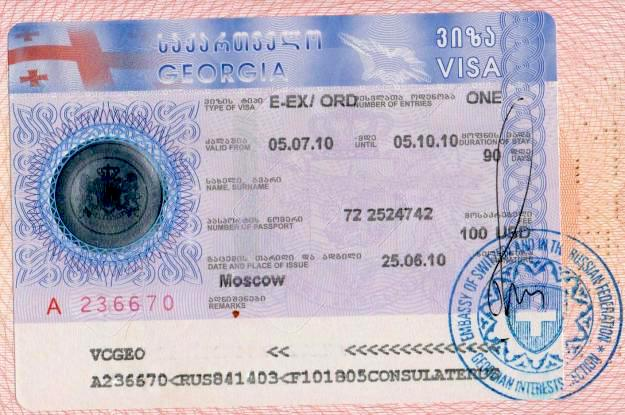
Georgian visa

Visitors to Georgia must obtain a visa from Georgian diplomatic missions unless they are citizens of one of the visa-exempt countries or one of the countries whose citizens may obtain an e-Visa.

All visitors must have a passport. However, citizens of certain countries may enter without a visa with an ID card in lieu of a passport.

In Georgia, as of 2024, the Agreement on Visa-Free Movement of Citizens of the Commonwealth of Independent States across the Territory of its Participants signed on 09 October 1992 and the CIS Convention on Legal Assistance and Legal Relations in Civil, Family and Criminal Cases signed on 22 January 1993 remain in force.

== Visa policy map ==
Visa policy of Georgia Georgia Visa not required (1 year) Visa not required (90 days) Visa not required (45 days) Visa not required (30 days) eVisa (90 days) eVisa (30 days) Visa required Admission refused

== Visa exemption ==
=== Ordinary passports ===
Georgia adopted a new law of on Legal Status of Alien and Stateless Persons that went into effect on 1 September 2014. It was amended on 9 June 2015 when the maximum allowed stay was extended to 1 year.

The list of countries whose citizens have the right of visa-free entry to Georgia is no longer provided in the new law, it is determined in the separate ordinance of the Government of Georgia. The visa-free list was re-approved on 9 June 2015.

Citizens of the following countries and territories may enter Georgia without a visa for the following period:

1 year

- European Union member states^{ID}

- Albania
- Andorra
- Antigua and Barbuda
- Argentina
- Armenia^{ID*}
- Australia
- Azerbaijan
- Bahamas
- Bahrain
- Barbados
- Belarus
- Belize
- Bosnia and Herzegovina
- Botswana
- Brazil
- Brunei
- Canada
- Colombia
- Costa Rica
- Dominica
- Dominican Republic
- Ecuador
- El Salvador
- Honduras
- Iceland
- Israel
- Japan
- Jordan
- Kazakhstan
- Kuwait
- Kyrgyzstan
- Lebanon
- Liechtenstein^{ID}
- Malaysia
- Mauritius
- Mexico
- Moldova
- Monaco
- Montenegro
- New Zealand
- Norway
- Oman
- Panama
- Qatar
- Russia
- Saint Vincent and the Grenadines
- San Marino
- Saudi Arabia
- Serbia
- Seychelles
- Singapore
- South Africa
- South Korea
- Switzerland^{ID}
- Tajikistan
- Thailand
- Turkey^{ID}
- Turkmenistan
- Ukraine^{ID*}
- United Arab Emirates
- United Kingdom^{A}
- United States
- Uzbekistan
- Vatican City

90 days

- Chile^{1}
- Fiji^{1}
- North Macedonia^{1}
- Paraguay^{1}
- Peru^{1}
- Uruguay

45 days

- Iran

30 days

- China^{B} ^{1}
- Hong Kong^{B} ^{1}
- Macau^{B} ^{1}

_{ID - May enter with an ID card (including Irish passport card).}
_{ID* - May enter with an ID card if arriving directly from the country of nationality.}
_{A - Also applies to holders of passports issued by Bermuda, British Virgin Islands, Cayman Islands, Falkland Islands, Gibraltar and Turks and Caicos Islands.}
_{B - For Chinese citizens with People's Republic of China passports, Hong Kong Special Administrative Region passports or Macau Special Administrative Region passports only.}
_{1 - No more than 90 days within any 180 days.}

Date of visa changes
- 11 September 2023: China
- 1 April 2024: Peru

Cancelled:

- 1 September 2014: Bolivia, Cuba, Dominica, Guatemala, Iraq, Paraguay, Peru, Saint Kitts and Nevis, Saint Lucia, Suriname and Trinidad and Tobago.

All visitors may enter without a visa if they meet one of the following conditions:

- Holders of United Nations laissez-passer (1 year)
- Holders of Interpol Travel Document (1 year)
- Georgian diaspora member (30 days)
- Persons with refugee status in Georgia

==== Substitute visa ====
Holders of valid visas or residence permits of the following countries may enter Georgia without a visa for a maximum of 90 days within any 180-day period:

- All European Union member states
- All European Free Trade Association member states
- (Cooperation Council for the Arab States of the Gulf) All Gulf Cooperation Council member states^{2}

- Australia
- Canada
- Israel
- Japan
- New Zealand
- South Korea
- United Kingdom^{1}
- United States

_{1 - Except Anguilla, Montserrat, Pitcairn, Saint Helena, Ascension Island and Tristan da Cunha.}
_{2 - For citizens of Afghanistan, Bangladesh, Cameroon, Democratic Republic of Congo, Eritrea, Ethiopia, Ghana, Ivory Coast, Morocco, Nigeria, Pakistan, Somalia, Syria, Sudan, Tanzania, Uganda and Yemen, the document must be valid for at least one year prior to arrival.}

=== Non-ordinary passports ===
In addition to countries whose citizens are visa-exempt, holders of diplomatic/official/service passports of Egypt, Guyana, Indonesia and Pakistan may enter Georgia without a visa.

== Electronic visa (e-Visa) ==
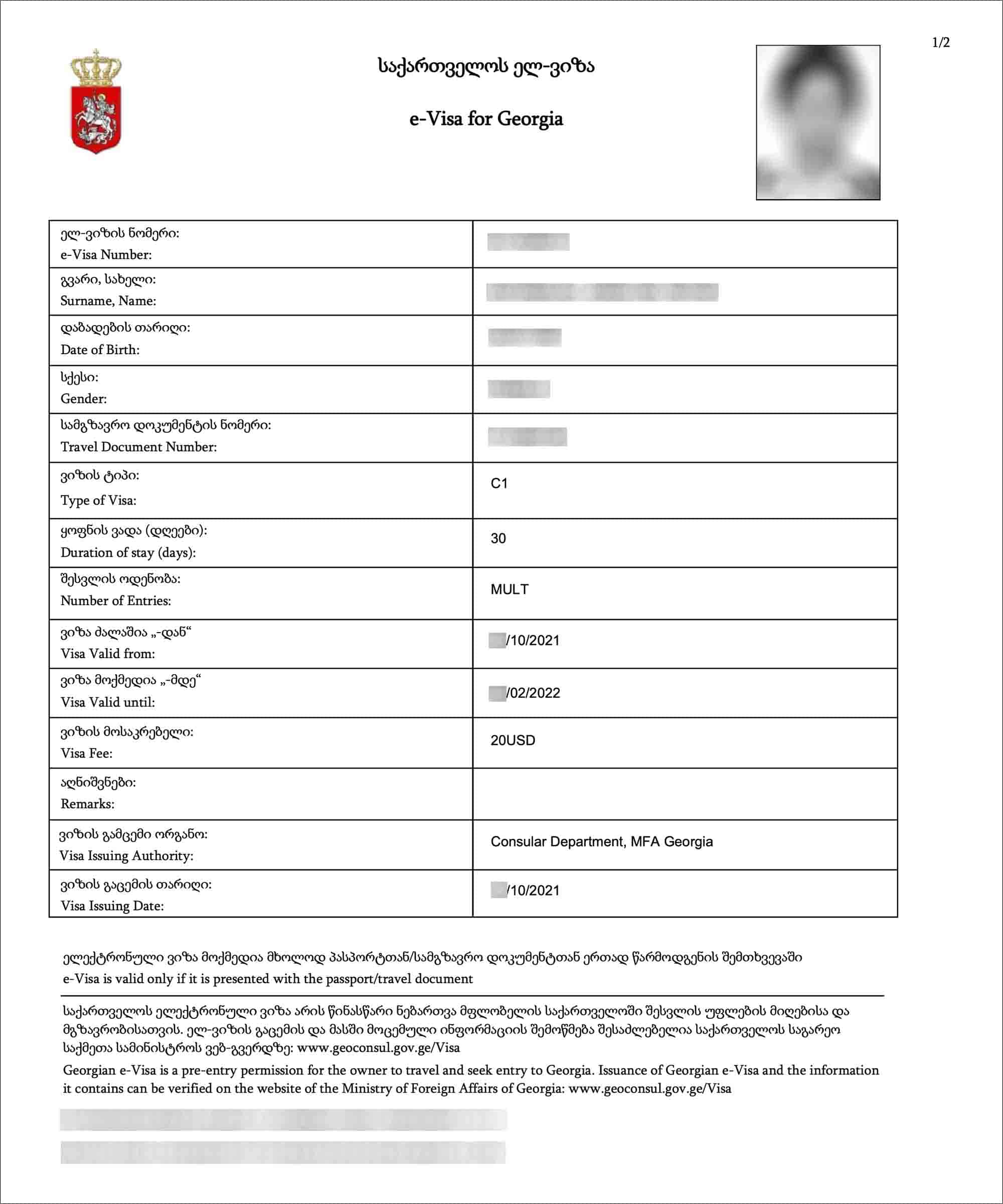
Sample of Georgian eVisa

Holders of passports of the following countries and territories may obtain a visa online.

90 days within a 180-day period

- Bolivia
- Cuba
- East Timor
- Grenada
- Guatemala
- Kiribati
- Marshall Islands
- Micronesia
- Palau
- Saint Kitts and Nevis
- Saint Lucia
- Samoa
- Solomon Islands
- Suriname
- Trinidad and Tobago
- Tuvalu
- Vanuatu

30 days within a 120-day period

- Benin
- Bhutan
- Cape Verde
- Central African Republic
- Comoros
- Djibouti
- Egypt
- Equatorial Guinea
- Eritrea
- Eswatini
- Ethiopia
- Guinea-Bissau
- Guyana
- Haiti
- India
- Indonesia
- Jamaica
- Laos
- Lesotho
- Madagascar
- Malawi
- Maldives
- Mongolia
- Mozambique
- Myanmar
- Namibia
- North Korea
- Papua New Guinea
- Philippines
- Rwanda
- São Tomé and Príncipe
- Togo
- Vietnam
- Zambia
- Zimbabwe

== Entry to Abkhazia and South Ossetia ==
Entering Abkhazia and South Ossetia (considered by Georgia and a major part of the international community to be Russian occupied territories) through border crossing points other than located in Georgia's Zugdidi Municipality and Gori Municipality is an act punishable under Georgian law. However, entering South Ossetia from the territory controlled by Georgian government is currently impossible.

== Admission restrictions ==
Entry and transit is refused to citizens of Kosovo, Palestine and Taiwan (visas can still be obtained on a case-by-case basis for holders of passports of Taiwan, including for participation in international conferences and sports events held in Georgia), even if not leaving the aircraft and proceeding by the same flight. Georgia also does not recognize the passports of Abkhazia, the Sahrawi Republic, Somaliland, South Ossetia and Transnistria.

== Mandatory travel insurance ==
Since 1 January 2026, foreign nationals entering Georgia are required to hold travel medical insurance valid for the duration of their stay, with a minimum coverage limit of 30,000 GEL (approximately 11,000 USD). The requirement was established by Decree No. 602 of the Government of Georgia, adopted on 26 December 2025.

== Visitor statistics ==
Most visitors arriving in Georgia were from the following countries of nationality (dynamic table including 2014):

Country	2023	2022	2021	2020	2019	2018	2017	2016	2015	2014
Turkey	1396660 ▲	925561 ▲	326494 ▲	335580 ▼	1156513 ▼	1312129 ▲	1247082 ▼	1254089 ▼	1391721 ▼	1442695
Azerbaijan	199835 ▲	152969 ▲	82718 ▼	295132 ▼	1526619 ▼	1807068 ▲	1695084 ▲	1523075 ▲	1393257 ▲	1283214
Armenia	962540 ▲	742593 ▲	164698 ▼	260965 ▼	1365048 ▼	1725163 ▲	1718243 ▲	1496246 ▲	1468888 ▲	1325635
Russia	1418464 ▲	1087257 ▲	212979 ▲	208677 ▼	1471558 ▼	1705142 ▲	1392842 ▲	1037564 ▲	926144 ▲	811621
EU-27	422227 ▲	272916 ▲	139157 ▲	65117 ▼	447518 ▲	355755 ▲	260920 ▲	214002 ▲	197427 ▲	186879
Ukraine	146931 ▼	168915 ▲	144901 ▲	42414 ▼	207667 ▲	204952 ▲	193127 ▲	172631 ▲	141734 ▼	143521
Israel	217065 ▲	210178 ▲	100686 ▲	25731 ▼	205051 ▲	173366 ▲	125320 ▲	92213 ▲	59487 ▲	42385
Iran	126282 ▲	102877 ▲	18549 ▲	17053 ▼	141997 ▼	339462 ▲	322898 ▲	147915 ▲	25273 ▼	47929
Kazakhstan	167492 ▲	120494 ▲	66787 ▲	13779 ▼	103611 ▲	68452 ▲	56801 ▲	48809 ▲	36777 ▲	28394
Belarus	130203 ▲	130046 ▲	53698 ▲	13340 ▼	66174 ▼	68360 ▲	32939 ▼	42149 ▲	25724 ▲	16577
Poland	91210 ▲	41917 ▲	30988 ▲	10691 ▼	88300 ▲	71668 ▲	48913 ▲	41609 ▲	39309 ▼	44415
Germany	68824 ▲	48548 ▲	21194 ▲	9338 ▼	89051 ▲	74131 ▲	43090 ▲	33469 ▲	30481 ▲	27073
India	84688 ▲	52841 ▲	24992 ▲	8364 ▼	54606 ▼	73458 ▲	59738 ▲	36410 ▲	12114 ▲	4679
USA	46735 ▲	35319 ▲	19470 ▲	7384 ▼	46558 ▲	41863 ▲	33569 ▲	27304 ▲	24978 ▲	22545
UK	30732 ▲	21407 ▲	7936 ▲	5625 ▼	37478 ▲	29406 ▲	22392 ▲	15470 ▼	16142 ▲	15732
Saudi Arabia	72953 ▼	119921 ▲	63437 ▲	4960 ▼	75155 ▲	65560 ▲	56247 ▲	21257 ▲	9850 ▲	5485
China	48304 ▲	7380 ▲	3468 ▼	4363 ▼	48071 ▲	31855 ▲	18179 ▲	10847 ▲	6849 ▲	5919
Total	7072220 ▲	5426903 ▲	1881271 ▲	1747110 ▼	9357964 ▲	8326252 ▲	7556339 ▲	6360503 ▲	5901.094 ▲	5515559

== See also ==
- Visa policy of Abkhazia
- Visa policy of South Ossetia
- Visa requirements for Georgian citizens
