= Sataplia Managed Reserve =

Protected nature area in Georgia

- Georgian: სათაფლიას აღკვეთილი
- IUCN category IV (habitat/species management area)
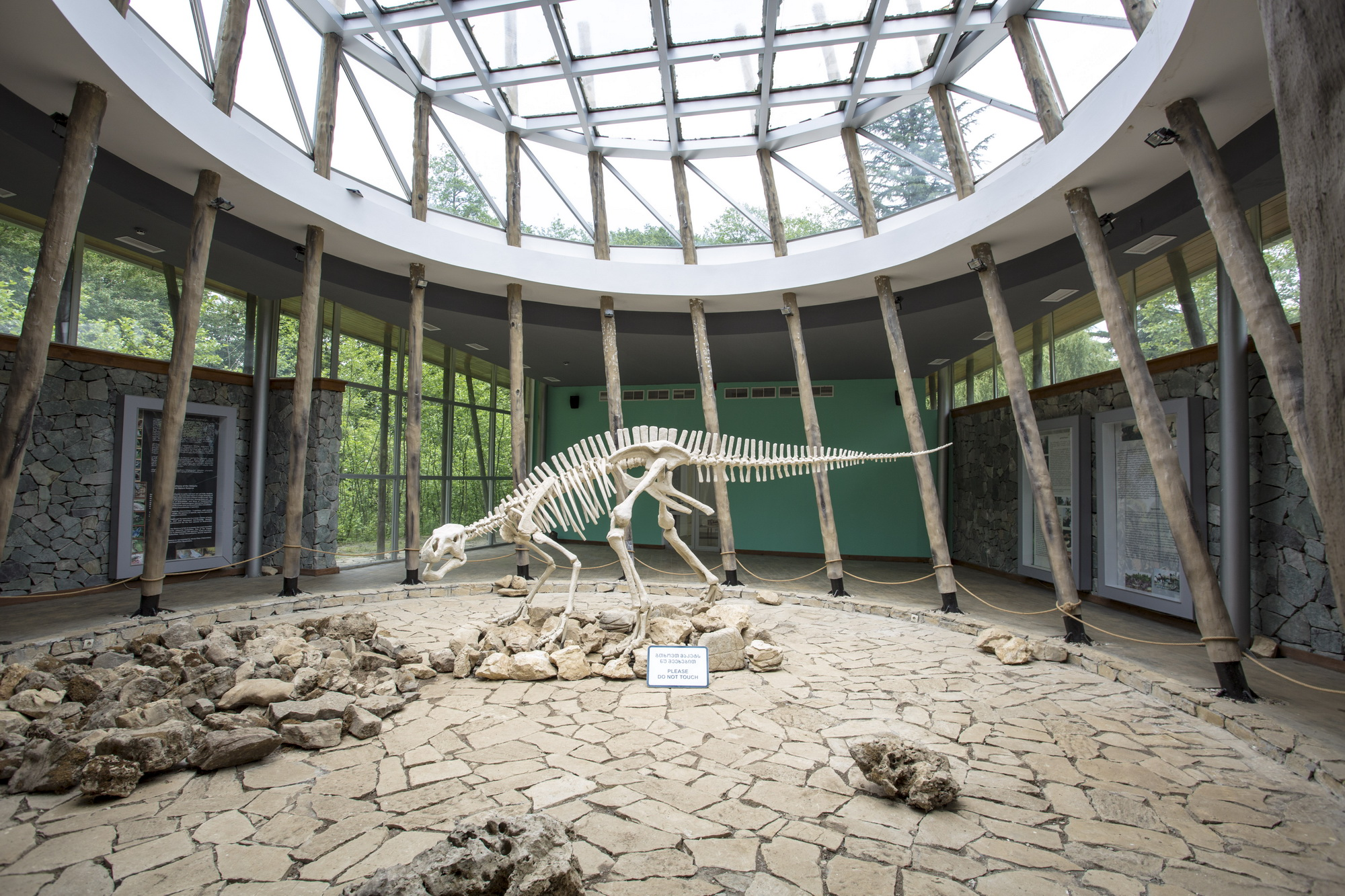
- Fossilized dinosaur footprints presentation in conservation building.

- Location within Imereti Location within Georgia
- Location: Georgia
- Nearest city: Tsqaltubo
- Coordinates: 42°18′41.5″N 42°40′30.9″E
- Area: 0.34 km^{2} (0.13 sq mi)
- Established: 2012
- Governing body: Agency of Protected Areas
- Website: Imereti Caves Protected Areas Administration

Sataplia Managed Reserve (Georgian: სათაფლიას აღკვეთილი) is a protected area and tourist attraction in Imereti region of Georgia, 10 km from town of Kutaisi. The visitor center is located north from Kutaisi in the Tsqaltubo Municipality, near the village Banoja at the slopes of the extinct volcano Mount Sataplia. The name Sataplia can be freely translated as a "honey place" (In Georgian language თაფლი, tapli means honey) and in fact bees used to live in small holes and caves and honey was harvested by the local population.

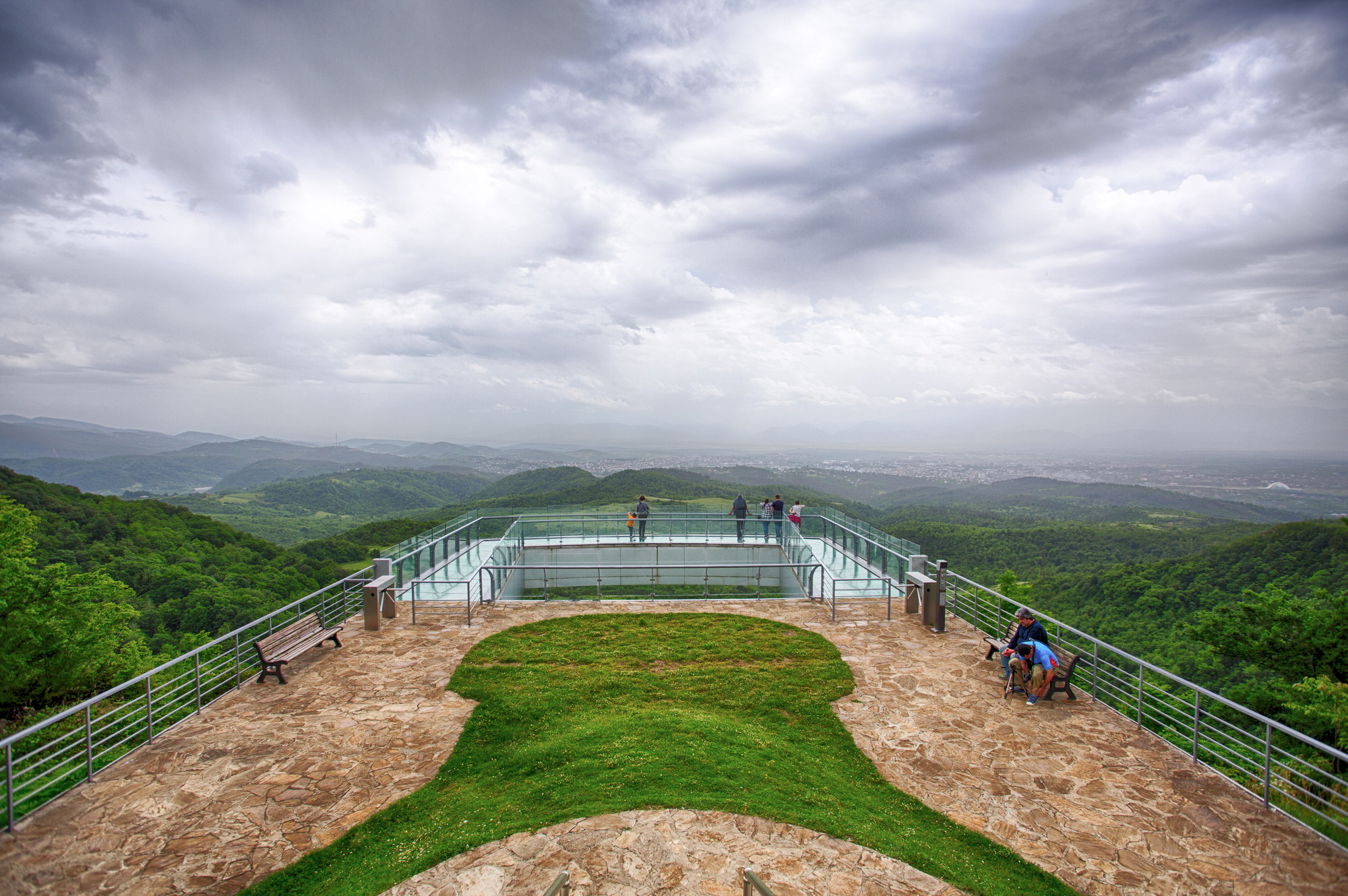
Observation deck in Sataplia Managed Reserve.

Sataplia Managed Reserve is part of Imereti Caves Protected Areas, which also includes Sataplia Strict Nature Reserve, Prometheus Cave Natural Monument.

== See also ==
- Sataplia Strict Nature Reserve
