= Mobility rights arrangements of the Commonwealth of Independent States =

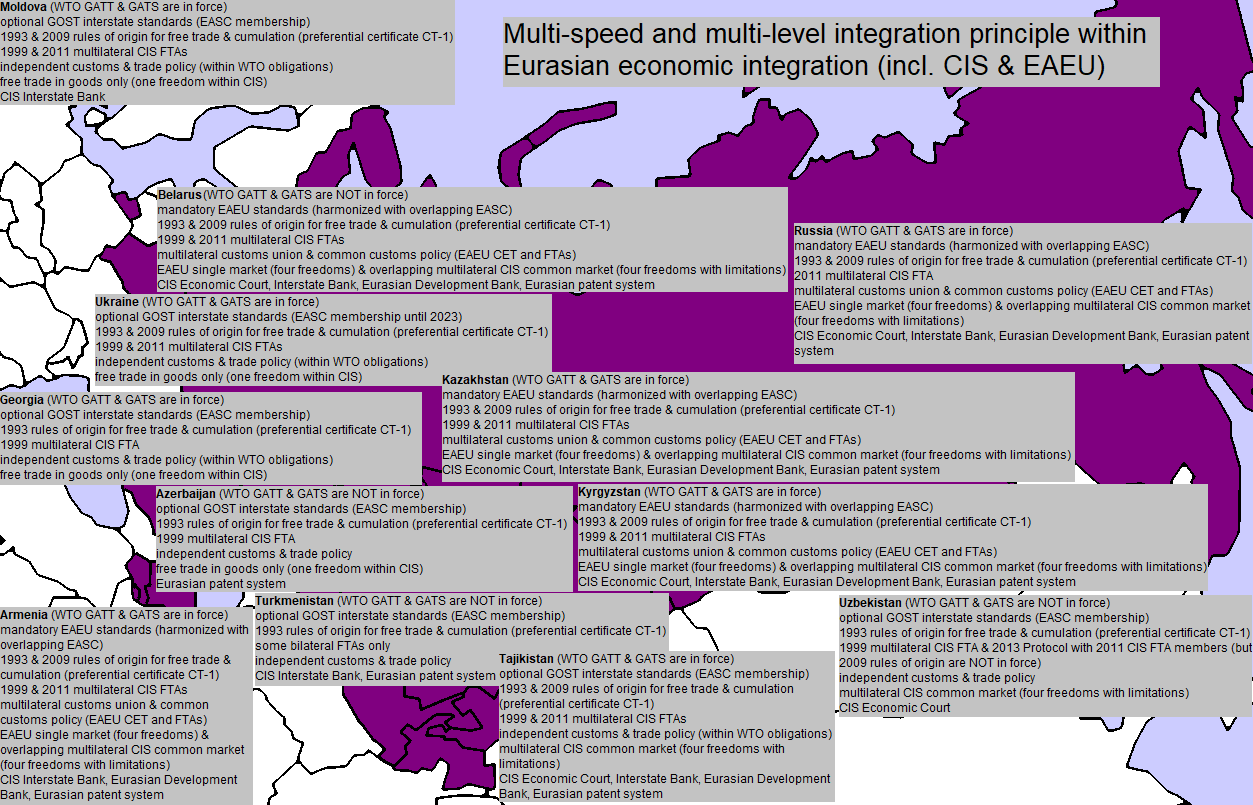
Participation in agreements and stages of economic integration of post-Soviet states within the common market of CIS and EAEU. The principles of voluntary step-by-step multi-speed and multi-level integration are envisaged in the adopted multilateral documents.

The countries of the Commonwealth of Independent States have concluded a number of agreements among themselves in the field of citizens' mobility rights, which regulate visa-free travel, recognition of documents, cooperation in the field of employment and the common labor market.

== Background ==
According to the Article 5 of Belavezha Accords, the High Contracting Parties shall recognize and respect each other's territorial integrity and the inviolability of existing borders within the Commonwealth. They shall guarantee the openness of borders, freedom of movement of citizens and freedom of information within the Commonwealth. According to Article 7, the High Contracting Parties indicate that through common coordinating institutions, their joint activities will consist in coordinating foreign policy activities, cooperation in the formation and development of a common economic space, common European and Eurasian markets, in the field of customs policy, in the development of transport and communication systems, cooperation in the field of environmental protection, migration policy and the fight against organized crime.

The Eurasian Economic Union overlaps with the Commonwealth of Independent States.

== Agreements and treaties ==
=== 1990s ===
In Bishkek on 9 October 1992, Armenia, Belarus, Kazakhstan, Kyrgyzstan, Moldova, Russia, Tajikistan, Turkmenistan, Uzbekistan concluded the Agreement on visa-free movement of citizens of the Commonwealth of Independent States within the territory of its participants. The Agreement entered into force on 9 October 1992. For Georgia, the agreement entered into force on 1 August 1997. On 21 July 1997, Azerbaijan sent notification of accession, but since Armenia did not agree to Azerbaijan's accession, the Agreement never entered into force for Azerbaijan. Turkmenistan withdrew in 1999. Russia withdrew in 2000. Kazakhstan and Uzbekistan withdrew in 2001. In particular, the document is in force for Georgia as of 2024.

Agreement on mutual recognition of visas of the participant states of the Commonwealth of Independent States signed on 13 November 1992. Protocol on the termination of the Agreement on Mutual Recognition of Visas of the Participant States of the Commonwealth of Independent States of 13 November 1992 signed on 21 November 2014. The Agreement terminated on 13 December 2019.

Agreement on the Establishment of the Consultative Council on Labor, Employment and Social Protection of the Population of the Participating States of the Commonwealth of Independent States signed on 13 November 1992.

Convention on Legal Assistance and Legal Relations in Civil, Family and Criminal Matters (Minsk Convention) signed on 22 January 1993. As of 2025, the document is in force for Azerbaijan, Armenia, Belarus, Kazakhstan, Kyrgyzstan, Moldova, Russia, Tajikistan, Turkmenistan, Uzbekistan and Georgia. Ukraine sent a notice of withdrawal on 29 December 2022 and the document ceased to be in force for Ukraine on 19 May 2024.

Agreement on assistance to refugees and internally displaced persons signed on 24 September 1993.

Agreement on cooperation in the field of labor migration and social protection of migrant workers signed on 15 April 1994. In particular, the document is in force for Ukraine as of 2024.

Convention of the Commonwealth of Independent States on Human Rights and Fundamental Freedoms signed on 26 May 1995.

Agreement on Cooperation for the Formation of a Single (Common) Educational Space of the Commonwealth of Independent States signed on 17 January 1997.

Agreement on the provision of medical assistance to citizens of the participant states of the Commonwealth of Independent States signed on 27 March 1997. In particular, the document is in force for Ukraine as of 2024.

=== 2000s ===
Convention on legal assistance and legal relations in civil, family and criminal cases (Chișinău Convention) signed on 7 October 2002 by Azerbaijan, Armenia, Belarus, Kazakhstan, Kyrgyzstan, Moldova, Russia, Tajikistan, Uzbekistan, Ukraine and Georgia. As of 2025, the document is in force for Azerbaijan, Armenia, Belarus, Kazakhstan, Kyrgyzstan, Russia, Tajikistan and Uzbekistan.

Agreement on mutual recognition and equivalence of documents on secondary (general) education, primary vocational and secondary vocational (specialized) education signed on 15 September 2004.

Decision on the Concept of Cooperation of the Participating States of the Commonwealth of Independent States in Combating Illegal Migration signed on 16 September 2004.

Agreement on cooperation in the field of professional development and retraining of specialists of the participant states of the Commonwealth of Independent States signed on 25 May 2007.

Convention on cross-border cooperation of the participant states of the Commonwealth of Independent States signed on 10 October 2008.

Convention on the Legal Status of Migrant Workers and Members of Their Families of the Participating States of the Commonwealth of Independent States signed on 14 November 2008. In particular, the document is in force for Ukraine as of 2024.

=== 2010s ===
The Treaty of the participant states of the Commonwealth of Independent States on the interstate search for persons was signed on 10 December 2010 by Azerbaijan, Armenia, Belarus, Kazakhstan, Kyrgyzstan, Moldova, Russia, Tajikistan and Uzbekistan. It was amended on 8 October 2024.

Agreement on the Unified System of Registration of Third Country Nationals and Stateless Persons Entering the Territories of the Participating States of the Commonwealth of Independent States signed on 18 October 2011.

Resolution on the Concept of the Common Migration Space of the CIS Participating States signed on 17 May 2012.

Decision on the Model Agreement on Readmission signed on 23 November 2012.

Agreement of the participant states of the Commonwealth of Independent States on mutual recognition of documents on higher/higher professional education signed on 31 May 2013.

=== 2020s ===
Agreement on Free Trade in Services, Establishment, Operations and Investment signed on 8 June 2023. It is partly based on the WTO General Agreement on Trade in Services and covers four modes of supply for the delivery of services in cross-border trade including the right to freely provide services on site after crossing the border with supplier present as a natural person.

== Common labor market ==
At the meeting of the CIS Council of Heads of Government held in Minsk on 28 May 2021, an agreement on cooperation in the field of promoting employment of the population of the CIS member states was signed. It is the first ever multilateral international treaty of the CIS participant states in the field of employment. The document was developed by the Advisory Council on Labor, Employment and Social Protection of the Population of the CIS participating states in accordance with the Priority Measures for the formation of a common labor market and regulation of labor migration for 2017–2020. The agreement entered into force in 2022. On 30 May 2024 at the Commonwealth Headquarters Representatives of the CIS countries discussed cooperation on the creation of a common labor market.

On 6 March 2024, representatives of Armenia, Belarus, Kazakhstan, Kyrgyzstan, Russia, Tajikistan, Uzbekistan and the CIS Executive Committee finalized the work on updating the Concept of Phased Formation of a Common Labor Market and Regulation of Labor Force Migration. On 29 November 2024, the CIS finally adopted an updated Concept for the phased formation of a common labor market and migration regulation.

== See also ==
- Regional organizations in the Post-Soviet states
- European integration
- Middle East economic integration
