= Immigration to Pakistan =

Immigration to Pakistan is the legal entry and settlement of foreign nationals in Pakistan. Immigration policy is overseen by the Interior Minister of Pakistan through the Directorate General Passports. Most immigrants are not eligible for citizenship or permanent residency, unless they are married to a Pakistani citizen or a Commonwealth citizen who has invested a minimum of PKR 5 million in the local economy.

Based on the United Nations report World Population Policies 2005, the total immigrant population in Pakistan was estimated to be 3,254,000, representing 2.1% of the national population, and ranked 13th in the world. According to the United Nations report International Migration Profiles 2002, the population of immigrants in Pakistan was little over 1 million in 1990 and around 1.4 million in 2000.

== Policies and procedures ==
Pakistan regulates immigration through a combination of federal institutions, including the Ministry of Interior, the Federal Investigation Agency (FIA), and the National Database and Registration Authority (NADRA).

In 2019, the government launched an online visa portal to simplify the application process for foreign nationals. E-immigration counters have also been installed at major airports, including Jinnah International Airport in Karachi and Allama Iqbal International Airport in Lahore, to improve monitoring and facilitate legal entry.

NADRA is responsible for registering foreigners, issuing identity cards to legal immigrants, and documenting refugees under agreements with the UNHCR. Policy changes, including visa restrictions and registration requirements, are often tied to security concerns and Pakistan's foreign relations.

== Demographics ==
As of 2009, an estimated 2.1% of the population of Pakistan had foreign origins. However, the number of immigrants in Pakistan recently grew sharply. Immigrants from South Asia make up a growing proportion of immigrants in Pakistan. The largest group of immigrants in Pakistan is Bangladeshi, followed by Afghan, Tajik, Uzbek, Turkmen, Indian, Sri Lankan, Burmese and Briton. Other expatriate communities in Pakistan are Chechens, Filipinos, Turks, Persian, Chinese, Americans, previously Bosnian refugees, and many others. Migrants from different countries of Arab World, especially Egypt, Iraq, Palestine, Syria, Lebanon, Libya, Tunisia, and Yemen, are in the thousands. Nearly all illegal migrants in Pakistan are Muslim refugees and they are either accepted or ignored by the local population. There is no political support or legislation to deport these refugees from Pakistan.

Sheikh Muhammad Feroze, the chairman of the Pakistani Bengali Action Committee, claimed that there were 200 settlements of Bengali-speaking people in Pakistan, of which 132 are in Karachi. They are found in various areas of Pakistan such as Thatta, Badin, Hyderabad, Tando Adam and Lahore.

Experts say that the migration of both Bengalis and Burmese (Rohingya) to Pakistan started in the 1980s and continued until 1998. Large scale Rohingya migration to Karachi made Karachi one of the largest population centres of Rohingyas in the world after Myanmar. The Burmese community of Karachi is spread out over 60 slums in Karachi such as the Burmi Colony in Korangi, Arakanabad, Machchar colony, Bilal colony, Ziaul Haq Colony and Godhra Camp.

Thousands of Uyghur Muslims have also migrated to the Gilgit-Baltistan region of Pakistan, some of them with links to terror groups in Xinjiang, China.

== Refugees ==
As of June 2026, approximately 777,986 registered Afghan refugees still remain in Pakistan. Their number was much higher in the past. Most reside in Khyber Pakhtunkhwa and Balochistan, Pakistan.

In addition, about 500 Somalis, 60–80 Iraqis and 20–30 Iranians were reported to be temporarily residing in cities such as Islamabad, Rawalpindi and Karachi. Nearly all of these are asylum seekers waiting to be resettled in countries of the Americas, Europe or Oceania.

== Illegal aliens ==
The Express Tribune reported in January 2012 that there were 5 million illegal aliens in Pakistan. Around 2 million were Bangladeshis, 2.5 million were Afghans and the other 0.5 million were from various other places such as Africa, Iran, Iraq and Myanmar.

Since early 2002, Pakistan's government took steps to determine the number of illegal aliens in its country. The National Alien Registration Authority (NARA) started registering illegal immigrants in January 2006. According to NARA, there were an estimated 1.8 million illegal aliens in Pakistan's commercial capital Karachi in 2007. Others believe that there may be about 3.35 million illegal aliens in Pakistan. As of January 2010, the number of illegal aliens in Karachi was estimated to be between 1.6 and 2 million.

It was reported a decade ago that thousands of citizens from Afghanistan, Bangladesh, India, Burma, Sri Lanka, Iran, Iraq, Nigeria, Somalia, Jordan, Uzbekistan, Tajikistan, Turkmenistan, Kyrgyzstan, and Azerbaijan were residing in Karachi without legal documentation. This included thousands of Muslim students from Thailand, the Philippines, Malaysia and Indonesia studying in the Pakistani madrasahs, while thousands of women from Bangladesh and Burma were working as maids and prostitutes there; most of them are illegal aliens.

According to some sources, thousands of radicals of Arab origin who entered the country illegally to fight in Afghanistan after the Soviet invasion in 1979, and later against the US-led invasion in October 2001, still remain in the country.

Although the presence of illegal aliens in Pakistan is against the law, the Government of Pakistan has not made a serious effort to deport them until January 2010 when Pakistani Interior Minister Rehman Malik asked illegal aliens to either leave or register themselves with the department concerned. This action was taken following the bomb attack and targeted killings of political activists in the city, against foreign militants operating in Pakistan.

According to NARA, in 2009 there were foreign nationals from over 76 countries, mostly from Afghanistan, Bangladesh, Tajikistan, India and Burma illegally living and working in the country as labourers involved in construction businesses and others which require unskilled manpower, whilst most of the illegal aliens are those who intend to use Pakistan as a transit country to immigrate to Western countries.

== See also ==
- Demographics of Pakistan
- Family planning in Pakistan
- Rohingya people in Pakistan
- Bengalis in Pakistan
- List of sovereign states and dependent territories by immigrant population
- Pakistani passport
