= Directorate General of Immigration & Passports =

Department of the Government of Pakistan

Agency overview
- Jurisdiction: Pakistan
- Agency executive: Muhammad Ali Randhawa, Director General
- Parent agency: Ministry of Interior
- Website: www.dgip.gov.pk

Directorate General of Immigration & Passports (or DGIP) is a department under the control of the Ministry of Interior in Pakistan. It has the mandate to deal with all the issues of Pakistani citizenship, passports and visas.
