= Pakistani passport =

Passport issued to Pakistani nationals

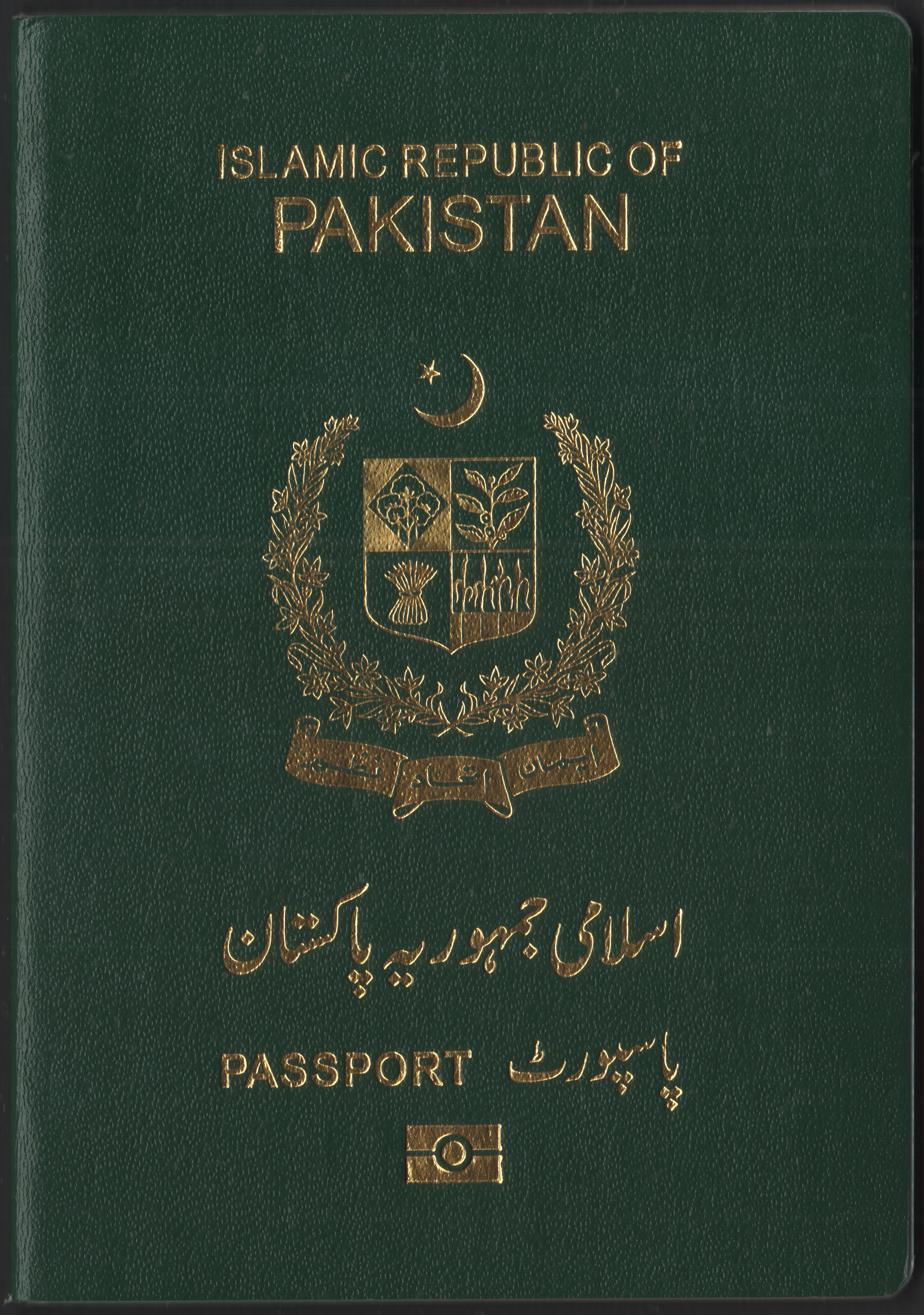
- Front cover of the current Pakistani e-passport with chip (2023)

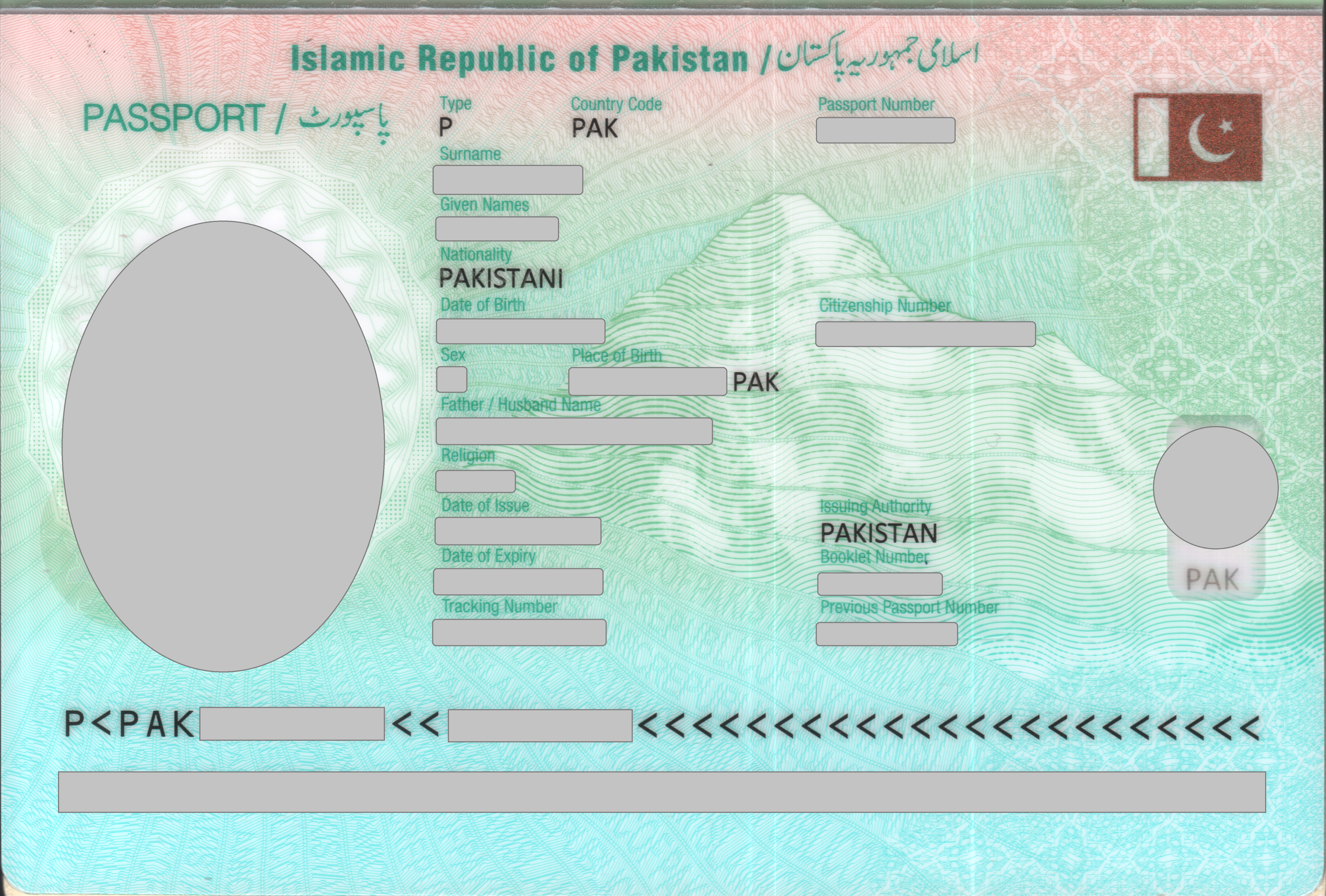
- The polycarbonate data page of the current Pakistani biometric passport
- Type: Passport
- Issued by: Directorate General of Immigration & Passports
- First issued: 1947
- Purpose: Identification, international travel
- Valid in: Every country except for Israel
- Eligibility: Pakistani citizenship
- Expiration: 5 or 10 years
- Cost: Rs. 16500 (US$59) (72 Pages); Rs. 24750 (US$89) (72 Pages)

Pakistani passports are issued to citizens of Pakistan for the purpose of international travel. The Directorate General of Immigration & Passports holds the responsibility for passport issuance, under the regulation of the Ministry of Interior.

The words "اسلامی جمہوریہ پاکستان" (Urdu for Islamic Republic of Pakistan) and "پاسپورٹ" (Urdu for passport) are inscribed on the passport, along with their English equivalents. Pakistani citizens can apply for passport issuance and renewal through regional passport offices and Pakistani embassies. Renewals can also be applied online on the DGIP website. Effective January 2014, Pakistani passports are available with either a 5-year or 10-year validity, whereas children under the age of 15 are only eligible for a 5-year validity passport. Under national law, Pakistani passports are explicitly not valid for travel to Israel. However, Pakistani travelers can visit Israel after obtaining confirmation from the Israeli Foreign Ministry.

Pakistan issues two types of passports: machine-readable passports and e-passports. Prior to 2004, Pakistani passports had handwritten bearer details and a passport photo affixed to the cover page. Since then, passports have evolved, with identity information now printed on both the front and back cover pages, which are laminated to prevent unauthorized alterations. In 2004, Pakistan began issuing machine-readable passports, but they did not initially comply with the United Nations' ICAO standards to be considered as "electronic passports" due to a lack of necessary contactless chips and symbols.

Pakistani passports are printed at the DGIP headquarters in Islamabad, the capital of the country.

On 30 March 2022, former prime minister Imran Khan launched the e-passport, which includes 29 new security features. Initially, e-passports were available only to diplomatic and government officials. Ordinary e-passport issuance was approved on 30 December 2022, with issuance commencing on 1 January 2024. In the initial production phase, these passports were exclusively available to residents of Islamabad, who could apply for them at the Directorate General of Immigration & Passports headquarters in Islamabad. Since 16 August 2023, Pakistani e-passports are accessible from any field office across the country. Pakistan's passport is ranked one of the worst in the world for global mobility.

== Types ==
The issuance of Pakistani passports is governed by the Passport Act of 1974 and the Passport and Visa Manual of 1974. The Government of Pakistan offers three distinct types of passports to its citizens:

Type	Description
Ordinary passport (Green cover)	Issued to everyday Pakistani citizens, and easily recognisable by their green outer cover. These passports have 'P', signifying 'Personal', as their passport type mentioned on their data page.
Official passport (Blue cover)	Issued to various government officials, including senators, members of the National Assembly, provincial ministers, judges of the Supreme and High courts of Pakistan, as well as government officers on official overseas assignments. They are identifiable by their blue cover and are categorized as 'S', representing 'Service' as their passport type on the data page.
Diplomatic passport (Red cover)	Issued by the Ministry of Foreign Affairs to diplomats and other eligible categories. They are easily identifiable by their distinctive red outer cover and are labelled with 'D' for 'Diplomatic' as their passport type on the data page.

=== Biometric passports e-Passports ===
In 2022, Pakistan introduced state-of-the-art biometric passports, often referred to as "e-passports." (or Biometric passport). These advanced travel documents include an embedded electronic chip on the data page, which is the first page of the passport and crafted from polycarbonate. This chip is specifically engineered to protect biometric data, ensuring the reliable verification of the passport holder's identity. Inside the chip, you can find the passport holder's image, biometric information, personal details from the data page, a distinct identification number, and a digital signature.

These e-passports also incorporate a contactless (NFC) chip, allowing for electronic readability. Pakistani citizens can conveniently use e-gates located at various international airports for streamlined travel. Notably, these recently introduced Pakistani e-passports are fully compliant with the United Nations' ICAO standards.

=== Machine-readable passports ===
Pakistan started issuing machine-readable passports (MRPs) in 2004. These MRPs were introduced to enhance security features and comply with international standards for travel documents. Machine-readable passports contain a machine-readable zone, biographic information and a digitized photograph of the passport holder, which can be scanned and read electronically at border control and immigration checkpoints.

=== Discontinued passports ===
- Before the introduction of machine-readable passports (MRPs) in Pakistan, Pakistan issued manual or traditional passports. These passports were hand-written and were not equipped with the electronic features and biometric data. Manual passports typically contained the passport holder's personal information, a glued photograph, and various stamps.
- In the past, Pakistan used to provide a distinct Hajj passport exclusively for Pakistani nationals embarking on Hajj, the Islamic pilgrimage to Mecca, Saudi Arabia. However, these specialized Hajj passports are no longer in circulation, and regular Pakistani passports are now acceptable for this purpose.
- Prior to achieving independence, individuals from the region utilized British Indian Passports for their travel documentation.

== Security features ==
The key security features of the Pakistani MRP are:

- PKI – Public Key Infrastructure
- Biometrics, namely facial and fingerprint
- IPI – Invisible Personal ID
- 2D Barcode
- Machine-readable zone (MRZ)
- Security substrate and laminate
- Ultraviolet-feature microprinting
- Holograms
- Watermark paper
- Security ink
- 3-colour intaglio printing
- Guilloché patterns

The Pakistani e-passport incorporates not only all the security elements of the MRP but also boasts an additional 29 advanced security features, including: a contactless electronic chip, offset microtext, deliberate errors, relief printing, rainbow printing, Differactive Optically Variable Image Device, UV Printing, Raster Printing, Multiple Laser Image, Modulated microtext, and 3D Design Relief.

== Physical appearance ==
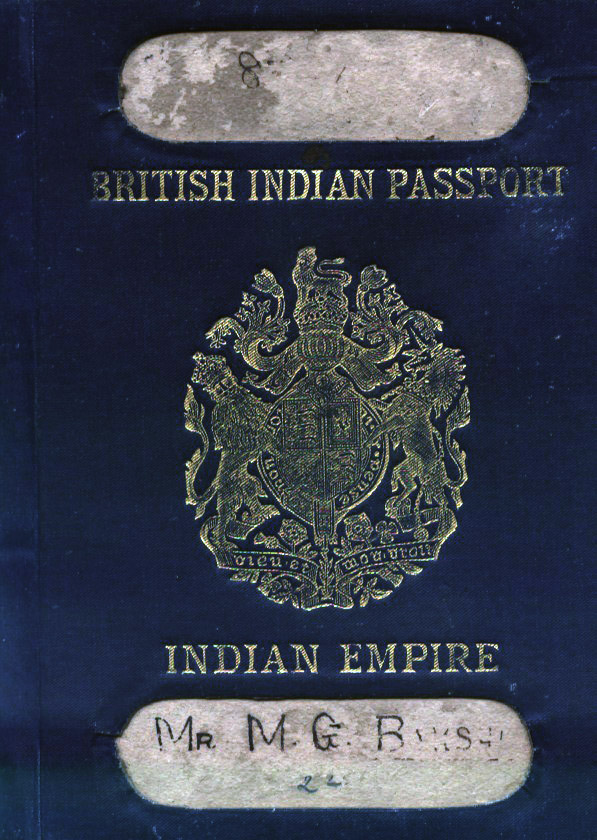
British India passport, used when Pakistan was a part of British India.

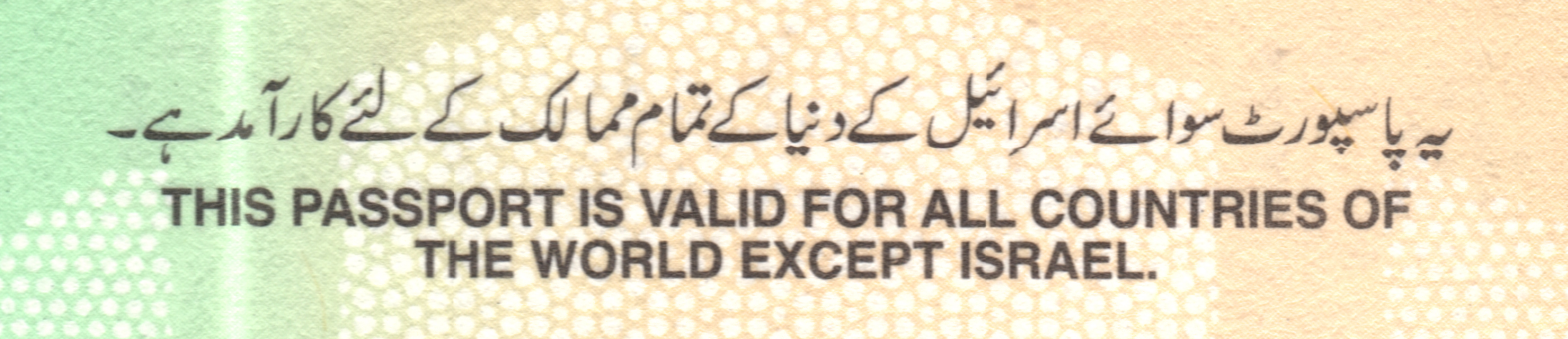
Pakistani passports contain a note that the passport cannot be used for travel to Israel

Ordinary Pakistani passports are characterized by their rich green covers adorned with golden insignia. Prominently displayed at the center of the front cover is the State Emblem of Pakistan. Above the emblem, the words 'Islamic Republic of Pakistan' are elegantly inscribed in English, while below the emblem, one will find the Urdu script اسلامی جمہوریہ پاکستان along with 'پاسپورٹ,' and the term 'Passport' in English. The outer cover of Pakistani machine-readable passports features the State Emblem of Pakistan enclosed within a golden oval. In contrast, the Pakistani e-passport offers a more streamlined and modern appearance by eliminating the oval. The Pakistani e-passport also contains the chip inside symbol.

The standard Pakistani passport is composed of 36 pages, but for frequent travellers, there is the option to obtain passports with 72 or 100 pages.

=== Physical appearance of a Pakistani e-passport ===
- The opening cover end is titled "INSTRUCTIONS". This page contains signature/thumb impression of the holder, and a note that reads:

This Passport contains a chip and antenna embedded in Data Page. For best performance please do not bend, perforate or expose to excessive temperature and moisture

The passport cover page contains the following instructions above the note:

  1. The Passport is the property of the Government of Pakistan and may be withdrawn at any time.
  2. The possession of this Passport doesn't exempt passport holder from having to comply with the rules and regulations of any country or from having to obtain a visa when required.
  3. In case of loss of Passport it must be reported to the nearest Passport Office and to the nearest Police Station in Pakistan or to the nearest Pakistan Mission in case of abroad. If the holder recovers the possession of lost Passport after reporting loss it must be reported within 14 days. Travel on reported lost Passport is prohibited.
  4. Any person involved in alteration / tampering in the Passport would be liable to punishment under the law. Moreover, the person carrying a Passport unauthorizedly which belongs to some other person falls in same violation.
  5. Dispatch of Passport abroad or recall to Pakistan from abroad through courier without permission from Directorate General Immigration & Passports, is prohibited.
  6. Pakistani citizens living abroad more than three months, as per Pakistani Citizenship Rules 1952, must register their names annually in the nearest Pakistan Mission for contact in case of emergency. Change of address or leaving the country may also be reported to Pakistan Mission or Consulate. Birth of child must also be reported to the nearest Pakistan Mission to get support / guidance.
- The initial page of the Pakistani e-passport is composed of polycarbonate, housing the embedded contactless chip along with its antenna(s). On one side of this polycarbonate leaf, one will find The words "Government of Pakistan" (written in both: Urdu and English), the State Emblem of Pakistan and the passport note from the President of Pakistan (mentioned later). The other side of the polycarbonate leaf is the data page, which consists of:
  - The text "Islamic Republic of Pakistan / اسلامی جمہوریہ پاکستان"
  - The text "Passport / پاسپورٹ" written above the picture of the passport holder
  - Photo of passport holder
  - Type (either 'D', 'P,' or 'S')
  - Country Code (PAK)
  - Passport Number
  - Surname
  - Given Names
  - Nationality (PAKISTANI)
  - Date of Birth
  - Citizenship Number
  - Sex
  - Place of Birth
  - Father / Husband Name
  - Religion
  - Date of Issue
  - Issuing Authority
  - Picture of holder with words "PAK" written below
  - Date of Expiry
  - Booklet Number
  - Tracking Number
  - Previous Passport Number (if any)
  - Machine-readable zone
- The second page (first paper page, numbered as "1") contains the note declaring that the passport is invalid for travel to Israel, right above the words "ANNOTATIONS". This page further contains the booklet number.
- Page number 2 is reserved for observations.
- Pages after the observation are for visa and entry/exit stamps.
- The concluding section of the passport includes details related to regulations and registration.

=== Physical appearance of a Pakistani machine-readable passport ===
- The opening cover end contains the following information:
  - The text "ISLAMIC REPUBLIC OF PAKISTAN" on the top left corner
  - The text "PASSPORT" on top of the passport holder's photo
  - Photo of passport holder
  - Type (either 'D', 'P,' or 'S')
  - Country Code (PAK)
  - Passport Number
  - Surname
  - Given Names
  - Nationality (PAKISTANI)
  - Date of Birth
  - Citizenship Number
  - Sex
  - Place of Birth
  - Father/Husband Name
  - Date of Issue
  - Issuing Authority
  - Date of Expiry
  - Tracking Number
  - Booklet Number
  - Machine-readable zone
- First page of a regular booklet contains:
  - State Emblem of Pakistan
  - Passport Note from the Ministry of Interior of Pakistan, in the name of President of Pakistan (mentioned later)
  - Booklet number
- Second page is titled "ANNOTATIONS" on the top and contains the following information:
  - Religion
  - Previous passport number (if any)
  - Signature of the passport holder
  - A notation in both English and Urdu indicating that the passport remains invalid in the absence of the holder's signature or thumb impression
- Third page declares that the passport is valid to travel to all countries of the world except Israel.
- Fourth and fifth pages are reserved for observations.
- Pages from sixth page and onward are for visa and entry/exit stamps.
- The information on the inside back cover of a Pakistani passport states in Urdu only:
  - ضوابط
    - ۱- یہ پاسپورٹ حکومت پاکستان کی ملکیت ہے - بیرونی ممالک میں رائج امیگریشن ضوابط کی پابندی ہر حامل پاسپورٹ پر لازم ہوگی جن ممالک میں داخلے کے لئے ویزا حاصل کرنا ضروری ہو وہاں جانے سے پہلے ویزا حاصل کرنا چاہیے ۔ ۳- منسوخ شده یا زائدالمیعاد پاسپورٹ دوسال تک لے پاسپورٹ کے ساتھ رکھنا چاہئے کیونکہ زرمبادلہ کے لئے درخواست دیتے وقت شخص متعلقہ کو اس کی ضرورت پڑے گی ۔ گر پاسپورٹ کم یا ضائع ہو جاۓ تو پولیس اور پاکستان کے پاسپورٹ جاری کرنے والے قریب ترین دفترمیں فورا اطلاع کرنی چاہئے ۔ بیرونی ممالک میں ایسی اطلاع قریب ترین پاکستانی سفارت خانہ یا قونصل خانہ کو دی جائے ۔ ۵ - پاسپورٹ میں تبدیلی یا اضافہ وغیرہ صرف مجاز عہد یدار کرسکتا ہے ۔ قانون کی رو سے ایسے اشخاص موجب سزا قرار دیئے جا سکتے ہیں جو پاسپورٹ میں کسی قسم کی تبدیلی یا ردو بدل کر میں نیز ایسے لوگ بھی سزا کے مستحق ہیں جن کے قبضے میں ناجائز طور پر ایسا پاسپورٹ ہو جو انھیں قانونی طورسے نہ دیا گیا ہو ۔ ملک سے بذریعہ ڈاک یا کسی اور طریقے سے پاسپورٹ کسی دوسرے ملک بھیجنا قانونا جرم ہے ۔
  - رجسٹریشن
    - بیرونی ممالک میں تین ماہ سے زیادہ قیام کرنے والے پاکستانی شہریوں پر لازم ہے کہ وہ قواعد شہرت پاکستان ۱۹۵۲ ء کے تحت ہر سال اپنا نام قریب ترین پاکستانی سفارت خانہ یا قونصل خانہ میں رجسٹر کرا لیا کریں پتہ کی تبدیلی اور ملک سے روانگی کی اطلاع سفارت خانہ یا قونصل خانہ کو دینی ضروری ہے ۔ نیز یہ کہ اگر بیرون ملک پاکستانی شہری کے کوئی بچہ پیدا ہو تو اس کا نام بھی قریب ترین پاکستانی سفارت خانہ یا قونصل خانہ میں مندرجہ بالا قواعد کے تحت رجسٹر کرائیں تاکہ بوقت ضرورت انھیں سفارت خانہ کی امداد اور مشورہ حاصل ہوسکے ۔
- English Translation (not present on the actual passport):
  - Regulations:
    - This passport is owned by the Government of Pakistan.
    - Compliance with the existing immigration regulations in foreign countries will be mandatory on every passport holder. One must obtain a visa before entering the countries for which it is necessary to obtain a visa.
    - Revoked or overdue passport should be kept with the passport for up to two years as the person concerned will need it while applying for foreign exchange.
    - If the passport is lost or wasted, the police and the nearest Pakistani passport issuing office should be notified immediately. Such information should be given to the nearest Pakistani embassy or consulate in foreign countries.
    - Only authorized officer can change or add to the passport. According to the law, persons can be punished according to the change or alteration of their passport, as well as those who have a passport in their possession which is not given to them legally.
    - It is a criminal offence to send a passport from one country to another by mail or otherwise.
  - Registration:
    - Pakistani citizens residing in foreign countries for more than three months are required to register their name at the nearest Pakistani embassy or consulate every year under the Pakistan Rules of Reputation 1952. Change of address and departure from the country information must be given to the embassy or consulate. Also, if any child of a Pakistani citizen is born abroad, his name should be registered in the nearest Pakistani embassy or consulate under the above rules so that he can get the help and advice of the embassy in case of need.

=== Passport note ===
Within Pakistani passports, there is a formal statement from the President of Pakistan, directing the officials of all nations to recognize the bearer as a citizen of the Islamic Republic of Pakistan. This statement also urges and obliges that the bearer be granted unhindered passage, assistance, and protection in times of need. The internal note found within Pakistani e-passports reads as follows:

The President of Islamic Republic of Pakistan requires and requests all those whom it may concern to allow the citizen of Pakistan named in this travel document to pass freely without delay or hindrance and to afford such assistance and protection as may be necessary

While the internal note found within Pakistani machine-readable passports reads as follows:

Ministry of Interior, Government of Pakistan requires & requests in the name of President of Islamic Republic of Pakistan all those to whom it may concern to allow the bearer to pass freely without let or hindrance and to afford the bearer such assistance and protection as may be necessary.

Director General Immigration & Passports.

== Visa requirements ==
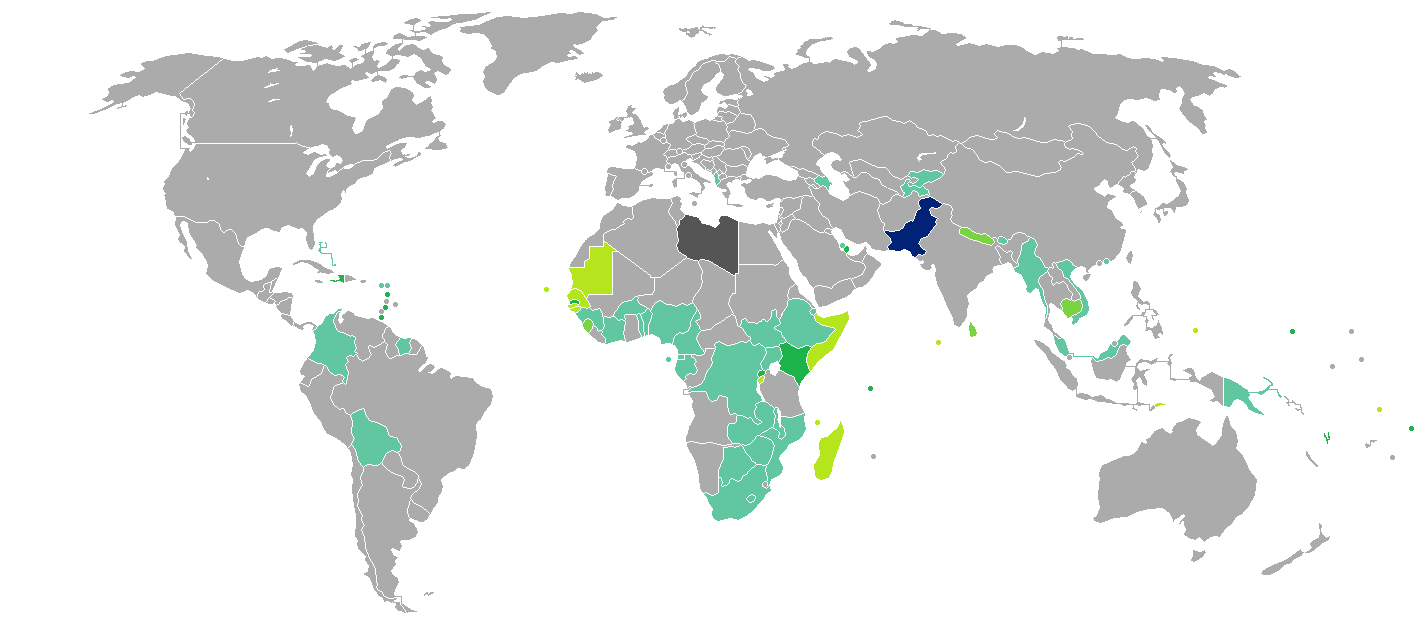
Visa requirements for holders of regular Pakistani passports Islamic Republic of Pakistan Visa free access Visa issued upon arrival Electronic authorisation or eVisa required Visa available both on arrival or online Visa required prior to arrival

As of July 2024, Henley Passport Index ranks the Pakistani passport at 100th place, with visa-free or visa on arrival access to 34 nations and territories to Pakistani citizens. As of August 2022, The Passport Index ranked the Pakistani passport 86th, with visa-free or visa on arrival access to 43 nations (based on visa-free or visa on arrival access to nations or territories). Pakistan was ranked 94th in passport strength, which is shared with Somalia. Below Pakistan were Syria (ranked 96) and Afghanistan (ranked 77). It remains one of the lowest-ranked passports in the world.

== Issue delays ==
The Pakistani passport delay, ongoing since February 2024, has significantly impacted thousands of citizens worldwide. A combination of factors, including government funding delays for new passport printing machines, technical difficulties, and bureaucratic obstacles, has contributed to the backlog of over 800,000 passport applications. This delay has disrupted travel plans, hindered economic activities, and caused inconvenience for many Pakistanis, both domestically and abroad. In response, the government has implemented measures to clear the backlog, including expediting urgent passport applications and utilizing embassies to process cases more efficiently.

== See also ==
- Pakistani national identity card
- Visa requirements for Pakistani citizens
- Visa policy of Pakistan
- Pakistani nationality law
- Immigration to Pakistan
- List of passports
