= Visa requirements for Pakistani citizens =

Entry restrictions by the authorities of other states placed on citizens of Pakistan

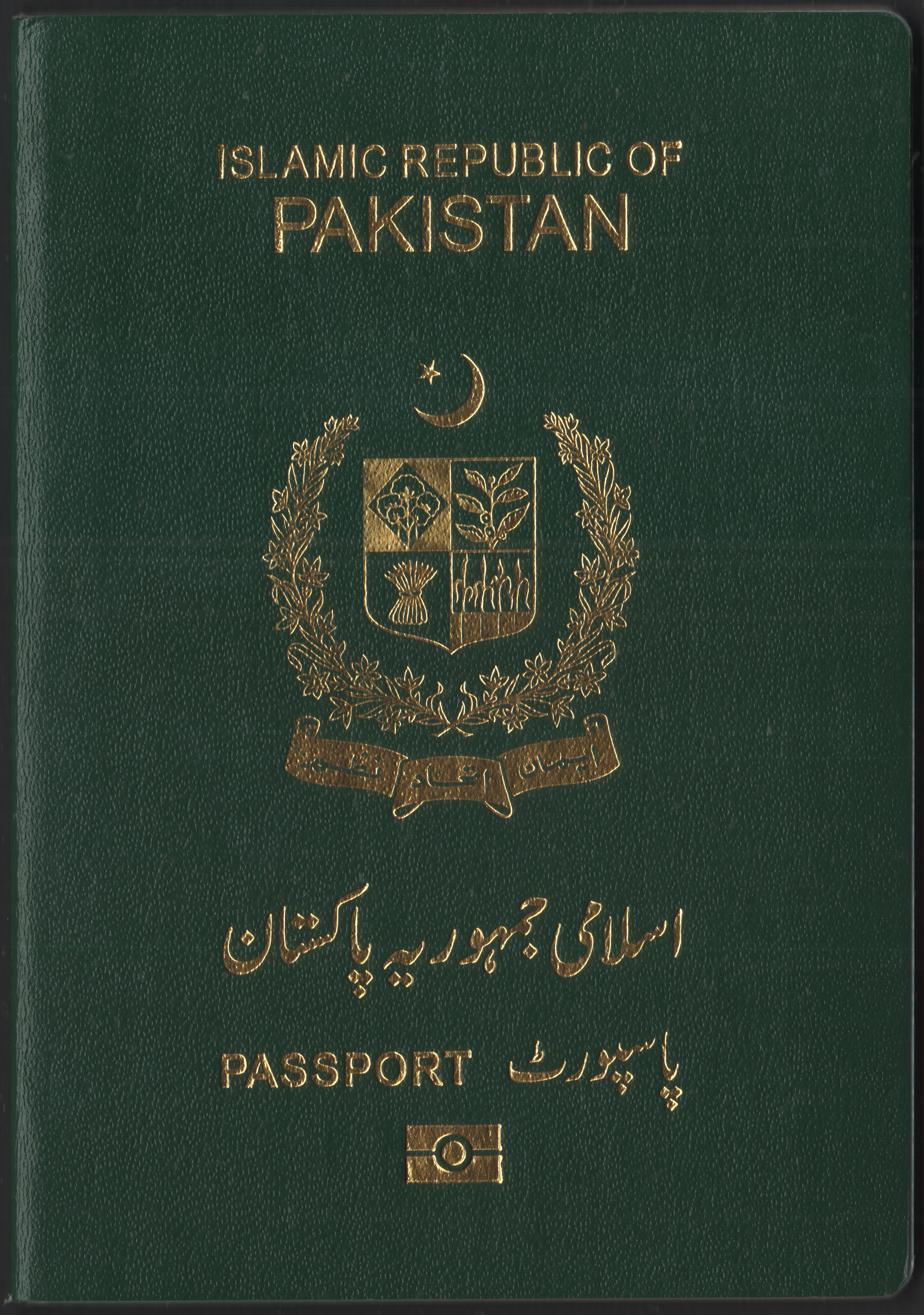
Pakistani passport

Visa requirements for Pakistani citizens are the requirements by other countries to obtain a visa before entry on an ordinary Pakistani Passport.

As of 2026, Pakistani citizens have visa-free or visa on arrival access to 30 countries and territories, ranking the Pakistani passport 100th in the world according to the Henley Passport Index.

All of the updated links and visa-related requirements can be found listed in the chart below. Pakistani passport holders that hold multi-entry visas or permanent residency permits in certain European countries, Canada, USA, GCC states or Australia (for example) may grant the ability to apply for e-Visas to certain nations, as well as Visa on Arrival access that they would not have without visas to these nations.

== Visa requirements map ==
Visa requirements for Pakistani citizens holding ordinary passports Islamic Republic of Pakistan Visa not required Visa on arrival eVisa Visa available both on arrival or online Visa required prior to arrival Invitation or permission required Entry restrictions

== Visa requirements ==
The chart below outlines the visa requirements for Pakistani Ordinary passport holders. e-Visa or Online visa indicates that a visa may be granted online electronic visas universally to all applicants who are accepted, without needing to attend an interview or Embassy to collect the visa before travel.

The information is collected using the instructions on official Embassy / Consulate websites, Ministry of Foreign Affairs of these nations, as well as data from the International Air Transport Association (IATA) Timatic database containing documentation requirements for passengers traveling internationally via air, e.g. passport and visa requirements. It is important that all travelers double-check with the references, secondary sources and/or their airline before departing on a journey for additional requirements.

Country	Visa requirement	Allowed stay	Notes (excluding departure fees)
Afghanistan	Visa required		Not eligible for the e-Visa program available to most nationalities.
Albania	eVisa	90 days	Visa not required for passengers with a valid multiple entry Schengen visa, or residency permit with the condition that the visa must have been used previously in one of the countries of the Schengen area.; Visa not required for passengers with a valid 10-year UAE residence permit or holders of a multiple entry visa or residency permit for the United States or the United Kingdom.
Algeria	Visa required		Persons may be denied entry if entering with a passport containing visas or stamps issued by Israel.; Visitors on tours organized to some southern regions by an approved travel agency may obtain a visa on arrival for up to 30 days.
Andorra	Visa required		Andorra has no international airport and can only be accessed via land border with France or Spain. You will need a Valid passport with two or multiple-entry Schengen visas in order to enter, as lawful re-entry via land France or Spain is required. https://visitandorra.com/en/visitor-information/before-you-arrive/passport-visas-customs/
Angola	eVisa	30 days	30 days per trip, but no more than 90 days within any 1 calendar year for tourism purposes only.; Visitors must have a return/onward ticket and a hotel reservation confirmation.; An International Certificate of Vaccination is required.
Antigua and Barbuda	eVisa		30 day Visa on arrival (100 USD) if holding valid visa Schengen Visa or residency.; 30 day Visa on arrival (100 USD) if holding valid visa or Permanent residency to UK, US or Canada.
Argentina	Visa required		
Armenia	Invitation required		Visas are granted by invitation only by the authorities, foreign diplomatic representations, international organizations, or their representatives accredited in the Republic of Armenia.; Nationals of Pakistan who hold a valid residence permit issued by the US, EU state, Schengen Area States, any of the six GCC countries, and whose residence permit is valid for at least six months from the date of entry into the Republic of Armenia, are exempt from the visa requirement starting from January 1 to July 1, 2026. They can stay in the territory of the Republic of Armenia without a visa for up to 180 days within a one-year period (they must carry the physical card having key information in Latin script).
Australia	Visa required		Online visa available using the tourist stream under Visa class: Visitor-600 can be obtained online for 150.00 AUD at https://online.immi.gov.au/lusc/login; After applying some applicants, depending on the information that they input, MAY be asked to submit their biometrics as an additional requirement to the nearest embassy, consulate or authorized processing center or be asked to submit further information before their visa is available for download.; Visa granted can be for a time of 3, 6 or 12 months.
Austria	Visa required		
Azerbaijan	eVisa	30 days	Passengers with a residence permit issued by the United Arab Emirates can obtain a visa upon arrival for a maximum of 30 days (provided the passport is valid for at least 123 days, and the residence permit for at least 183 days).
Bahamas	eVisa	3 months	
Bahrain	eVisa / Visa on arrival	14 days	
Bangladesh	Visa required		Visa application can be completed online and submitted to the nearest Bangladeshi Embassy https://www.visa.gov.bd/; Polio vaccine required; Visa on arrival (30 days) may be available to Pakistani Nationals who are residents of countries that do not have a Bangladesh diplomatic/consular mission.
Barbados	Visa not required	90 days	
Belarus	Visa required		30 day visa-free access for holders of a valid multi-entry EU or Schengen visa. https://www.belarus.by/rel_image/6400
Belgium	Visa required		
Belize	Visa required		Visa-free entry for Permanent residents and holders of multiple entry visa to USA and Canada.; Visa-free entry for visa holders of a Schengen Member State 90 days.
Benin	eVisa	30 days	Must have an international vaccination certificate.; Three types of electronic visa are offered: the e-Visa valid for 30 days for a single entry (50 EUR), the e-Visa valid for 30 days for several (multiple) entries (75 EUR), and the e-Visa valid for 90 days to make several (multiple) entries (100 EUR).
Bhutan	eVisa	90 days	The Sustainable Development Fee (SDF) of 200 USD per person, per night for almost all visitors to Bhutan. Additionally, if payment is made in US dollars from September 1, 2023 to August 31, 2027, the SDF is 100 USD.
Bolivia	Online Visa		Yellow fever vaccination certificate required.; Criminal and/or police record, issued by the competent authority in the country of origin or last residence required
Bosnia and Herzegovina	Visa required		Visa not required if holding two or multiple entry short-stay visa or residence permit issued by a Schengen member or EU state for stays that are of no more than 90 days.
Botswana	eVisa	3 month	Both Single entry and Multi entry eVisa (3 months) available online.
Brazil	Visa required		
Brunei	Visa required		Polio vaccination certification required.
Bulgaria	Visa required		Visa not required if holding two or multiple entry short-stay visa issued by a Schengen member state for stays that of no more than 90 days.
Burkina Faso	Visa required		Transit through Burkina Faso, for less than 24 hours, does not need a transit visa if they are continuing their journey by the same or first connecting aircraft and they do not leave the airport.; Yellow fever vaccination required.
Burundi	Online Visa / Visa on arrival	1 month	The Burundi Embassy in USA announced that as of 2021, nationals of all countries receive visa on arrival at Burundi International Airport and all land borders.; Yellow fever vaccine certificate required; Pakistani nationals can apply for a visa in advance at the Burundi consulate in Doha, Dubai or the nearest embassy.
Cambodia	eVisa / Visa on arrival	30 days	Visa on arrival at border checkpoints not supported by eVisa
Cameroon	eVisa		
Canada	Visa required		Visa on arrival for United States Permanent residence (Green card) holders.; All visitors to Canada must submit Electronic Travel Authorization (eTA) when entering Canada via air.
Cape Verde	Visa required		
Central African Republic	Visa required		
Chad	eVisa		
Chile	Visa required		
China	Visa required		24-hour visa-free transit through any international airports of China (except Ürümqi), allows domestic travel through different airports. (Note: Custom procedure for 24-hour visa-free transit is required in principle, except in Beijing (both Capital and Daxing), Shanghai Pudong, Hangzhou, Xiamen, Guangzhou, Shenzhen, Chengdu Tianfu and Xi'an if no leaving of international transit areas.); Pakistani nationals who wish to travel to China as a tourist (Type L visa) are requested to join a tourist group (more than 5 people), which should be arranged through an authorized Chinese travel agency with an invitation letter.
Colombia	Online Visa		All visitors require ETA "Check Mig" form must be submitted at most 72 hours before departure, as well as within 72 hours of exiting Columbia (Exit visa). https://apps.migracioncolombia.gov.co/pre-registro/public/preregistro.jsf .
Comoros	Visa on arrival	45 days	Visa on Arrival fee is 50 USD.
Costa Rica	Visa required		30 day Visa-free access for Permanent residents or Multi entry visa holders to United States or Canada.; 30 day Visa-free access for Permanent residents, Students or those in possession of a work visa from EU countries, United Kingdom, Switzerland, Norway or Iceland.
Côte d'Ivoire	eVisa	3 months	e-Visa holders must arrive via Félix-Houphouët-Boigny International Airport.; Yellow fever vaccine certificate required
Croatia	Visa required		Visa-free entry for holders of a valid multi-entry visa or residence permit of Bulgaria, Cyprus or Romania.
Cuba	eVisa	90 days	Visitors require an Advanced travel information form (D'VIAJEROS) at https://dviajeros.mitrans.gob.cu/inicio, 48 hours before entry into Cuba.; Medical travel insurance required.
Cyprus	Visa required		Visa not required if holding two or multiple entry short-stay visa issued by a Schengen member state for stays that of no more than 90 days.; Visas will NOT be granted to travelers with evidence of past travel (Visa stamps) to the Turkish Republic of Northern Cyprus, or if their itineraries include illegal entries from ports and airports.
Czech Republic	Visa required		
Denmark	Visa required		
Democratic Republic of the Congo	eVisa	7 days	Vaccination against yellow fever required.
Djibouti	eVisa	90 days	Transit visa is not required if you do not leave the airport.
Dominica	Visa not required	6 months	
Dominican Republic	Visa required		Passengers and airline crew who have been in or transited through Equatorial Guinea on or after 8 February 2023 are not allowed to enter due to the Marburg virus; All travelers who wish to enter must submit an E-Ticket at https://eticket.migracion.gob.do/, when they enter/exit and present the QR code at immigration.; A Yellow fever vaccination certificate is required.; Visa not required if holding valid visa issued by an EU member state, Canada or the US for stays that of no more than 90 days.
Ecuador	Online Visa		Yellow fever vaccination certificate required.
Egypt	Visa required		Visa on arrival (30 days) for passengers with a valid and used visa issued by Australia, Canada, Japan, New Zealand, USA, United Kingdom or a Schengen Member State.; Passengers with a residence permit issued by the United Arab Emirates can obtain a visa upon arrival for a maximum of 30 days. The residence permit must be valid for a minimum of 6 months from the arrival date. They must have a confirmed return ticket and sufficient funds to cover their stay.; A "Courtesy visa" on arrival may be available to wives of Egyptian nationals, however, this is subject to approval by the immigration authorities and is not guaranteed. It is highly recommended to obtain a visa or confirmation before embarking.
El Salvador	Visa required		
Equatorial Guinea	eVisa		Proof of vaccination for Yellow fever is required.
Eritrea	Visa required		
Estonia	Visa required		
Eswatini	Visa required		
Ethiopia	eVisa	90 days	e-Visa is valid for a period of 30 or 90 days. Visa can be extended after arriving.
Fiji	Online Visa		
Finland	Visa required		
France	Visa required		
Gabon	eVisa	90 days	e-Visas are valid only for those entering Gabon by air via Leon Mba International Airport in Libreville.; Visitors are required to hold a hotel voucher or letter of invitation issued by the sponsor.
Gambia	Visa not required	90 days	Yellow Fever Vaccination certificate required.
Georgia	eVisa		Visa not required for holders of a valid visa or residence permit to Schengen, any of the OECD member countries, GCC country, Japan or South Korea. For a full list of countries visit; Travel medical insurance is required.; For those not eligible for visa exemption or e-Visa, can submit visa application online at https://www.geoconsul.gov.ge/en/register/visit . and schedule your appointment with the nearest embassy or consulate to process your visa.; Transit visa not required.
Germany	Visa required		
Ghana	Visa required		Visa applications for Pakistanis are processed in the Ghana mission in Iran. Applications can be started online at https://tehran.ghanagovernmentmission.com/portal/ and passport is to be submitted to the visa processing center in Islamabad or Teiran.; Health declaration form required 3 days prior to travel https://www.ghs-hdf.org/; Yellow fever vaccine certificate required.
Greece	Visa required		Visas will not be granted to travelers with evidence of past travel (Visa stamps) to the Turkish Republic of Northern Cyprus.
Grenada	Visa required		
Guatemala	Visa required		Visa not required for those who hold Permanent residence in the United States.
Guinea	eVisa	90 days	Yellow fever vaccine certificate required.
Guinea-Bissau	Visa on arrival	90 days	Visa on arrival (90 days) may be available, however prior arrangements and an authorization letter from the Migration Office of Guinea Bissau is required.; Yellow fever vaccine certificate required.
Guyana	eVisa		
Haiti	Visa not required	3 months	10 USD Tourist fee to be collected upon arrival at the Airport.
Honduras	Visa required		Visa not required for those who hold Permanent residence or multi-entry visa to USA, Canada or Schengen area.; Travelers to Honduras are required to sign up for "Pre-check" at https://prechequeo.inm.gob.hn/Login before they arrive.; All travelers are required to complete travelers declaration before entering and leaving the country (Exit visa) at https://sisglobal.aduanas.gob.hn/Pech/#/plataforma/otra_gestiones/formularioDJRV
Hungary	Visa required		
Iceland	Visa required		
India	Permission required		There are NO Tourist visas for Pakistanis.; Due to high political tensions, there are extra requirements, a limited amount of purposes that entry can be granted and scrutiny Pakistani/Pakistani origin applicants go through while applying. The Visa process for Pakistani/Pakistan origin nationals is a 100 percent prior reference process and prior clearance from the Ministry of Home Affairs of India is mandatory.; Pakistani nationals with dual nationality must ONLY apply on their Pakistani passport.; People of Pakistani origin, Spouses of Pakistanis or whose parents or grandparents have held a Pakistani passport in the past must submit a copy of a Pakistan Overseas Card (NICOP) or a Citizenship Renunciation Letter issued by the Ministry of Interior of Pakistan.; Polio vaccine certificate is required.
Indonesia	eVisa	60 days	All travelers must fill out a customs declaration at https://ecd.beacukai.go.id/; Passengers must download the COVID-19 "Satusehat app" for health clearance.
Iran	Visa Required		Pakistanis wishing to visit Iran for any reason must use the eVisa system.; Electronically submitting your online application to https://evisa.mfa.ir/en/ is the FIRST STEP in the visa application process.; Pakistanis are required to choose the nearest Embassy/Consulate where they will pick up their Visa.
Iraq	eVisa	30 days	
Ireland	Visa required		Visa application is submitted online at https://www.visas.inis.gov.ie/. Applicants will be asked to attend the relevant Irish Embassy, Consulate, Visa Office, or Visa Application Centre to submit biometrics and collect their visa.; May transit without a visa.
Israel	Invitation required		Pakistan does not recognize Israel. Under Pakistani national law, Pakistani passports are explicitly invalid for travel to Israel. Pakistani Dual nationals who attempt to travel to Israel from Pakistan on a Foreign passport, without prior arrangement and permission will be stopped by the Civil Aviation Authority at the Airport.; Israel does not have diplomatic ties with Pakistan, under Israeli law nations that are considered "hostile" require special invitations by an official party or company that needs to be submitted at the Israeli Ministry of Interior.
Italy	Visa required		
Jamaica	Visa required		
Japan	Visa required		e-Visa is available at https://www.evisa.mofa.go.jp/personal/login for those who hold residence AND reside in Brazil, Cambodia, Canada, Mongolia, Saudi Arabia, Singapore, South Africa, Taiwan, United Arab Emirates, United Kingdom or United States.
Jordan	Visa required		Pakistani nationals seeking entry to Jordan for Tourism, require a sponsor for a "Visit visa"; Pakistani nationals without a sponsor can only obtain a "Tourism visa" through a Jordanian tourist agency officially registered and certified in the Ministry of Tourism.; All visa applications can be completed online at https://eservices.moi.gov.jo and receive an Electronic visa within 0-14 business days.; A visa on arrival is available for Pakistani nationals who hold at least a 6-month residency permit for Canada, Australia, the UK, South Korea, Japan, EU countries, or GCC countries.
Kazakhstan	Visa required		Invitation registered with the Ministry of Internal Affairs is required.
Kenya	Electronic Travel Authorisation	90 days	Applications can be submitted up to 90 days prior to travel and must be submitted at least 3 days in advance.; eTA fee is 32.50 USD.; Proof of reservation at the hotel where visitors plan to stay is required (if staying with friends, an invitation letter is also acceptable).; Yellow fever vaccination certificate is required if coming from endemic countries.
Kiribati	Visa required		
Kuwait	Visa required		
Kyrgyzstan	eVisa	60 days	Nationals of Pakistan with a resident permit issued by the Brunei or any of the GCC countries can obtain a visa upon arrival at Bishkek (FRU) for a maximum of 1 month if they travel as tourists.; Alternately, an e-Visa can be obtained at https://www.evisa.e-gov.kg/ (which may require an invitation letter from a Kyrgyz national).
Laos	Visa required		
Latvia	Visa required		
Lebanon	Visa required		Visa on arrival for Pakistani nationals holding a valid Jordanian or GCC residence permit. The residence permit issued by a GCC Member State must have a profession of businessmen, managers, company owners, doctors, engineers, and lawyers.
Lesotho	Visa required		
Liberia	e-VOA	3 months	Yellow fever vaccine certificate required.
Libya	Admission restricted		Citizens of Pakistan are allowed to enter Libya only through Misurata (MRA) or Tripoli Mitiga (MJI). They must hold a valid visa and a security letter issued by the Libyan Immigration Authorities.
Liechtenstein	Visa required		
Lithuania	Visa required		
Luxembourg	Visa required		
Madagascar	eVisa / Visa on arrival	90 days	For stays of 61 to 90 days, the visa fee is 59 USD.
Malawi	eVisa	90 days	
Malaysia	eVisa	30 days	
Maldives	Free visa on arrival	30 days	Must complete a traveler declaration within 96 hours before arrival at https://imuga.immigration.gov.mv/ethd; Must have a booking at a registered tourist facility.
Mali	Visa required		
Malta	Visa required		
Marshall Islands	Visa required		
Mauritania	eVisa	30 days	
Mauritius	Visa required		Visa not required for spouses of Mauritian citizens.
Mexico	Visa required		Visa not required for those in possession of a used Multi entry visa or residency for Canada, Japan, United Kingdom or a Schengen Member State.
Micronesia	Visa not required	30 days	
Moldova	Visa required		e-Visa can be obtained at https://www.evisa.gov.md/ for Pakistani nationals holding Schengen Member State visa or residency.
Monaco	Visa required		Must be in possession of a Schengen visa.
Mongolia	Visa required		
Montenegro	Visa required		Visa not required if holding two or multiple entry short-stay visa issued by a Schengen member state for stays that of no more than 90 days.; Visa no required if holding valid USA or UK permanent residence or multi-entry visa.
Morocco	Visa required		e-Visa can be obtained at https://www.acces-maroc.ma for holders of a UK, Ireland, Japan, New Zealand, Australia, Canada, USA or Schengen zone visa.
Mozambique	Visa required		
Myanmar	eVisa	28 days	COVID-19 vaccine certificate and health insurance from an approved retailer is required https://www.mminsurance.gov.mm; e-Visa can be obtained at https://evisa.moip.gov.mm; e-Visa holders must arrive via Yangon, Nay Pyi Taw or Mandalay airports or via land border crossings with Thailand — Tachileik, Myawaddy and Kawthaung or India — Rih Khaw Dar and Tamu.
Namibia	eVisa	3 months	
Nauru	Visa required		
Nepal	Online Visa / Visa on arrival	up to 150 days	Visa on arrival is only available at Tribhuvan International Airport, or at land border checkpoints.; Online Visa and Visa on arrival authorization can be obtained in advance at https://nepaliport.immigration.gov.np/
Netherlands	Visa required		
New Zealand	Visa required		Visa application can be obtained Online at https://www.immigration.govt.nz/new-zealand-visas/visas/visa/visitor-visa.; Visa is valid for up to 9 months. Visa fee is NZD $211.; A High-quality scan of your passport, no physical copy is required. If the visa officer believes that there is an issue, they may ask for a physical passport if they think it is necessary for the application. This will be on a case-by-case basis.; Health exam is required for stays over 6 months
Nicaragua	Visa required		Visa on arrival if holding valid visas of US, Canada, or Schengen Member state.
Niger	Visa required		Yellow fever vaccine certificate required.
Nigeria	eVisa	30 days	
North Korea	Visa required		
North Macedonia	Visa required		Visa not required if holding a multiple entry visa or permanent residence issued by an EU or Schengen member state. May stay no longer than 15 days at a time, and no more than 90 days total in every 180 days.
Norway	Visa required		
Oman	Visa required		Online visa for those holding GCC residency.; Online visa available for spouses or children of G1 nationals that hold 26B or 26M visa subtype (Must travel with them); Online visa available for spouses or children of Brunei, New Zealand and South Korea holding (Must travel with them); Only a marriage certificate, proof of relationship (birth certificate) and proof that the spouse has received a visa are required for the online visa application.
Palau	Free visa on arrival	30 days	Must complete health declaration forum at https://www.palauhdf.com/ before arriving.
Panama	Visa required		Visa not required for 30 days if holding valid residency in Canada, USA, Australia, Japan, South Korea, Singapore or any EU state.
Papua New Guinea	eVisa	60 days	Visitors may apply for a visa online under the "Tourist - Own Itinerary" category.
Paraguay	Visa required		Yellow fever vaccine certificate is required.
Peru	Visa required		
Philippines	eVisa	59 days	Available in single entry (valid for 3 months) or multiple entry (valid for 6 months or 1 year).
Poland	Visa required		
Portugal	Visa required		
Qatar	eVisa		From 1 April 2026, Qatar VOA for Pakistani citizens has been temporarily suspended.
Republic of the Congo	Visa required		Yellow fever vaccine certificate required.
Romania	Visa required		Visa application can be started online at https://eviza.mae.ro, then the applicant must attend the diplomatic mission/consular post of Romania to receive the visa.; Polio vaccination certificate is required.; Visa not required if holding multi-entry visa or residency issued by a Schengen member state.; Visa not required if holding multi-entry visa or residency issued by Bulgaria, Cyprus or Croatia.
Russia	Visa required		Application can be submitted online at https://visa.kdmid.ru/ and then attend the embassy to receive the visa.; Visa not required if visiting Saint Petersburg for up to 72 hours via the cruise St. Peter Line ferries, from Helsinki or Tallinn.
Rwanda	Visa not required	30 days	
Saint Kitts and Nevis	eVisa	30 days	
Saint Lucia	Visa required		Must complete traveler declaration within 72 hours of arriving at https://travelslu.govt.lc/
Saint Vincent and the Grenadines	Visa not required	3 months	
Samoa	Entry permit on arrival	90 days	Will be given a 90-day Visitors Permit upon arrival if they meet the conditions of entry.; Must have a valid visa or permit for entry into the country to which they will travel from Samoa; Must have no deportation record for any other country.
San Marino	Visa not required (Conditional)	30 days	San Marino does not grant entry visas for periods of 30 days or less. However, San Marino has no international airport. A Schengen visa or permission from the Italian authorities to transit is required.
São Tomé and Príncipe	eVisa		Yellow fever vaccination certificate is required.
Saudi Arabia	Visa required		e-Visa available for tourist visas or permanent residents of USA, UK, UAE or Schengen countries; A Stopover Visa can be obtained at https://www.saudia.com/transit-visa for people transiting through Saudi Arabia for less than 96 hours.; Polio vaccine certificate is required.
Senegal	Visa on arrival	1 month	Yellow fever vaccine certificate is required.; Visa on arrival available for Pakistani nationals who have received a “visa préalable” letter before traveling to Senegal. Visa will be stamped on their passport upon arriving at Dakar Blaise Diagne airport.
Serbia	eVisa	90 days	90 days within any 180-day period. Transfers allowed.; Visa not required for passengers with a visa issued by Switzerland, United Kingdom, USA or an EEA Member State for a maximum stay of 90 days.; Short stay (up to 90 days) and long stay (up to 180 days) visas are issued free of charge.
Seychelles	Electronic Border System	3 months	Application can be submitted up to 30 days before travel.; Visitors must upload a reservation confirmation(s) for each visitor's location of stay in Seychelles.; Yellow fever vaccination certificate is required if coming from endemic countries.; Payment of the fee (EUR 10) by credit or debit card.; Valid for one journey only and it expires once exit the country.
Sierra Leone	eVisa / Visa on arrival	3 months / 30 days	Visa on arrival costs 80 USD.; Yellow fever vaccine certificate is required.
Singapore	Visa required		
Slovakia	Visa required		
Slovenia	Visa required		
Solomon Islands	Visa required		Pre-arranged visa can be picked up on arrival.
Somalia	eVisa / Visa on arrival	30 days	
South Africa	eVisa		Yellow fever vaccine certificate is required for those passing through the yellow fever belt of Africa or South America.
South Sudan	eVisa		Obtainable online 30 days single entry for 100 USD, 90 days multiple entry for 200 USD and 180 days multiple entry for 350 USD.; Printed visa authorization must be presented at the time of travel.
South Korea	Visa required		
Spain	Visa required		
Sri Lanka	ETA/ Visa on arrival	30 days	Starting May 26, 2026, Pakistani citizens traveling to Sri Lanka are eligible to obtain a tourist visa (ETA) free of charge for a duration of up to 30 days (double entry).; ETA holders must be able to show (i) a valid onward/return ticket, and (ii) evidence of sufficient funds to cover the cost of stay in Sri Lanka.
Sudan	Visa required		Due to armed civil conflict that broke out April 15, 2023 the Airports, Airspace and land borders are currently closed at this time.
Suriname	eVisa	90 days	Invitation letter is required.
Sweden	Visa required		
Switzerland	Visa required		
Syria	eVisa		
Tajikistan	eVisa	60 days	Passengers can obtain an e-visa before departure at https://www.evisa.tj. They must have a printed e-visa confirmation.
Tanzania	eVisa	90 days	Applicants are advised to submit their applications at least 2 months before their travel date.; Having an invitation letter or a request letter for visa from the Host is an added credibility of their application.
Thailand	eVisa	30 days	Starting January. 01, 2025, an eVisa is available for all nationalities who wish to visit Thailand on transit and visit visas. In certain countries, payment still has to be made at the embassy until a payment system is worked out.
Timor-Leste	Visa on arrival	30 days	
Togo	eVisa	15 days	Yellow fever vaccine certificate is required.
Tonga	Visa required		
Trinidad and Tobago	Visa not required	90 days	Yellow fever vaccine certificate is required.; Minors under 18 years of age without parents, require a certified copy of their parents national ID and a letter giving permission for them to travel.
Tunisia	Visa required		
Turkey	Visa required		e-Visa is available for Pakistani citizens who hold PR or a visa in Schengen Countries, USA, UK or Ireland.
Turkmenistan	Visa required		10-day visa on arrival if holding a letter of invitation provided by a company registered in Turkmenistan with a prior approval from the Foreign Ministry. Visitors can apply to extend their stay for an additional 10 days.; When transiting between two non-bordering countries, visitors can obtain a Turkmenistan transit visa for a five-day stay. This must be applied for in advance at the Turkmenistan Embassy. Visitors must also submit copies of the visas for the country of entry into Turkmenistan and the country of departure from Turkmenistan. Visa fee is 20 USD.
Tuvalu	Visa on arrival	30 days	Will be given a 30-day Visitors Permit upon arrival if they meet the conditions of entry.; Countries not separately listed in Schedule 1 of the Visa Regulations must pay 100 USD upon entry.
Uganda	eVisa	3 months	Yellow fever vaccine certificate is required.
Ukraine	Visa required		
United Arab Emirates	Online visa required		Various types of Visas can be obtained online using "smart service"; e-Visa can be obtained (30 days) regardless of which Airline(s) you have booked with, as long as you have a return flight booked with entry and exit through the same city.; e-Visa can be obtained online if holding a booking from Emirates, Air Arabia or Flydubai tickets.; A visa can also be obtained through a licensed agent, which often allows for faster processing time. For visa options that do not involve a flight booking (Land), and agent will be required to apply for a visa online.; Nationals of Pakistan holding a diplomatic or an official passport do not need a visa to visit the UAE for a duration of 90 days within a 180-day period.; Transit visa is not required when transferring from a UAE-based airport if the passenger does not exit the transit area.
United Kingdom	Visa required		Other exemptions apply for Visa-free Direct Airside Transit.
United States	Visa required		
Uruguay	Visa required		
Uzbekistan	Visa required		Visa not required for holders of a valid residence permit of a GCC country. GCC residency must be valid for three months or more. The maximum duration of stay is 30 days. They must have a physical residence ID card.
Vanuatu	Visa not required	120 days	
Vatican City	Visa required		
Venezuela	eVisa		
Vietnam	eVisa		Passengers can obtain an e-visa at https://evisa.gov.vn/. The information on the e-visa must match exactly the name of the passenger in the passport and passport number.; e-Visa is valid for 90 days and multiple entries.
Yemen	Visa required		Yemen introduced an e-Visa system for visitors who meet certain eligibility requirements (group travel of 10 or more people, business trips, and transit etc.).
Zambia	eVisa	90 days	
Zimbabwe	eVisa	1 month	Host invitation and proof of host residence is required if not staying at a hotel.

== External territories, or Restricted territories ==
External territories, Restricted territories or destinations, and Autonomous zones may have separate entry protocols or require permits for Pakistani citizens to enter. These destinations are part of and governed by other nations and mostly require a visa for the nation that they are attributed to.

Some of these external territories have different laws or are geographically located far away from the nation that they are governed by so they may require more than 1 entry permit or they may have special visa waiver agreements. It is important that visitors check any possible restrictions with the relevant authorities before travel plan confirmation.

Territory	Visa requirement	Allowed stay	Notes (excluding departure fees)
American Samoa	Visa required		Visa-free transit. Must leave the country within 24 hours or face 50 USD fine for every day overstayed. Must apply for OK to board 3 days prior to entry at https://www.legalaffairs.as.gov/copy-of-ok-board-transit-1; Applicants for a visa must have a sponsor. https://www.legalaffairs.as.gov/copy-of-immigration-office-1
Anguilla	eVisa		Visa on arrival for Pakistani nationals who have a valid residence permit for UK, US or Canada.
Aruba	Visa required		Must apply for an Aruba visa at the Netherlands Embassy in person.; Visa not required for Permanent residence holders for Canada, USA, UK, Ireland, and Overseas France.; Visa not required for Schengen country residence or multi-entry Schengen visa holders.; Visa not required for transit in certain cases see website for more details https://www.netherlandsworldwide.nl/caribbean-visa/visa-needed-caribbean; Passengers must complete "Embarkation/Disembarkation Card (ED Card)" before departure at www.edcardaruba.aw . They will receive a "Travel Authorization" which must be presented before boarding.
Ascension Island	eVisa		3 months within any 1-year period.
Bermuda	Visa required		Must have a valid multi-entry visa for Canada, USA or UK that is valid for 45 days after the expiration of a visitor stay.; 45 day multi-entry visa is not required for those who wish to take up residence in Bermuda as the spouse or dependent of a Bermudian.; Visitors must complete Bermuda Arrival card at https://bermudaarrivalcard.com/
Bonaire	Visa required		Bonaire is governed by the Netherlands and is considered a public body, similar to municipalities.; Visitors are required to pay a Tourist Tax online and print out proof of payment to present upon arrival.
British Virgin Islands	Visa required		Visa not required for those who hold 6 months or more residency for Canada, USA or United Kingdom.
Cayman Islands	Visa required		30 day tourist visa on arrival given holding valid PR or residence permit of Canada, United Kingdom or USA. http://www.immigration.gov.ky/portal/page/portal/immhome/visitinghere/visas/visitorsvisas/listofcountries
Cook Islands	Visa not required	31 days	
Curaçao	Visa required		All travelers are required to complete the Digital Immigration Card (DI card) online up to 7 days prior to departure. https://dicardcuracao.com/portal; Yellow fever vaccine certificate required.; Valid Travel Medical insurance required.
Falkland Islands	Visa required		Travel medical insurance for the duration of the intended stay to cover aero-medical evacuation costs to a minimum value of 2,000,000 USD equivalent, is required to apply for a visitor permit.
Faroe Islands	Visa required		Must apply for a separate tourist visa at the Danish embassy specifically for Faroe Islands, even if you have a valid tourist visa or residency visa for EU.; Applicants can apply online at https://applyvisa.um.dk/NVP.App/frontpage and submit documents to the nearest Danish Embassy or processing center.
French Guiana	Visa required		Visa not required if in possession of a long-stay visa or hold a valid residence permit issued by a Schengen member state.; Visa not required if holding a residence permit for Andorra or Monaco.; All other tourist visa applications can be done online in certain cases after submitting the required documents. https://france-visas.gouv.fr/
French Polynesia	Visa required		Visa not required if in possession of a long-stay visa or hold a valid residence permit issued by a Schengen member state; Visa not required if holding a residence permit for Andorra or Monaco.; All other tourist visa applications can be done online in certain cases after submitting the required documents. https://france-visas.gouv.fr/
Gibraltar	Visa required		Visa not required for those who hold permanent residency in the United Kingdom and have not been absent from the UK for more than 2 years.; Visa not required for those who hold family visas to EU nations.; Visa not required for those who hold residency permits to the United Kingdom for a period of 12 months or more.
Greenland	Visa required		Applicants can apply online at https://applyvisa.um.dk/NVP.App/frontpage and submit documents to the nearest Danish Embassy or processing center.
Guadeloupe	Visa required		Visa not required if in possession of a long-stay visa or hold a valid residence permit issued by a Schengen member state; Visa not required for those who hold a residence permit for Andorra or Monaco.; All other tourist visa applications can be done online in certain cases after submitting the required documents. https://france-visas.gouv.fr/
Guam	Visa Required		Must hold a valid United States visa.; Pakistan is not part of the Guam-CNMI Visa Waiver Program, which allows citizens of certain nationalities to enter Guam without a US visa, as long as they enter directly from any nation except for the United States. Guam is a part of the United States, but they do have border controls and customs offices. Pakistani citizens will need to obtain a United States visa before they can enter Guam.; If transiting through the United States, a COVID-19 vaccine certificate is required.
Hong Kong	eVisa		A Hong Kong visa is required.; Separate visa is required for those who wish to visit mainland China.; If you are traveling from Taiwan to Hong Kong, a separate entry permit is required.
Kosovo	Visa required		
Kurdistan Region	eVisa	30 days	Before applying for a visa, applicants must complete the application form to obtain a sponsor code and then provide this code to a sponsor in Kurdistan.; Once the sponsor code is provided, the sponsor applies for the e-Visa, pays the fee, and notifies the applicant of the application results.; Visa exempt for those who were born in Iraq.
Martinique	Visa required		Visa not required if in possession of a long-stay visa or hold a valid residence permit issued by a Schengen member state, Visa not required if holding a residence permit for Andorra or Monaco. All other tourist visa applications can be done online in certain cases after submitting the required documents. https://france-visas.gouv.fr/
Macau	Visa Required		Macau Entry permit is required.; Pakistani nationals in Pakistan are required to use Gerrys visa services to apply for Macau visa, as Chinese Embassy is no longer accepting applications directly. The application can be accessed online https://www.visaforchina.cn/ISB2_EN/. Pakistanis abroad can refer to instructions from the nearest Chinese embassy on how to obtain a Macau visa.; Separate visa is required for those who wish to visit mainland China.
Mayotte	Visa required		Visa not required if in possession of a long-stay visa or hold a valid residence permit issued by a Schengen member state; Visa not required if holding a residence permit for Andorra or Monaco. All other tourist visa applications can be done online in certain cases after submitting the required documents. https://france-visas.gouv.fr/
Montserrat	Visa not required	180 days	
New Caledonia	Visa required		Visa not required if in possession of a long-stay visa or hold a valid residence permit issued by a Schengen member state, Visa not required if holding a residence permit for Andorra or Monaco. All other tourist visa applications can be done online in certain cases after submitting the required documents. https://france-visas.gouv.fr/
Niue	Visa not required	30 days	
Norfolk Island	Visa Required		Visa for Australia is required.; Australian residents travelling from Australia do not need a visa or passport.
Northern Cyprus	Visa required		Applications to enter Northern Cyprus can be processed at the Turkish Republic of Northern Cyprus Islamabad consulate http://eportal.islamabad.mfa.gov.ct.tr
Northern Mariana Islands	Visa Required		Must hold a valid United States visa.; Pakistan is not part of the Guam-CNMI Visa Waiver Program, which allows citizens of certain nationalities to enter Northern Mariana Islands without a US visa, as long as they enter directly from any nation except for the United States. Northern Mariana Islands is a part of the United States, but they do have border controls and customs offices. Pakistani citizens will need to obtain a United States visa before they can enter Northern Mariana Islands.; A COVID-19 double-dose vaccine certificate is required.
Palestine	Visa required		
Pitcairn	Visa not required	14 days	
Puerto Rico	Visa required		United States tourist visa is required.
Réunion	Visa required		Visa not required if in possession of a long-stay visa or hold a valid residence permit issued by a Schengen member state, Visa not required if in possession of a residence permit for Andorra or Monaco. All other tourist visa applications can be done online in certain cases after submitting the required documents. https://france-visas.gouv.fr/
Republic of Abkhazia	Visa Required		Tourists from all countries (except Georgia) can visit Abkhazia for a period not exceeding 24 hours as part of an organized tourist group.; Georgia does not recognize Abkhazia. Under Georgian law, it is considered illegal to enter Abkhazia through the Russian border. Evidence of an Abkhazian visa, Abkhaz stamps or a stamp of Russian checkpoints on the border with Abkhazia in your passport, may result in you being fined, visa cancellation, deportation or being banned/rejected a visa from Georgia.
Saba	Visa required		Saba is governed by the Netherlands and is considered a public body, similar to municipalities.
Saint Barthélemy	Visa required		Visa not required if in possession of a long-stay visa or hold a valid residence permit issued by a Schengen member state; Visa not required if holding a residence permit for Andorra or Monaco. All other tourist visa applications can be done online in certain cases after submitting the required documents. https://france-visas.gouv.fr/
Saint Helena	eVisa		
Saint Martin	Visa required		Visa not required if in possession of a long-stay visa or hold a valid residence permit issued by a Schengen member state, Visa not required if in possession of a residence permit for Andorra or Monaco. All other tourist visa applications can be done online in certain cases after submitting the required documents. https://france-visas.gouv.fr/
Saint Pierre and Miquelon	Visa required		Visa not required if in possession of a long-stay visa or hold a valid residence permit issued by a Schengen member state.; Visa not required if holding a residence permit for Andorra or Monaco.; All other tourist visa applications can be done online in certain cases after submitting the required documents. https://france-visas.gouv.fr/; For those traveling to Saint Pierre and Miquelon directly from Canada directly, a Canadian Permanent residence card may be used to enter
Sint Eustatius	Visa required		Sint Eustatius is governed by the Netherlands and is considered a public body, similar to municipalities.
Somaliland	Visa required		Visa applications can be printed off online. Please contact the nearest embassy or consulate for further instructions.
South Ossetia	Visa required		To enter South Ossetia, visitors must have a multiple-entry visa for Russia and register their stay with the Migration Service of the Ministry of Internal Affairs within 3 days.
Svalbard	Visa not required		Svalbard and Jan Mayen require no visa for anyone to take up residency, work or tourism.; The only flights or ferries to Svalbard transit through Norway. Norway requires a transit visa for most Pakistani nationals. May transit without a visa if holding USA, Japan or Canadian permanent residence
Taiwan (Republic of China)	Visa required		Pakistani citizens are subject to special visa requirements and may only visit Taiwan under specific conditions, including official invitations, business activities, medical treatment, family visits, or participation in approved events.; Those visiting Taiwan on business must be interviewed by a Taiwanese consular officer, and their sponsors must submit a letter of guarantee to the Bureau of Consular Affairs in Taiwan.; e-Visa is available to those who wish to enter Taiwan for the purpose of conducting business at the recommendation of local offices of the Taiwan External Trade Development Council (TAITRA)
Turks and Caicos	Visa required		
Zanzibar	eVisa	90 days	Visa for Tanzania required.; e-Visa can be obtained at https://visa.immigration.go.tz; Applicants are advised to submit their applications at least 2 months before their travel date.; Having an invitation letter or a request letter for visa from the Host is an added credibility of their application.; If an applicant wishes to visit both Tanzania Mainland and Zanzibar, he/she is advised to select his first destination while filling the form.

== Non-visa restrictions ==
=== Blank passport pages ===
Many countries require a minimum number of blank pages to be available in the passport being presented, typically one or two pages. Endorsement pages, which often appear after the visa pages, are not counted as being valid or available.

=== Vaccination ===
Cover of the new International Certificate of Vaccination issued by the Bureau of Quarantine in the Philippines since 2021

The African countries of Angola, Benin, Burkina Faso, Burundi, Cameroon, Central African Republic, Democratic Republic of the Congo, Republic of the Congo, Côte d'Ivoire, Gabon, Ghana, Guinea-Bissau, Mali, Niger, Sierra Leone and Togo, South Sudan and Uganda, along with French Guiana in South America, require all incoming passengers older than nine months to one year, to have a current International Certificate of Vaccination or Prophylaxis.

Some other countries require vaccination only if the passenger is coming from an infected area or has visited one recently or has transited for 12 hours in those countries: Algeria, Botswana, Cabo Verde, Chad, Djibouti, Egypt, Eswatini, Ethiopia, Gambia, Ghana, Guinea, Lesotho, Libya, Equatorial Guinea, Eritrea, Madagascar, Malawi, Mauritania, Mauritius, Mozambique, Namibia, Nigeria, Papua New Guinea, Seychelles, Somalia, South Africa, Sudan, Tunisia, Uganda, Tanzania, Zambia and Zimbabwe.

=== Passport validity length ===
Very few countries, such as Paraguay, just require a valid passport on arrival.

However many countries and groupings now require only an identity card – especially from their neighbours. Other countries may have special bilateral arrangements that depart from the generality of their passport validity length policies to shorten the period of passport validity required for each other's citizens or even accept passports that have already expired (but not been cancelled).

Some countries, such as Japan, Ireland and the United Kingdom, require a passport valid throughout the period of the intended stay.

In the absence of specific bilateral agreements, countries requiring passports to be valid for at least 6 more months on arrival include Afghanistan, Algeria, Anguilla, Bahrain, Bhutan, Botswana, British Virgin Islands, Brunei, Cambodia, Cameroon, Cape Verde, Cayman Islands, Central African Republic, Chad, Comoros, Costa Rica, Côte d'Ivoire, Curaçao, Ecuador, Egypt, El Salvador, Equatorial Guinea, Fiji, Gabon, Guinea Bissau, Guyana, Haiti, India, Indonesia, Iran, Iraq, Israel, Jordan, Kenya, Kiribati, Kuwait, Laos, Madagascar, Malaysia, Marshall Islands, Mongolia, Myanmar, Namibia, Nepal, Nicaragua, Nigeria, Oman, Palau, Papua New Guinea, Peru, Philippines, Qatar, Rwanda, Samoa, Saudi Arabia, Singapore, Solomon Islands, Somalia, Sri Lanka, Sudan, Suriname, Tanzania, Thailand, Timor-Leste, Tokelau, Tonga, Turkey, Tuvalu, Uganda, United Arab Emirates, Vanuatu, Venezuela, and Vietnam.

Countries requiring passports valid for at least 4 months on arrival include Micronesia and Zambia.

Countries requiring passports with a validity of at least 3 months beyond the date of intended departure include Azerbaijan, Bosnia and Herzegovina, Honduras, Montenegro, Nauru, Moldova and New Zealand. Similarly, the EEA countries of Iceland, Liechtenstein, Norway, all European Union countries (except Ireland) together with Switzerland also require 3 months validity beyond the date of the bearer's intended departure unless the bearer is an EEA or Swiss national.

Countries requiring passports valid for at least 3 months on arrival include Albania, North Macedonia, Panama, and Senegal.

Bermuda requires passports to be valid for at least 45 days upon entry.

Countries that require a passport validity of at least one month beyond the date of intended departure include Eritrea, Hong Kong, Lebanon, Macau, the Maldives and South Africa.

==== Maximum passport age ====
Countries of the Schengen area require non-EU passports to be less than 10 years old upon entry.

=== Criminal record ===
Some countries, including Australia, Canada, Fiji, New Zealand and the United States, routinely deny entry to non-citizens who have a criminal record, while others impose restrictions depending on the type of conviction and the length of the sentence.

=== Persona non grata ===
The government of a country can declare a diplomat persona non grata, banning them from entering the country or expelling them if they have already entered. In non-diplomatic use, the authorities of a country may also declare a foreigner persona non grata permanently or temporarily, usually because of unlawful activity.

=== Israeli stamps ===
Kuwait, Lebanon, Libya, and Yemen do not allow entry to people with passport stamps from Israel or whose passports have either a used or an unused Israeli visa, or where there is evidence of previous travel to Israel such as entry or exit stamps from neighbouring border posts in transit countries such as Jordan and Egypt.

To circumvent this Arab League boycott of Israel, the Israeli immigration services have now mostly ceased to stamp foreign nationals' passports on either entry to or exit from Israel (unless the entry is for some work-related purposes). Since 15 January 2013, Israel no longer stamps foreign passports at Ben Gurion Airport. Passports are still (as of 22 June 2017) stamped at Erez when passing into and out of Gaza.

Iran refuses admission to holders of passports containing an Israeli visa or stamp that is less than 12 months old.

=== Biometrics ===
Several countries mandate that all travellers, or all foreign travellers, be fingerprinted on arrival and will refuse admission to or even arrest travellers who refuse to comply. In some countries, such as the United States, this may apply even to transit passengers who merely wish to change planes rather than go landside.

Fingerprinting countries/regions include Afghanistan, Argentina, Brunei, Cambodia, China, Ethiopia, Ghana, Guinea, India, Japan, Kenya (both fingerprints and a photo are taken), Malaysia upon entry and departure, Mongolia, Saudi Arabia, the Schengen Area, Singapore, South Korea, Taiwan, Thailand, Uganda, the United Arab Emirates and the United States.

Many countries also require a photo be taken of people entering the country. The United States, which does not fully implement exit control formalities at its land frontiers (although long mandated by its own legislation), intends to implement facial recognition for passengers departing from international airports to identify people who overstay their visa.

Together with fingerprint and face recognition, iris scanning is one of three biometric identification technologies internationally standardised since 2006 by the International Civil Aviation Organization (ICAO) for use in e-passports and the United Arab Emirates conducts iris scanning on visitors who need to apply for a visa. The United States Department of Homeland Security has announced plans to greatly increase the biometric data it collects at US borders. In 2018, Singapore began trials of iris scanning at three land and maritime immigration checkpoints.

== See also ==
- Visa policy of Pakistan
- Pakistani passport
- List of nationalities forbidden at border
