= Pakistani nationality law =

The Pakistan Citizenship Act, 1951

Constituent Assembly of Pakistan
- Long title: An Act to provide for Pakistan citizenship
- Citation: Act No. II of 1951
- Territorial extent: Pakistan
- Enacted by: Constituent Assembly of Pakistan
- Enacted: 13 April 1951
- Commenced: 13 April 1951

Related legislation
- The Foreigners Act, 1946
- Status: Amended

The primary law governing nationality of Pakistan is the Pakistan Citizenship Act, 1951, which came into force on 13 April 1951.

With few exceptions, all individuals born in the country are automatically citizens at birth. Foreign nationals may naturalise as Pakistani citizens after residing in the country for at least five years and showing proficiency in at least one vernacular language of Pakistan. Commonwealth citizens who make a substantial financial investment in the state are eligible for a facilitated naturalisation process.

Pakistan was previously ruled by the British Empire and local residents were British subjects and British protected persons. Although Pakistan gained independence in 1947 and Pakistanis no longer hold British nationality, they remain Commonwealth citizens under British law. When residing in the United Kingdom, Pakistani citizens are eligible to vote in UK elections and serve in public office there.

== Terminology ==
The distinction between the meaning of the terms citizenship and nationality is not always clear in the English language and differs by country. Generally, nationality refers a person's legal belonging to a nation state and is the common term used in international treaties when referring to members of a state; citizenship refers to the set of rights and duties a person has in that nation. In the Pakistani context, these terms are used interchangeably.

== National status within British India ==
=== Company administration ===
The East India Company was founded by royal charter in 1600 and granted a monopoly on all English trade with Asia. Over the course of the 17th century, the company secured a strong commercial presence in the Indian subcontinent through trade in indigo dye, saltpeter, and Indian textiles. Operations became more lucrative as the Mughal Empire entered into decline in the 18th century, giving the company opportunity to gain further advantages by intervening in regional politics. The vast financial resources of the firm and its superior military enabled it to defeat rival European trade companies and become the dominant power in India. The company itself ruled as the direct governing body from 1757 to 1858, though sovereignty was often shared with the Crown. Although legislation was enacted referencing British subjects in India, no comprehensive nationality statute existed to define which persons were subjects, leaving the status of native Indians ambiguous throughout this period.

Legislation passed in 1852 allowed foreigners residing in territory governed by the East India Company to naturalise as British subjects by application to the government. There was no minimum residence requirement and candidates simply needed approval from a relevant official. The oath of allegiance administered to successful applicants required them to swear loyal service to the company, as well as allegiance to the British monarch.

=== Direct imperial rule ===
India was brought under direct rule of the British Empire in 1858. Territories were broadly divided between two political groupings: the provinces of British India, which were administered by the British government, and the princely states, which were areas ruled by local monarchs given limited autonomy in exchange for accepting British suzerainty. Provincial residents were British subjects, while subjects of princely state rulers were considered British protected persons instead.

Despite Britain's sovereignty over both types of holdings, domestic law in the United Kingdom treated the princely states as foreign territory. British protected persons were treated as aliens in the United Kingdom, but both Indian British subjects and protected persons could be issued British Indian passports. Protected persons could not travel to the UK without first requesting permission, but were afforded the same consular protection as British subjects when travelling outside of the Empire. A person with connections both to directly governed portions of British India and one of the princely states could be a British subject and British protected person simultaneously.

British nationality law during this time was uncodified and did not have a standard set of regulations, relying instead on past precedent and common law. Until the mid-19th century, it was unclear whether naturalisation rules in the United Kingdom were applicable in other parts of the Empire. Each colony had wide discretion in developing their own procedures and requirements for admitting foreigners as subjects. Naturalisation in Britain was achieved through individual Acts of Parliament until 1844, when a more streamlined administrative process was introduced. In 1847, the Imperial Parliament formalised a clear distinction between subjects who were naturalised in the UK and those who did so in other territories. Individuals who were naturalised in the UK were deemed to have received the status by imperial naturalisation, which was valid throughout the Empire. Those naturalised in colonies were said to have gone through local naturalisation and were given subject status valid only within the relevant territory. For example, a subject locally naturalised in Bengal was a British subject there, but not in England nor New South Wales. Like protected persons, locally naturalised British subjects were still entitled to imperial protection when travelling outside of the Empire.

The Imperial Parliament brought regulations for British subject status into codified statute law for the first time with passage of the British Nationality and Status of Aliens Act 1914. British subject status was standardised as a common nationality across the Empire. This Act allowed Dominions and British India to grant subject status to aliens by imperial naturalisation, but did not prevent further grants of local naturalisation under local legislation. The continued application of local naturalisation allowed British Indian authorities to avoid adding English language requirements to the naturalisation process.

== Post-independence policies ==
=== Partition and transition ===
British India was partitioned into two independent nations on 15 August 1947, the Union of India and Dominion of Pakistan. Pakistan transitionally retained the British sovereign as its head of state in the post-partition period, using its Dominion status as a deterrent against possible Indian incursion. Pakistanis continued to be British subjects until independent Pakistan enacted its own nationality legislation. Subjects of the princely states were previously considered British protected persons but lost that status when the Indian Independence Act 1947 released those states from British vassalage. The states' subsequent accession to Pakistan meant that former protected persons became British subjects of Pakistan.

British subject status was reformed under the British Nationality Act 1948. The Act abandoned the common nationality used across the Empire and redefined British subject to mean any citizen of a Commonwealth country. A Commonwealth citizen was defined in this Act to have the same meaning. British subject/Commonwealth citizen status co-existed with the citizenship of each Commonwealth country. Because Pakistan had not enacted citizenship regulations by the time the 1948 Act took effect, Pakistanis (and citizens of all other Dominions without citizenship laws) were provisionally classed as "British subjects without citizenship".

The partition resulted in large-scale population movements across the new borders separating Pakistan and India. Provisions in the Pakistan Citizenship Act, 1951 reflect this and provided a pathway for migrants to automatically acquire a status matching the country of their choice post-partition. Any individual domiciled in Pakistan automatically became a Pakistani citizen on 13 April 1951 if they were: born in Pakistan, born to at least one parent or grandparent who themself was born in Pakistan, born in India but domiciled in Pakistan, or naturalised as a British subject in Pakistan and had renounced their previous nationalities. Additionally, any other person who migrated to Pakistan from another part of the Indian subcontinent before the Act's commencement with the intention of permanently residing in Pakistan was granted citizenship.

=== Commonwealth citizenship ===
Commonwealth citizens initially continued to hold an automatic right to settle in the United Kingdom and Ireland after 1949. Non-white immigration into the UK was systemically discouraged, but strong economic conditions in Britain following the Second World War attracted an unprecedented wave of colonial migration. In response, the British Parliament imposed immigration controls on any Commonwealth citizens originating from outside the British Islands with the Commonwealth Immigrants Act 1962. Ireland had continued to allow all British subjects free movement despite independence in 1922 as part of the Common Travel Area arrangement, but moved to mirror Britain's restriction in 1962 by limiting this ability only to people born on the islands of Great Britain or Ireland. Britain somewhat relaxed these measures in 1971 for patrials, subjects whose parents or grandparents were born in the United Kingdom, which gave effective preferential treatment to white Commonwealth citizens. The UK later updated its nationality law to reflect the more modest boundaries of its remaining territory and overseas possessions with the British Nationality Act 1981, which redefined the term "British subject" to no longer also include Commonwealth citizens.

Under the 1951 Pakistan Citizenship Act, Commonwealth citizens were technically eligible to obtain Pakistani citizenship by registration in lieu of naturalisation, but no subsidiary legislation or regulations were published that made this pathway available. While Commonwealth citizens have a separate status within Pakistani nationality law, they are not distinguished from non-Commonwealth foreign nationals for other purposes, including immigration. Following Pakistan's withdrawal from the Commonwealth in 1972, Pakistani citizens ceased to be Commonwealth citizens in British law after passage of the Pakistan Act 1973. Pakistanis reacquired this status after the country rejoined the organisation in 1989. As Commonwealth citizens, they are eligible to vote and stand for public office in the UK.

=== Territorial change and subsequent reforms ===
==== Jammu and Kashmir ====
Jammu and Kashmir was a princely state of British India with a local Hindu monarch who ruled a population that was majority Muslim. This state initially remained independent at partition in 1947 but chose to join India later that year. The decision was unpopular among the local populace and triggered revolts organised by those who wanted the state to join Pakistan, leading to the Indo-Pakistani War of 1947–1948. Control of the state was split between the two sides by the Line of Control after the end of armed conflict, although both Pakistan and India claim sovereignty over the whole territory. Any person who migrated from the former princely state to permanently reside in Pakistan is a Pakistani citizen, as well as individuals considered to be Kashmiri subjects who hold Pakistani passports and reside overseas in the United Kingdom or any other country specified by the federal government.

==== Loss of eastern territory ====
At the time of partition, Pakistan included East Bengal, a noncontiguous territory separated from the rest of the country by India. Following the 1971 Bangladesh Liberation War, Pakistan lost control of the region, which became independent as Bangladesh. The Pakistan Citizenship (Amendment) Ordinance, 1978 addressed the new political situation and removed citizenship from Pakistani citizens who were resident in East Pakistan prior to separation and remained domiciled there after independence and from those who had been domiciled in West Pakistan but had migrated to Bangladesh after 1971. East Pakistanis who were resident overseas at the time of separation could elect to remain Pakistani citizens by obtaining a certificate of citizenship from the government.

Bihari Muslims, a community of citizens who migrated to East Bengal from the Indian state of Bihar during the partition of India, was particularly affected by Bangladeshi independence. This group largely did not support the division of Pakistan and refused to acquire Bangladeshi nationality, but did not have the resources to resettle in West Pakistan. The vast majority of this minority group were stateless until 2008, when the Bangladesh High Court ruled that Biharis born in the country would be granted citizenship. While about 170,000 Biharis have since been repatriated to Pakistan, more than 400,000 "stranded Pakistanis" remain resident in Bangladesh.

==== Multiple citizenship ====
Restrictions on holding multiple nationalities were relaxed in 1972. Pakistani nationals who naturalise in the United Kingdom or any other country that the federal government specifies no longer automatically lose their Pakistani nationality. The government negotiates bilateral dual nationality treaties with participating states, which each separately agree with Pakistan that the nationals of either country are not required to renounce their nationality before naturalising in the other. Despite official sanction of holding alternate nationalities with a limited set of countries, dual nationals are constitutionally prohibited from serving in the Parliament of Pakistan. Since 2013, they have also been barred from public office in Punjab.

==== Refugee access to citizenship ====
Contrary to the 1951 Act's grant of birthright citizenship to virtually all persons born in the country, children of Afghan refugees who fled to Pakistan after the start of the Soviet–Afghan War in 1979 have been routinely denied citizenship. Although these refugees were to be repatriated following agreement of the 1988 Geneva Accords, the vast majority have remained in Pakistan due to ongoing instability in Afghanistan.

Pakistani courts have offered conflicting opinions on the application of birthright citizenship. In the 1999 case Ghulam Sanai v. Assistant Director, National Registration Office, the Peshawar High Court ruled that the provisions for citizenship by birthplace and descent in the 1951 Act should be interpreted together in a correct reading of the law. The effect of this reinterpretation limited the application of birthright citizenship only to children born to at least one Pakistani parent. The Islamabad High Court issued a contradictory judgement in 2018, ruling that a child of Somali refugees had acquired Pakistani citizenship by virtue of birth in Pakistan and that the 1951 Act should be interpreted as written rather than in the method prescribed by the Peshawar court, along with a further ruling in 2022 that any person born in Pakistan was entitled to Pakistani citizenship. There were 1.7 million undocumented Afghan refugees living in Pakistan without citizenship or residency in November 2023, when the government began a mass deportation initiative to expel all illegal migrants from the country.

== Acquisition and loss of citizenship ==
=== Entitlement by birth or descent ===
Any person born in Pakistan since 13 April 1951 automatically receives Pakistani citizenship by birth except if they are the child of a foreign diplomat or enemy alien. Children born overseas are automatically Pakistani citizens by descent if either parent is a citizen otherwise than by descent or is employed by the government of Pakistan. Individuals born to parents who are citizens by descent only may alternatively acquire citizenship if their births are registered at a Pakistani diplomatic mission. Children born before 18 April 2000 were entitled to citizenship by descent through their fathers only. However, minor children of Pakistani mothers could apply for registration as citizens in a separate process that was subject to discretionary approval of the government.

=== Voluntary acquisition ===
Foreigners over the age of 18 may become Pakistani citizens by naturalisation after residing in the country for at least four years within a seven-year period, followed by a further one year of residence immediately before application. Applicants must demonstrate proficiency in at least one of the languages of Pakistan, satisfy a good character requirement, intend to reside permanently in the country or begin service in the Pakistani government, and cannot hold citizenship of countries that bar Pakistani citizens from naturalisation. Commonwealth citizens may alternatively acquire citizenship by registration with a financial investment in the country. After transferring 5,000,000 Pakistani rupees to the State Bank, investors receive an immigrant visa. Citizenship is then granted on their arrival in Pakistan. Foreign women married to (and widows formerly married to) Pakistani men are entitled to apply for citizenship, provided that their husbands did not acquire citizenship by naturalisation or registration.

=== Loss and resumption ===
Pakistani citizenship may be voluntarily relinquished by any person above age 18, provided that the applicant already holds (or has documentary assurance that they will soon acquire) another citizenship. Minor children of a father who gave up citizenship also cease to be citizens, unless they remained living in Pakistan at the time of their father's renunciation. Former citizens who renounced their status may subsequently apply to resume their Pakistani citizenship. There are no specific requirements for citizenship resumption other than making a written declaration to the government.

Naturalised citizens may be involuntarily deprived of the status if they fraudulently acquired it, are sentenced to imprisonment for more than 12 months in any jurisdiction in the world, or they wilfully perform an act that constitutes a breach of loyalty to the state. Any citizen who continuously resides abroad for more than seven years are also subject to deprivation, unless they are employed by the government while overseas or have submitted a declaration of intent to retain citizenship at a Pakistani diplomatic mission.

Although the Pakistan Citizenship Act, 1951 provides for the deprivation of citizenship from any Pakistani who becomes a citizen of another country, the Lahore High Court has ruled that this process is not automatic and does not apply unless acquiring the foreign citizenship is conditional on renouncing Pakistani citizenship. Despite this lack of deprivation, Pakistan has concluded a series of bilateral agreements with other countries that explicitly allow dual nationality with the participating states. The 22 countries that have such an arrangement with Pakistan are: Australia, Bahrain, Belgium, Canada, Denmark, Egypt, Finland, France, Germany, Iceland, Ireland, Italy, Jordan, Luxembourg, the Netherlands, New Zealand, Norway, Sweden, Switzerland, Syria, the United Kingdom, and the United States.

== See also ==
- Visa policy of Pakistan
- Visa requirements for Pakistani citizens
