= Visa policy of Pakistan =

Policy on permits required to enter Pakistan

Visitors to Pakistan must obtain a visa online or in certain cases from one of the Pakistani diplomatic missions unless they are citizens from one of the visa-exempt countries. https://dgip.gov.pk/visa/categories.php

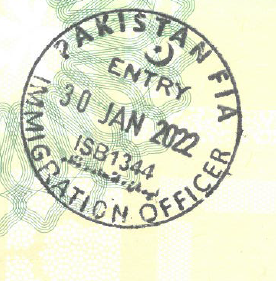
Pakistan entry passport stamp issued at Islamabad International Airport

== Visa policy map ==
Visa policy of Pakistan Pakistan Visa not required (90 days) Visa not required (30 days) Online Visa Visa required Admission refused

== Visa exemption ==
=== Ordinary passports ===
Citizens from the following countries who hold ordinary passports do not require a visa for Pakistan for the following period.

90 days

- (Cooperation Council for the Arab States of the Gulf) All Gulf Cooperation Council member states

- Maldives

30 days

- Nepal

Date of visa changes
- Nationals of Maldives and Nepal have never needed a visa to enter Pakistan
- 14 August 2024: Gulf Cooperation Council (GCC) Countries

Cancelled:

- 1 October 2015: Zambia
- January 2017: Iceland

- In addition, holders of a United Nations passport do not require a visa for up to 90 days.
- In addition, holders of an Interpol passport do not require a visa for up to 90 days.

=== Non-ordinary passports ===
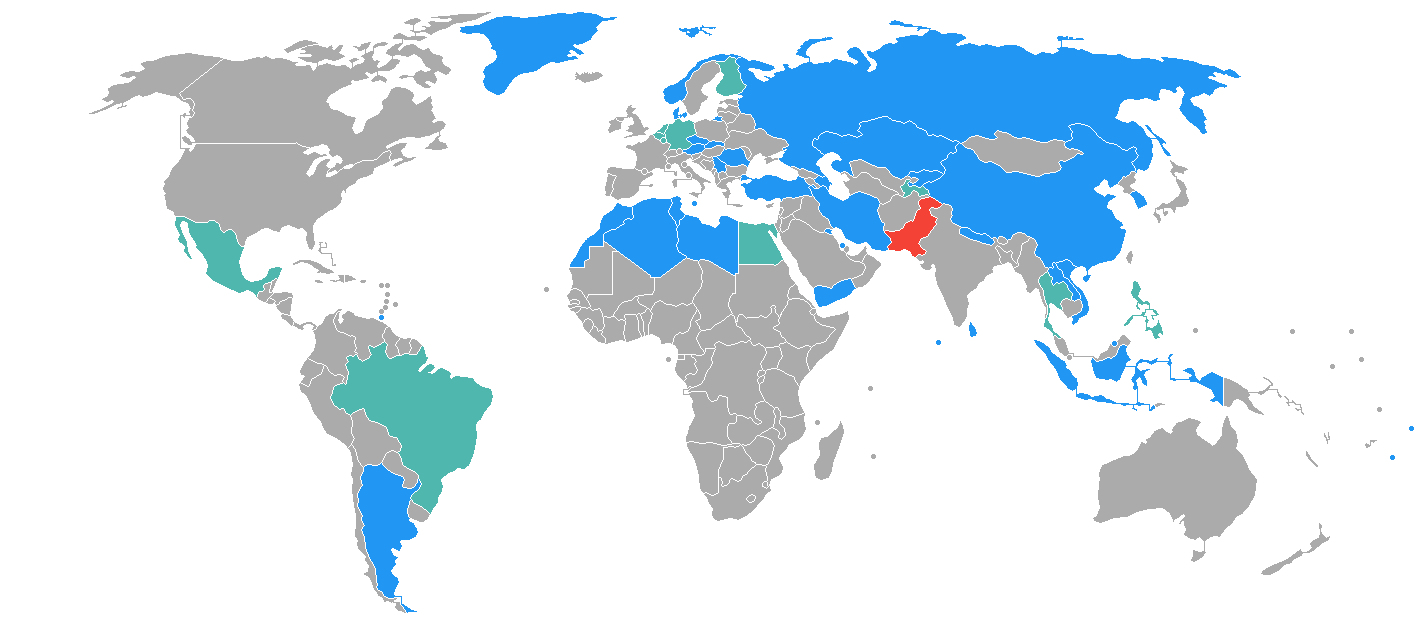
Pakistan Visa not required for diplomatic, official or service category passports Visa not required for diplomatic passports

Under reciprocal agreements, holders of diplomatic or various types of passports (official and service) of the following countries and territories may enter and remain in Pakistan without a visa for the following period:

3 months

- Argentina^{D O}
- Austria^{D O}
- Bahrain^{D O}
- Belarus^{D O S}
- Belgium^{D}
- Belize^{D O}
- Brazil^{D}
- Cuba^{D O S}
- Cyprus^{D O S}
- Czech Republic^{D O S}
- Denmark^{D O S}
- Finland^{D}
- Georgia^{D O S}
- Germany^{D}
- Iran^{D O}
- Jordan^{D O S}
- Kazakhstan^{D O}
- Kuwait^{D O}
- Luxembourg^{D}
- Maldives^{D O S}
- Mexico^{D}
- Morocco^{D O S}
- Netherlands^{D}
- Norway^{D O}
- Poland^{D O}
- Romania^{D O}
- Russia^{D O S}
- Senegal^{D O S}
- Slovakia^{D O}
- South Korea^{D O}
- Tajikistan^{D}
- Tunisia^{D O}
- Turkey^{D O}
- Yemen^{D O}

2 months

- Kyrgyzstan^{D O}

1 month

- Azerbaijan^{D O}
- Brunei^{D O S}
- China^{D O S}
- Egypt^{D}
- Indonesia^{D O S}
- Laos^{D O S}
- Malaysia^{D O S}
- Malta^{D O}
- Nepal^{D O S}
- Philippines^{D}
- Serbia^{D O}
- Sri Lanka^{D O}
- Thailand^{D}
- Turkmenistan^{D}
- Vietnam^{D O S}

_{D - Diplomatic passports}
_{O - Official passports}
_{S - Service passports}

=== Future changes ===
Pakistan has signed visa exemption agreements with the following countries, but they have not yet been ratified:

Country	Passports	Agreement signed on
Sudan	Diplomatic, official	7 November 2026
Oman	Diplomatic, official, service, special	14 October 2026
Saudi Arabia	Diplomatic, service	21 September 2026

== Online Visa ==
Pakistan Electronic Visa
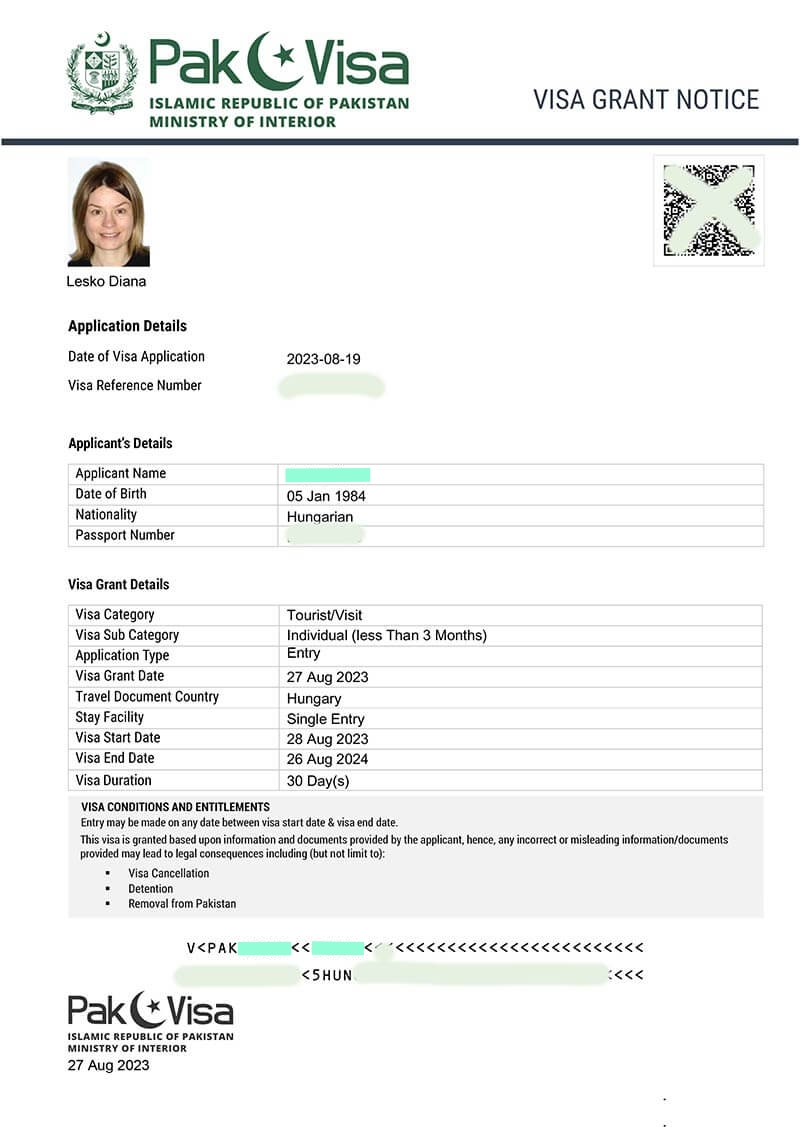
- Pakistan eVisa issued to a Hungarian citizen
- Website: visa.nadra.gov.pk

Starting January 1, 2026, Pakistan has suspended the Visa Prior to Arrival, which was previously granted free of charge and usually issued within 48 hours. Under the current online visa regime, travelers are expected to wait 7–10 business days for visa processing and must pay a fee depending on their nationality and duration of stay.

Obtaining a visa online requires to have a google account to use Google's 2FAS authenticator.

Citizens of all countries except the following are eligible to apply for an online visa:

- Armenia
- India
- Israel
- Taiwan

== Mandatory registration ==
Visitors from the following countries are obliged to register with the police upon arrival to Pakistan:

- Bhutan
- India
- Israel

Police registration is typically performed by hotel staff as part of the check-in process. In person visits to police stations are only required of visitors who choose not to stay in licensed hotels or hostels.

== Special categories ==
=== Overseas Pakistani citizens and Persons of Pakistani Origin ===
Visas are not required for holders of a Pakistan Origin Card (POC), a National Identity Card for Overseas Pakistani (NICOP), or any passport bearing a "Visa exempt" stamp by Pakistani authorities.

=== Substitute visas ===
Nationals of Turkey holding a valid visa for the Schengen Area, United Kingdom or the United States, can obtain a visa on arrival.

=== Indian passport holders ===
Applications from Indian passport holders must be cleared directly from the Ministry of Interior, though they are not barred from visiting Pakistan despite being subject to additional regulations, including mandatory police registration, regardless of visa type.

Foreigners of Indian origin were subject to this regulation as well. On 25 January 2019, the policy was revised for Indian Origin United Kingdom and United States Nationals.

Indian nationals are also restricted in the availability of ports of entry to Pakistan, and instead must enter and leave the country via designated points, including the Wagah border, as well as through airports in Islamabad, Lahore, and Karachi.

Indian nationals are typically required to enter and exit Pakistan through the same post, unless permission is sought in advance.

Indian passport holders are not granted tourist visas, and are only permitted to apply for visas to visit family and friends, business visas, transit visas, and visas for religious pilgrimage.

6 month business visas are granted to Indian passport holders, with multiple entries permitted.

Indian passport holders are also ineligible for any visa extensions, though passport holders who stay longer than the time permitted by the visa are subject to a fee of 40 Rupees per day of overstay.

Indian residents applying for a tourism, visit or student Pakistani visa may especially face issues pertaining to their religious backgrounds. Many visa applicants have also expressed concerns for the extended process that allegedly takes almost twice as much time as other such visas as well as the on and off government imposed bans upon inter-country travels between India and Pakistan.

Former Indian nationals holding American, British, or Canadian passports are eligible to travel to Pakistan by obtaining an e-visa. The application process is streamlined through Pakistan's official e-visa portal, allowing for a convenient and efficient approval system.

=== Armenian passport holders ===
Pakistan was the only country in the world that did not recognize Armenia, that was until August 31, 2025, when diplomatic relations were established. Though Pakistan does not have a diplomatic mission in Armenia yet, applicants for Pakistani visas can apply in a third country if they are legal permanent residents in that country.

== Visitor statistics ==
Most visitors arriving in Pakistan on a short-term basis were from the following countries:

Rank	Country	2018
1	China	565,212
2	United Kingdom	540,709
3	India	212,370
4	United States	209,633
5	Saudi Arabia	150,102
6	Turkey	150,009
7	Afghanistan	72,000

== See also ==
- Visa requirements for Pakistani citizens
- Pakistani passport
