= Bangladeshi passport =

E-Passport of the People's Republic of Bangladesh

Bangladesh passport বাংলাদেশ পাসপোর্ট
- The front cover of a contemporary Bangladeshi biometric passport
- Type: Passport
- Issued by: Department of Immigration & Passports
- First issued: 8 February 1973 (Traditional Passport); 1 April 2010 (Machine Readable Passport or MRP); 22 January 2020 (Electronic Passport or E-Passport)
- Purpose: Identification
- Valid in: Every country except for Israel
- Eligibility: Bangladeshi citizenship
- Expiration: 10 years for those aged 18 to 65 years; 5 years for those aged under 18 or aged over 65 years
- Cost: MRP: Regular: ৳3450 (taxes included); Express: ৳6900 (taxes included); E-Passport: Regular: ৳4025 (taxes included); Express: ৳6325 (taxes included); Super Express: ৳8625 (taxes included)
- Website: epassport.gov.bd

The Bangladeshi passport is an ICAO compliant, machine-readable and biometric e-passport issued for the purpose of travel to foreign countries by the passport holder. Bangladesh is the first country in South Asia to issue e-passports for all eligible citizens. The passport booklet is manufactured, printed and issued by the Department of Immigration & Passports of the Ministry of Home Affairs. This electronic microprocessor chip embedded e-passport has forty-one different security features, including holographic images embossed in thin-film laminate, which change colour under light and appear to move.

Demographic and biometric information of the e-passport holder are stored on the chip inside the e-passport. This information includes the fingerprints of all ten fingers of the passport holder; the iris scan of both eyes; a color photograph of the face of the bearer; their digital signature; etc. Depending on the age of the applicant, the e-passport is valid for either five years or ten years and it is distributed by the Government of The People's Republic of Bangladesh, or by any of its overseas diplomatic missions, to eligible Bangladeshi nationals who are citizens by birth, by descent or through naturalization.

The Government of Bangladesh issues three different types of passports. These are Diplomatic passports with a red cover; Official passports with a blue cover; and ordinary passports with a green cover. The cover of the passport is made of a tough and tear resistant textile material that is highly impervious to chemicals, sweat, damp and heat. Diplomatic passports are only issued to diplomats of Bangladesh. Official passports are only issued to Bangladesh government employees, government officials and envoys. Regular or ordinary passports are issued to the rest of the citizens of Bangladesh. The entire passport is made of environment-friendly materials. It is aesthetically designed with all the blank visa pages of the passport covered in images of important historical landmarks and buildings of Bangladesh, as well as popular Bangladeshi tourist attractions, with their names written in both Bengali and English. Page numbers of the passport are also bilingual – written both in Bengali and in English.

== History ==
After the Bangladesh Liberation War, Act Number 9 of 1973 (called The Bangladesh Passport Order, 1973) which was signed into law by the President of the People's Republic of Bangladesh, on 8 February 1973, lead to the creation and issuing of the first passport of newly independent Bangladesh. These passport booklets were traditional, handwritten or manual, passports and were compliant with the relevant international laws and regulations in force at the time. Subsequently, additional laws were enacted in Bangladesh in the years that followed to improve the passport application process; enforce the ineligibility to hold multiple valid Bangladeshi passports; citizenship requirement for a passport; etc. Since 1972 a special passport, also known as the India-Bangladesh Special passport, used to be issued to Bangladeshi citizens and Indian nationals resident in West Bengal State and the North-Eastern States of India only. This special passport had a maroon cover. It was valid for travelling between India and Bangladesh only. The issuance of this passport ended in 2013, due to changes in ICAO regulations.

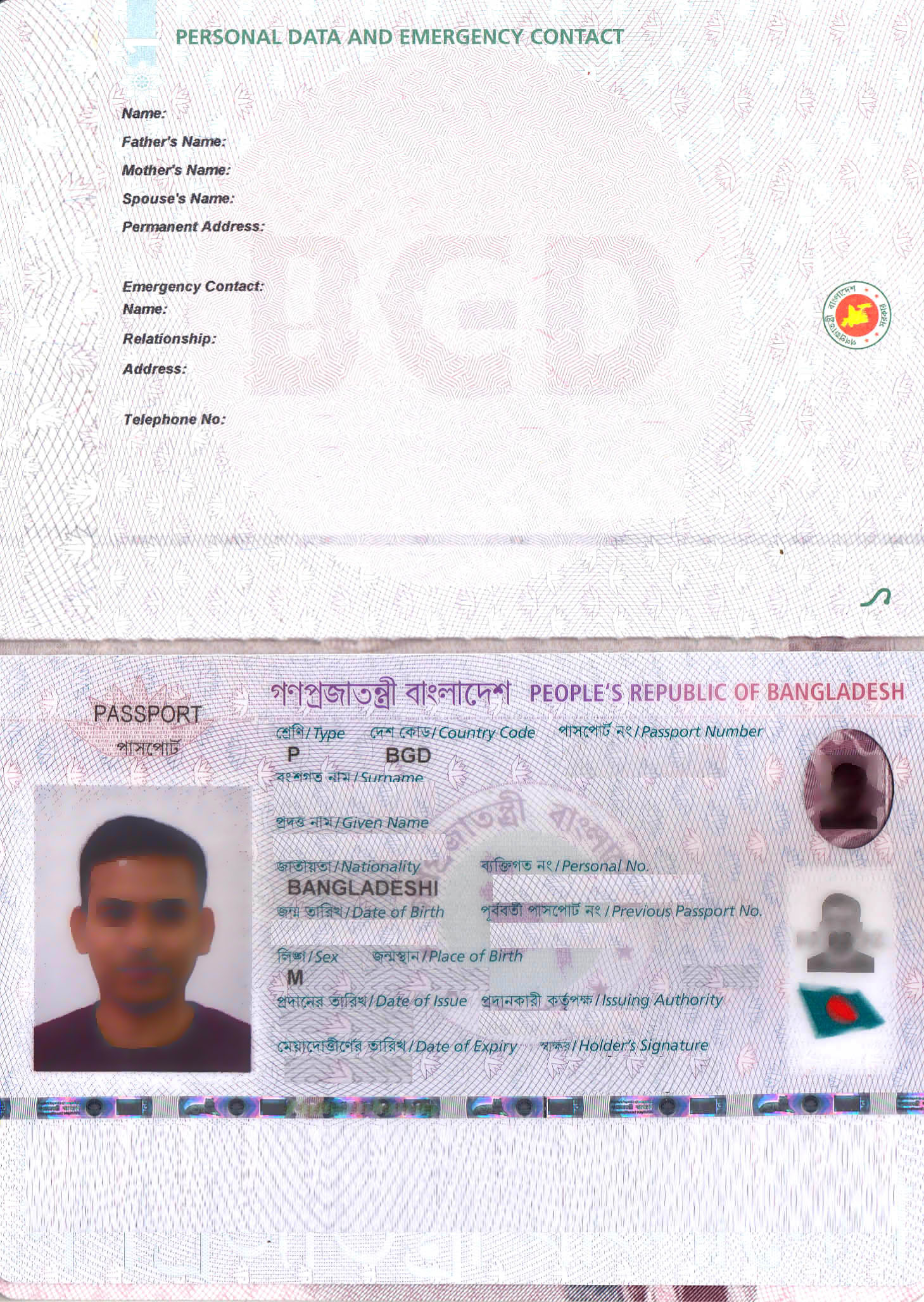
Biographical data page of Bangladesh e-passport

The Department of Immigration and Passports of the Government of Bangladesh used to issue traditional handwritten or manual passports before the introduction of the machine-readable passports. In 2010 Prime Minister Sheikh Hasina, of the Government of Bangladesh, announced a plan to replace over 6.6 million handwritten passports with new biometric machine-readable passports. Following the guidelines of the International Civil Aviation Organization (ICAO), the Bangladeshi government started issuing machine-readable passports (MRP) and machine-readable visas (MRV) in April 2010. However, all traditional handwritten passports were honored as bona fide Bangladesh government-issued travel documents until their expiration date. All traditional handwritten passports were successfully withdrawn from circulation before ICAO's international deadline of November 2015.

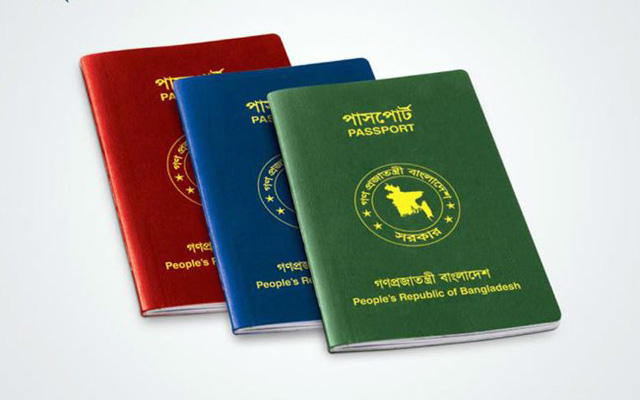
The three types of Bangladeshi passports in 2010

In 2016, the Government of Bangladesh, led by Prime Minister Sheikh Hasina, announced new plans to issue e-passports. The then Home Minister hoped this would ease immigration, travel and visa procedures for Bangladeshi passport holders. The new Bangladeshi e-passport is provided in collaboration with a German company along with multiple e-gates at all major ports of entry. Machine-readable passports are being phased out gradually. E-passports will completely replace all machine-readable passports. However, all machine-readable passports are bona fide and valid travel documents until the expiry date written in them.

Prime Minister Sheikh Hasina inaugurated the distribution of e-passports at an event in the capital's Bangabandhu International Conference Centre on Wednesday, 22 January 2020. The People's Republic of Bangladesh is the first country in South Asia and the 119th country in the world to issue an e-passport for all eligible citizens.

== Types ==
The Government of Bangladesh issues three different types of passports nowadays. These are Diplomatic, Official and regular or ordinary passports.

Type	Image	Description
Ordinary passport (সাধারণ পাসপোর্ট)		Issued to ordinary citizens of Bangladesh for international travel, such as for vacation, study, business trips, etc.
Official passport (সরকারী পাসপোর্ট)		Issued to Bangladesh government employees, government officials and individuals representing the Bangladeshi government on official business. Many visa requirements normally applicable to Bangladeshi citizens are waived for Official passport holders.
Diplomatic passport (কূটনৈতিক পাসপোর্ট)		Issued to Bangladeshi diplomats, top ranking government officials and diplomatic couriers. Unlike Ordinary passport holders, Diplomatic passport holders get visa free entry to many more countries.

Bangladeshi passports issued since January 2020 are all biometric, machine-readable passports (MRP) and e-passports.

== Passport fees ==
E-passport fees in Bangladeshi taka, including all taxes, are as follows:

Booklet Type	Validity	Delivery Type		
Booklet Type	Validity	Regular	Express	Super Express
48 Pages	5 Years	Tk 4,025	Tk 6,325	Tk 8,625
48 Pages	10 Years	Tk 5,750	Tk 8,050	Tk 10,350
64 Pages	5 Years	Tk 6,325	Tk 8,625	Tk 12,075
64 Pages	10 Years	Tk 8,050	Tk 10,350	Tk 13,800

Emergency delivery is only available for passport reissue applicants who don't wish to make any changes to their passport biographical data. The applicable 15% VAT is included in all the fees shown above. E-passport fees can be paid through all government and private banks in Bangladesh using the A-Challan form. Unlike traditional handwritten or manual passports, e-passports and machine-readable passports are not renewed. Instead, the old passport booklet is cancelled and a new passport is issued in its place. This procedure is called "reissue" by the Department of Immigration and Passports.

Machine Readable Passport (MRP) fees in Bangladeshi taka, excluding tax, are as follows:

Type of application	Delivery Type	Fee
New application or relinquished handwritten passport	Express	Tk 6,000
New application or relinquished handwritten passport	Regular	Tk 3,000
New application or relinquished handwritten passport	NOC certificate holder (gets express delivery facility)	Tk 3,000
New application or relinquished handwritten passport	GO certificate holders seeking treatment, Hajj or pilgrimage (get express delivery facility)	Tk 3,000
New application or relinquished handwritten passport	GO certificate holders for official purpose (get express delivery facility)	Free
Passport renewal (reissue)	Express (except NOC or GO holders)	Tk 6,000
Passport renewal (reissue)	Regular	Tk 3,000

15% VAT is applicable on all fees. Passport fees can be paid in cash at any of the following banks in Bangladesh:

1. AB Bank
2. Bank Asia
3. Dhaka Bank
4. One Bank Limited
5. Premier Bank Limited
6. Sonali Bank
7. Trust Bank

The fees can be paid online as well, using a credit card, debit card, or a mobile phone. Bangladeshi mobile financial services such as bKash or Nagad can also be used to make payments for passport fees, especially e-passport fees. Fees can also be paid through the EkPay website or app, where one gets to choose the payment method such as credit card, debit card or Bangladeshi mobile financial services like bKash or Nagad.

== Physical appearance ==
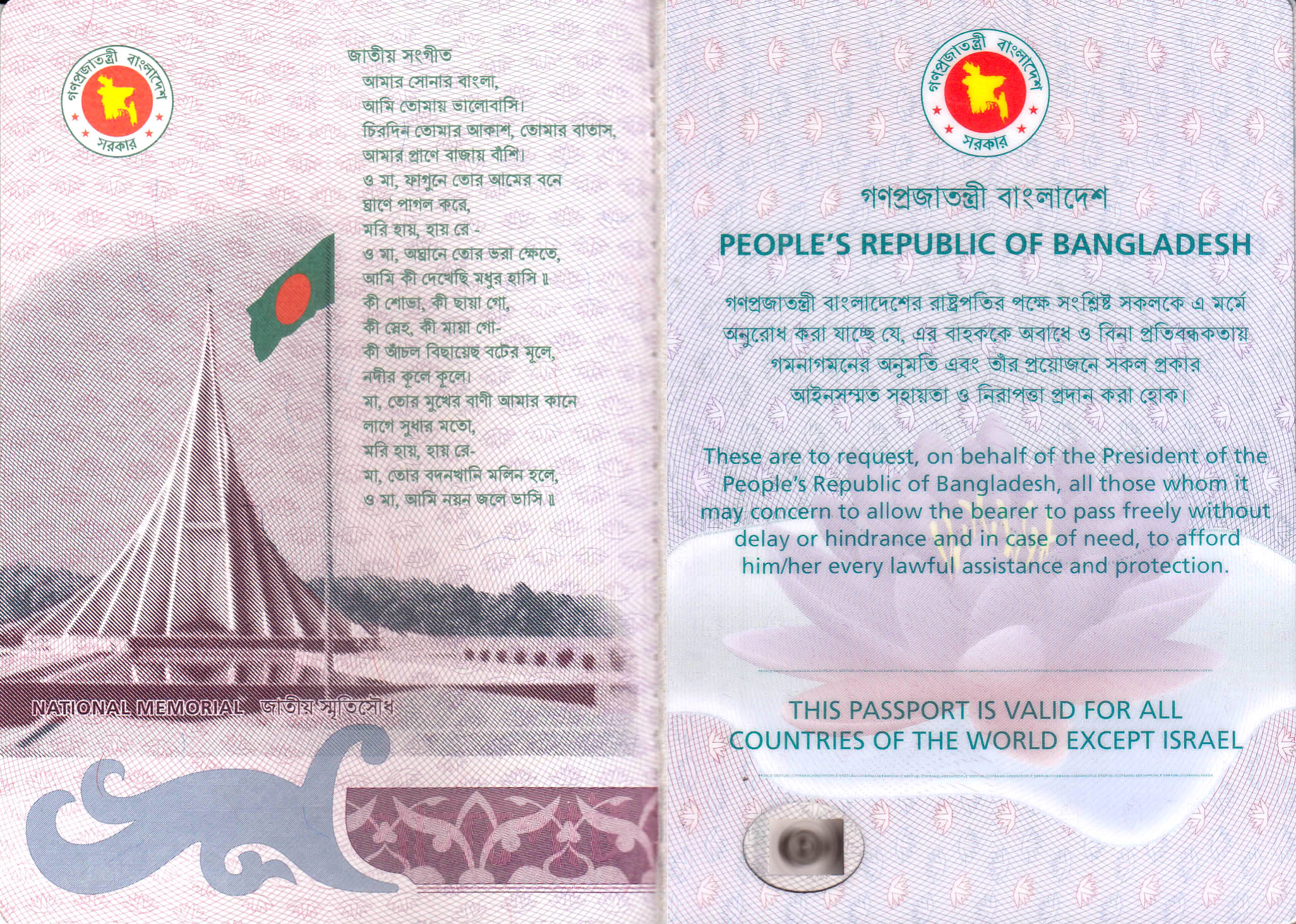
Inside cover of the second generation e-passport of Bangladesh.

Bangladeshi passport covers are dark green, with the Seal of the Government of Bangladesh emblazoned in gold in the centre of the front cover. The word "পাসপোর্ট" (Bengali) and "Passport" (English) are inscribed above the Seal. Below the Seal "গণপ্রজাতন্ত্রী বাংলাদেশ" (Bengali); "People's Republic of Bangladesh" (English); and the international e-passport symbol are inscribed. The standard Bangladesh passport contains 48 pages, however, frequent travellers can opt for a passport containing 64 pages.

=== Passport note ===
The inside cover contains the date and place of issuance of the passport as well as the declaration of the President, addressing the authorities of all other states, identifying the bearer as a citizen of the People's Republic of Bangladesh and requesting that he or she be allowed to pass without hindrance and be treated as per international law. The note inside of the Bangladeshi passports states:

In Bengali:

গণপ্রজাতন্ত্রী বাংলাদেশের রাষ্ট্রপতি পক্ষে সংশ্লিষ্ট সকলকে অনুরোধ করা যাচ্ছে. যে এর বাহককে বিনা প্রতিবন্ধকতায় গমনাগমনের অনুমতি এবং তার প্রয়োজনে সকল প্রকার আইনসম্মত সহায়তা ও নিরাপত্তা প্রদান করা হোক |

In English:

These are to request on behalf of the President of the People's Republic of Bangladesh, all those whom it may concern to allow the bearer to pass freely without delay or hindrance and, in case of need, to afford him/her every lawful assistance and protection.

=== Languages ===
All Bangladesh passports are bilingual, with the text and page numbers of the passports being printed in both Bengali and English. Before machine readable passports were introduced in April 2010 however, older passports were trilingual with all the information inside printed in Bengali, English, and French.

=== Passport holder identity ===
Information about the passport holder is stored on the embedded microprocessor chip in the passport. It is also shown on the biographical page and in page one of the Bangladesh e-passport. The field names, such as name, are written in Bengali (Bangla) and English, with the field values being written in English only. Information regarding faith or occupation is not printed.

The inside cover of a Bangladeshi e-passport has an embossed image of the National Martyrs Mausoleum, with Amar Shonar Bangla, the national anthem of Bangladesh, written in Bengali.

The pre-first page is a chip-enabled plastic card that contains the declaration of the President of the Republic. Underneath this declaration used to be a statement that said that the passport is valid for all countries of the world except Israel. However, from 22 May 2021 newly issued e-passports have a different statement with the Israel travel ban still in place because no diplomatic ties exist between Bangladesh and Israel. The new modified statement now reads "This passport is valid for all countries of the world" and this change was implemented to bring the e-passport in line with international standards as well as ICAO rules and regulations.

However, on 13 April 2025, the Public Security Division of the Home Ministry under the interim government issued a directive referencing the reinstatement of the phrase, which came in the aftermath of the March for Gaza held the previous day.

The back of the pre-first page is the main data page, that contains all the important information. The information printed includes:

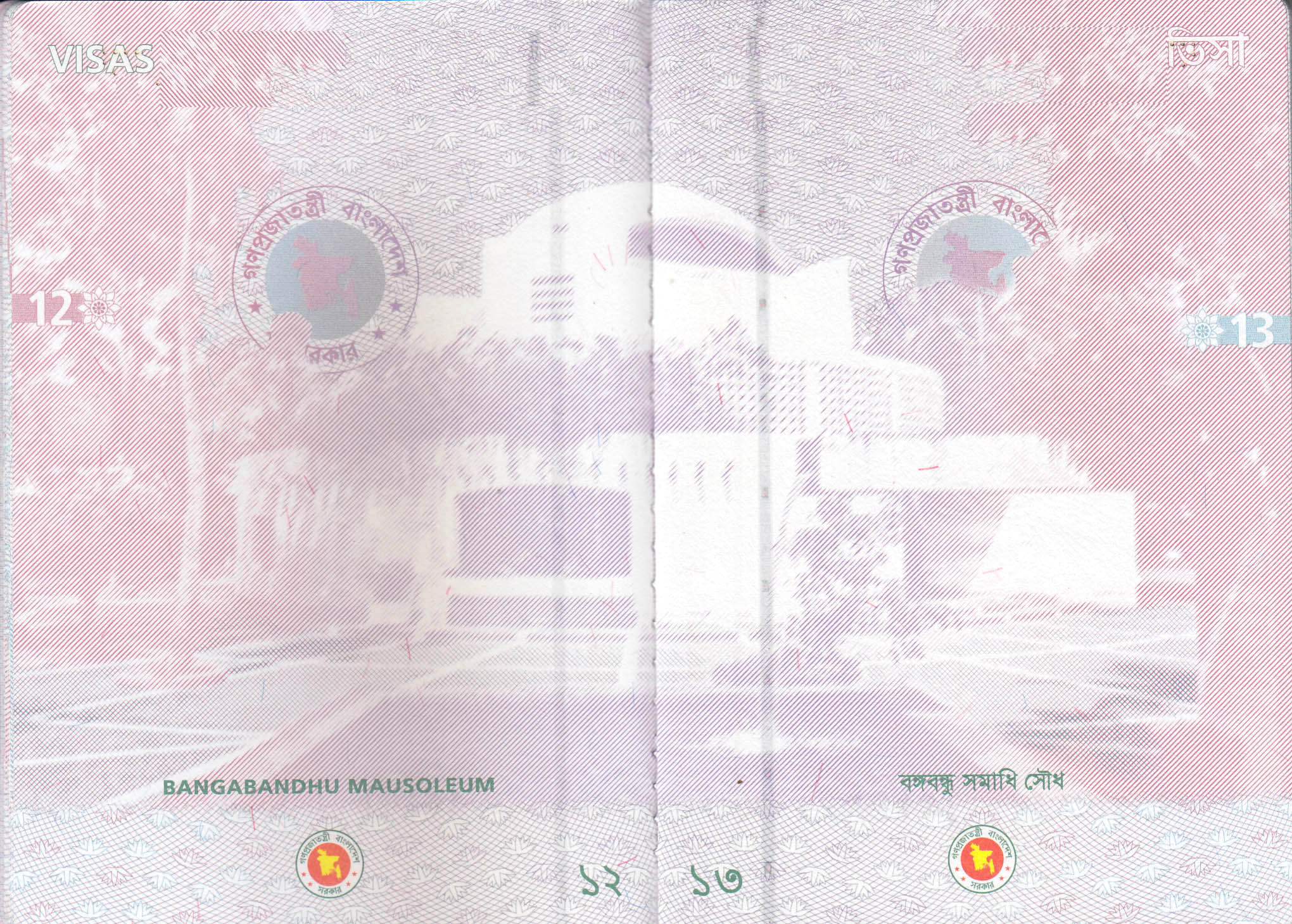
Bangladesh e-passport visa page with Bangabandhu Sheikh Mujibur Rahman's Mausoleum as the background.

- Photo of bearer (বাহক এর ছবি)
- Passport type (শ্রেণী)
- Country code (দেশ কোড)
- Passport no. (পাসপোর্ট নং)
- Surname (বংশগত নাম)
- Given Name (প্রদত্ত নাম)
- Nationality (জাতীয়তা)
- Personal no. (national identification number or birth certificate number) (ব্যক্তিগত নং)
- Date of birth (জন্ম তারিখ)
- Previous passport no. (পূর্ববর্তী পাসপোর্ট নং)
- Sex (লিঙ্গ)
- Place of birth (জন্মস্থান)
- Date of issue (প্রদানের তারিখ)
- Issuing authority (প্রদানকারী কর্তৃপক্ষ)
- Date of expiry (মেয়াদোত্তীর্ণের তারিখ)
- Holder's signature (স্বাক্ষর)

More information regarding the passport holder is encoded using optical character recognition and can only be read by a passport reader. The first page contains additional information in English such as parents' name, legal guardian's name, present address, emergency contact name and number etc. It also contains the passport number printed on the page. This page contains the following information of the bearer:

- Name (নাম)
- Father's name (পিতার নাম)
- Mother's name (মাতার নাম)
- Legal Guardian (আইনানুক অভিভাবক)
- Permanent address (স্থায়ী ঠিকানা)
- Emergency contact (জরুরী যোগাযোগ)
  - Name (নাম)
  - Relationship (সম্পর্ক)
  - Address (ঠিকানা)
  - Telephone no. (টেলিফোন নং)

All information is printed in English using a dot matrix printer and, in the case of the machine readable passport, it is then signed by the appropriate officer of the issuing authority. In the newly issued e-passport, it is laser printed and used to be authenticated with a QR code. From February 6, 2023, the QR Code is no longer printed on the page. Inside the back cover of the e-passport an embossed image of the Jatiyo Sangshad Bhaban, National Parliament of Bangladesh, is displayed with a quotation in English by Louis I Kahn, who is the architect of the complex.

== Visa requirements ==
As of 20 February 2025, Bangladeshi citizens who hold regular or ordinary Bangladeshi passports have visa free or visa on arrival access to 42 countries and territories, ranking the Bangladeshi passport 93rd in terms of travel freedom according to the Henley Passport Index. Bangladeshi citizens who hold Diplomatic passports or Official passports of Bangladesh have visa free or visa on arrival access to many more countries. Previously, Bangladeshi passports were not valid for travel to Rhodesia, Taiwan and South Africa but that has long changed.

Visa requirements for Bangladesh citizens for holders of regular Bangladeshi passports Bangladesh Visa free access Visa on arrival eVisa Both visa on arrival and eVisa available Visa required Admission refused

== Gallery ==
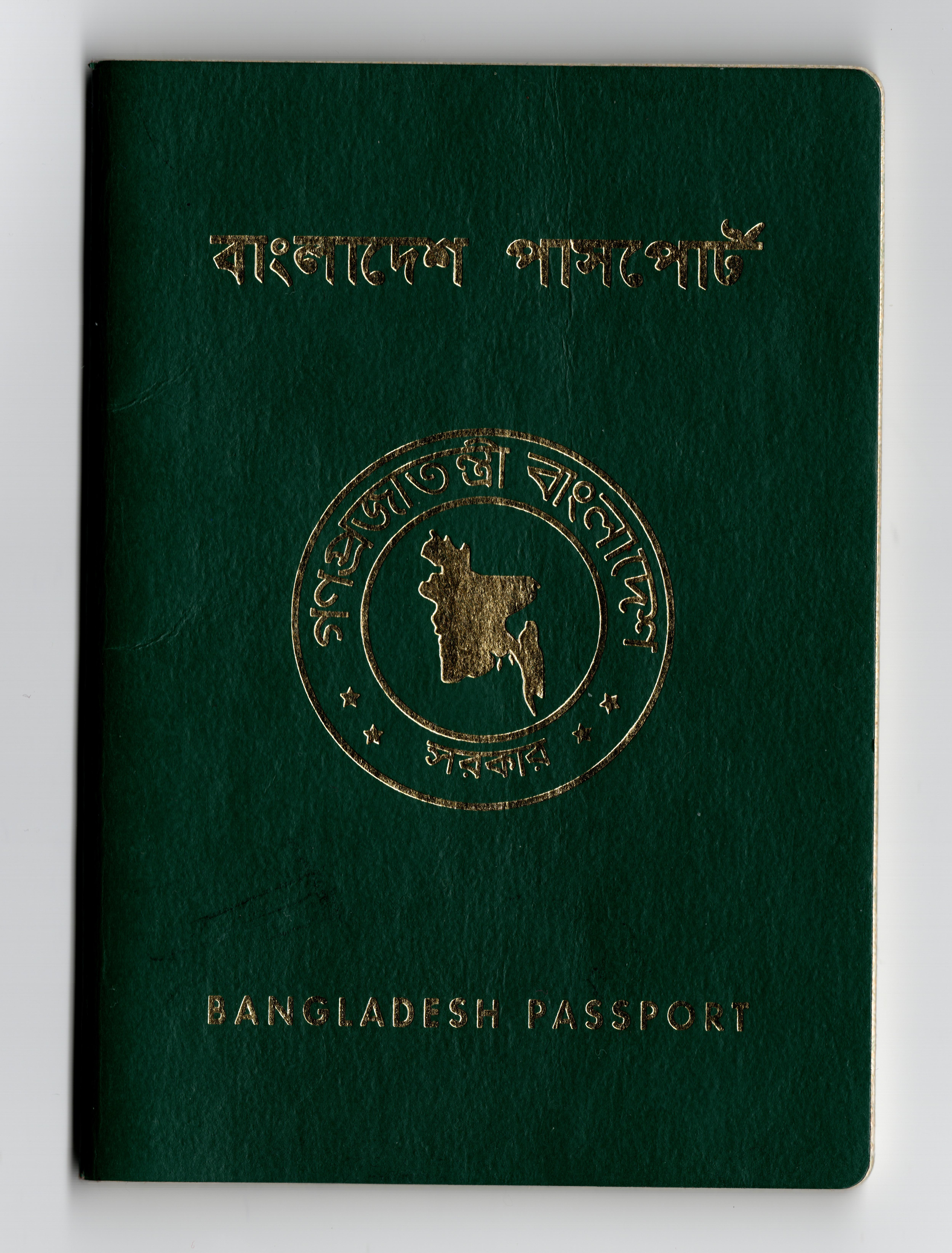
Traditional handwritten Bangladeshi passport, issuing ended in 2010

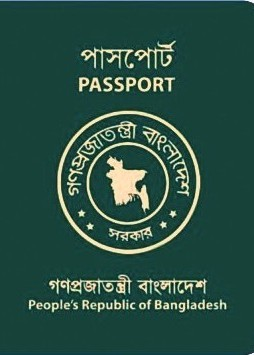
Machine Readable Passport of Bangladesh issued since 2010

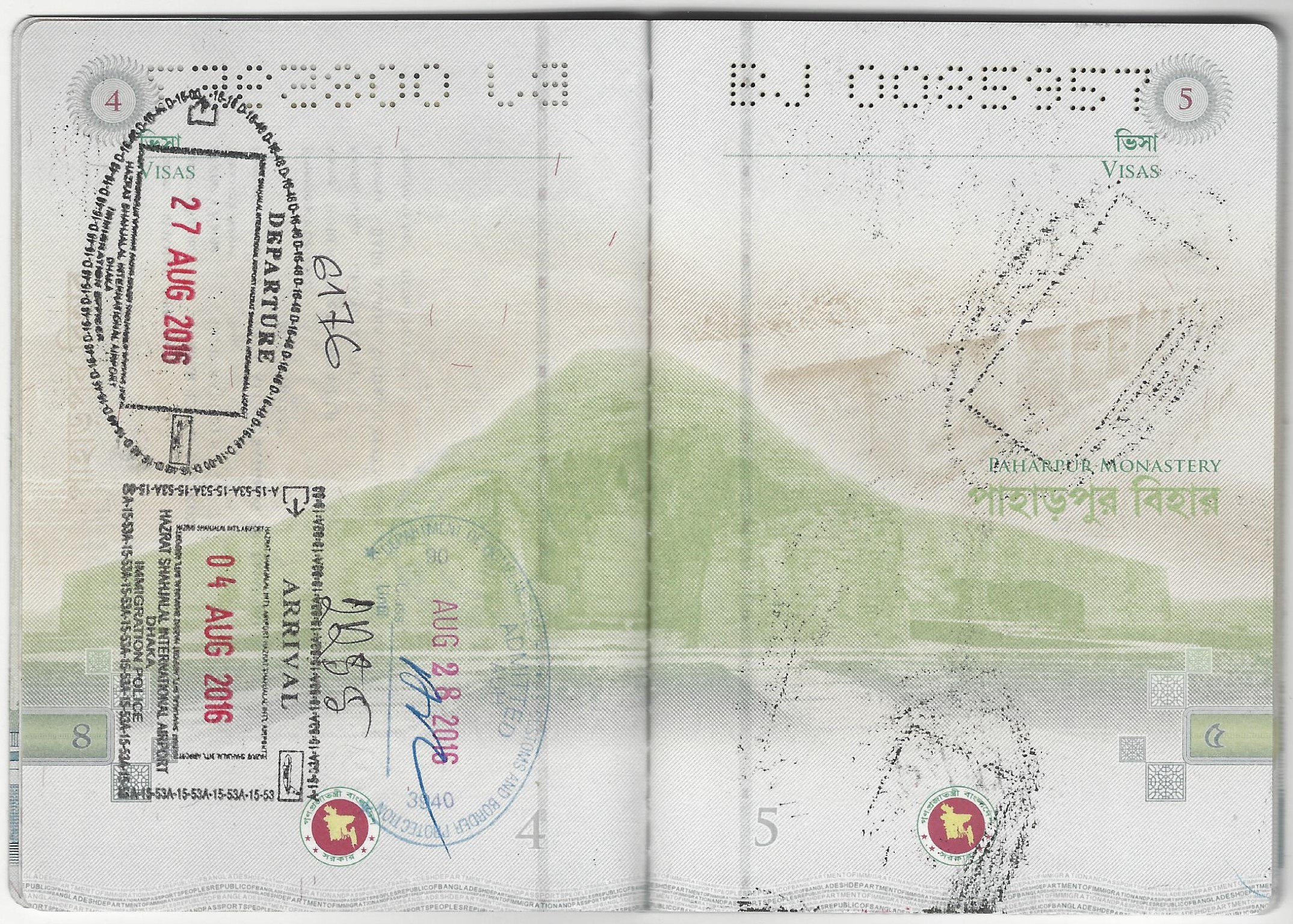
Old machine-readable passport visa page with immigration stamps and, in the background, Paharpur Monastery – a centuries-old UNESCO World Heritage Site

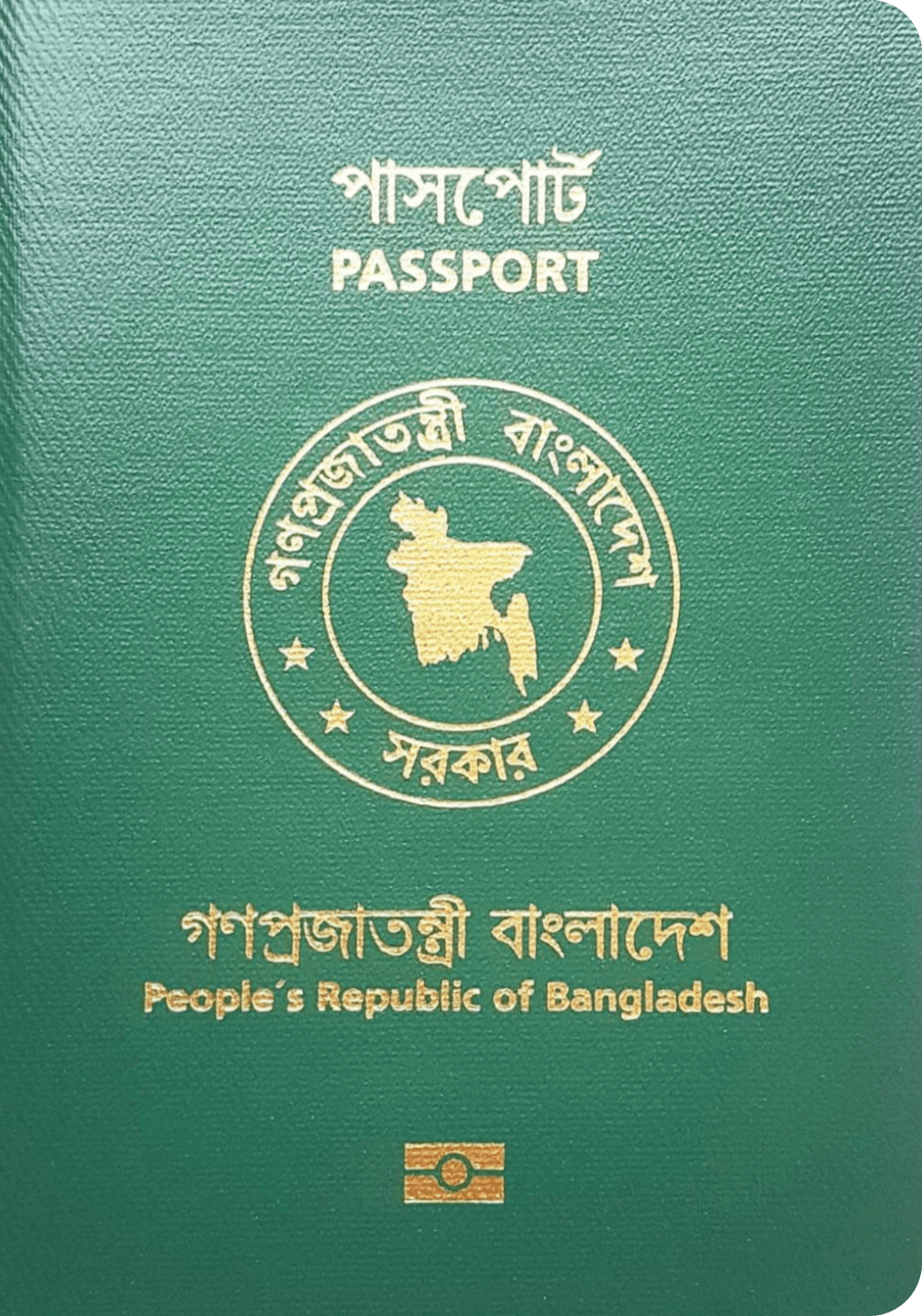
Bangladesh E-passport issued since 2020

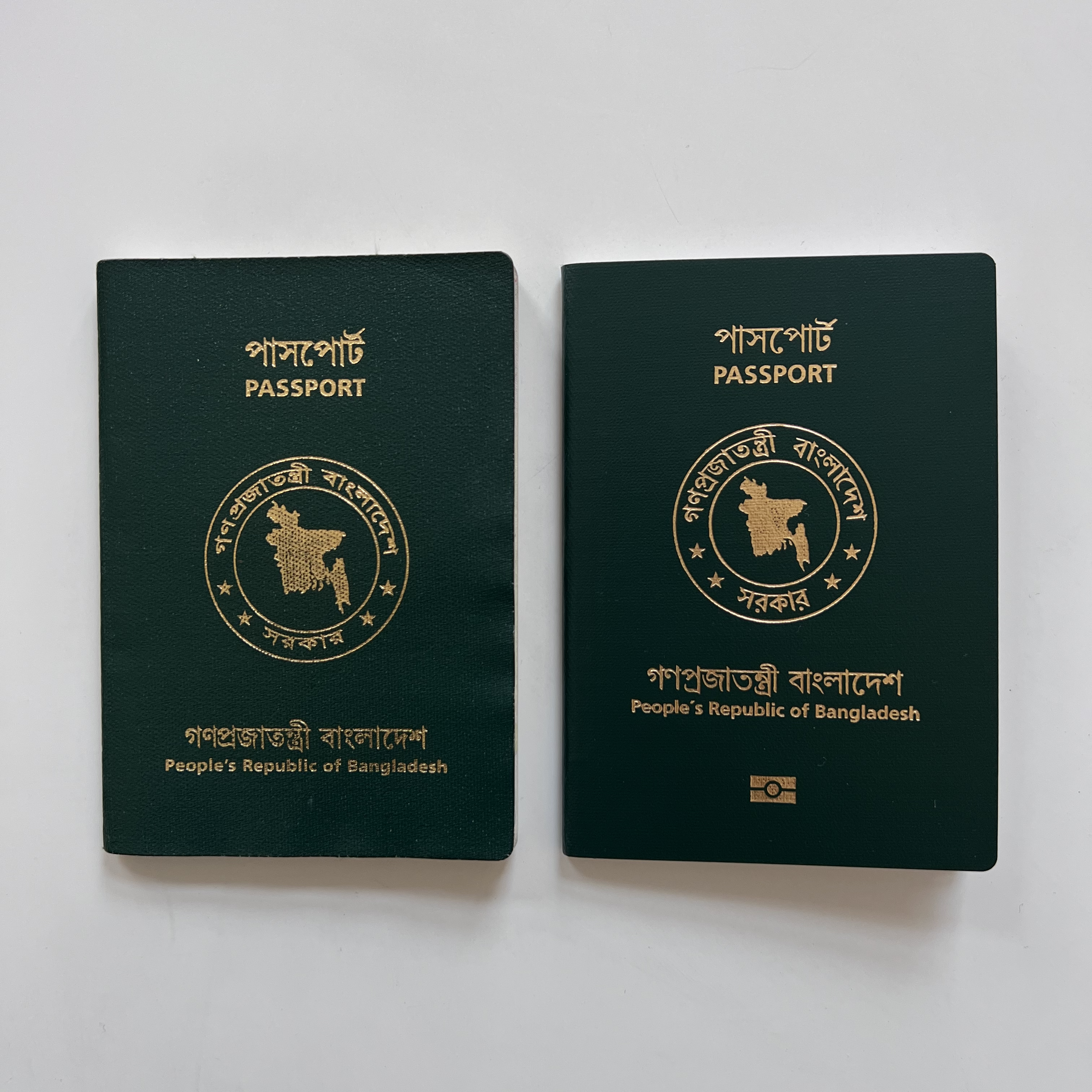
Bangladesh Passport comparison – Machine Readable Passport vs E-Passport

== See also ==
- Visa requirements for Bangladeshi citizens
- Visa policy of Bangladesh
- Bangladeshi nationality law
- Pakistani passport
- Indian Passport
