= Rigon =

Rigon is an Italian surname.

== Geographical distribution ==
As of 2014, 51,3% of all known bearers of the surname Rigon were residents of Italy (frequency 1:10,938), 31,7% of Brazil (1:61,979), 9,07% of the Philippines (1:102,468), 3,76% of France (1:162,007), 0,86% of the United States (1:3,855,946), 0,85% of Australia (1:290,276), 0,53% of Canada (1:635,269), 0,29% of Germany (1:2,515,796), 0,23% of Argentina (1:1,709,737) and 0,19% of Spain (1:2,226,287).

== Notable people ==
- Charles Rigon (born 1996), Brazilian footballer
- Davide Rigon (born 1986), Italian racing driver
- Francesco Rigon (born 1987), Italian lightweight rower
- Francis Rigon (born 1944), French racing cyclist
- Léon Rigon (1885–1979), French equestrian
- Marino Rigon (1925–2017), Italian-Bangladeshi missionary
- Shane Rigon (born 1977), Australian former rugby player
- Stella Rigon (born 1989), Australian footballer
