= Bangladeshi nationality law =

Citizenship Act, 1951 নাগরিকত্ব আইন, ১৯৫১

Jatiya Sangsad
- Long title: An Act to provide for the acquisition and determination of citizenship of Bangladesh
- Citation: Act No. II of 1951
- Territorial extent: Bangladesh
- Enacted by: Constituent Assembly of Pakistan (pre‑1971), continued by Bangladesh
- Signed by: Sir Khawaja Nazimuddin, Governor-General of Pakistan
- Signed: 18 February 1951
- Commenced: 18 February 1951
- Administered by: Ministry of Home Affairs

Legislative history
- Passed: 13 February 1951

Amended by
- Bangladesh (Adaptation of Existing Laws) Order, 1972; Bangladesh Citizenship (Temporary Provisions) Order, 1972; Bangladesh Citizenship (Second) Order, 1978; The Bangladesh Citizenship (Amendment) Act, 2009

Related legislation
- The Foreigners Act, 1946
- Status: In force

The nationality law of Bangladesh governs the issues of citizenship and nationality of the People's Republic of Bangladesh. The law regulates the nationality and citizenship status of all people who live in Bangladesh as well as all people who are of Bangladeshi descent. It allows the children of expatriates, foreigners as well as residents in Bangladesh, to examine their citizenship status and, if necessary, apply for and obtain citizenship of Bangladesh.

The primary law relating to Bangladeshi citizenship is The Citizenship Act, 1951, originally the Pakistan Citizenship Act 1951, later amended by a number of legislative orders introduced by the Government of Bangladesh.

Bangladesh was previously ruled by the British Empire, and local residents were British subjects and British protected persons. Although modern-day Bangladesh (then East Bengal) became a province of the Dominion of Pakistan during the partition of 1947. Bangladeshis no longer hold British nationality, they continue to have favoured status when residing in the United Kingdom; as Commonwealth citizens, Bangladeshis are eligible to vote in UK elections and serve in public office there.

== Citizenship ==
=== Upon the founding of the state ===
The territory that is modern-day Bangladesh was once a part of Pakistan called East Bengal subsequently becoming East Pakistan before Bangladesh's declaration of independence in 1971. Previously, Pakistan, India, and Bangladesh (then East Bengal) had been part of the British Empire until independence from Britain and the partition of India and Pakistan into two separate countries in 1947. Before the advent of Bangladeshi nationality law, British nationality law and the Citizenship Law of Pakistan would have applied.

Upon the founding of the state, Bangladeshi law granted citizenship to persons who were permanent residents of the territories that became Bangladesh on 25 March 1971. The wording of the order makes separate mention of those whose father or grandfather were born in the territory and others, but it is unclear that there is any distinction in law between those groups. The law also describes Bengalis who were in West Pakistan during the 1971 war and facing obstacles over returning as permanent residents eligible for Bangladeshi citizenship.

=== Commonwealth citizenship ===
Bangladeshi citizens are also Commonwealth citizens by default as well.

=== Jus sanguinis ===
According to the Citizenship Act 1951, one method of acquiring Bangladeshi nationality is via jus sanguinis (citizenship by right of blood). This means one may acquire citizenship regardless of whether they were born on Bangladeshi sovereign territory or not. Bangladeshi citizenship is provided primarily jus sanguinis, or through bloodline, irrespective of the place or the legitimacy of the birth. Therefore, any child born to a Bangladeshi woman illegitimately outside Bangladeshi soil would still be eligible to be a Bangladeshi citizen, whereas a child born to two non-nationals in Bangladesh would not. This method is restricted if the child's parents also acquired their nationality through naturalisation or by descent.

The Act states, however, that for this to be the case, if the parent from whom the citizenship is to be inherited obtained their Bangladeshi citizenship by descent (rather than birth, for example), then the birth must be registered at the nearest Bangladeshi Embassy, High Commission, or Mission.

=== Jus soli ===
Citizenship is acquired jus soli (citizenship by right of birth within the territory) or at birth, when the identity or nationality of the parents is unknown. In this regard, the child is assumed to be born to Bangladeshi nationals, and hence, given citizenship upon birth. However, this does not apply to the children of enemy aliens born in Bangladesh, and it also does not apply to people residing illegally in Bangladesh or refugees in Bangladesh. Enemy aliens are people who do not recognize or refuse to recognize the sovereignty, territorial integrity, and independence of the People's Republic of Bangladesh. Enemy aliens are also people whose country of citizenship is, or was, at war with Bangladesh since the declaration of independence in March 1971 by the father of the nation, Sheikh Mujibur Rahman. Jus soli citizenship is conferred upon some Urdu-speaking people of Bangladesh since May 2008 by a High Court verdict (see below).

=== Naturalization ===
Naturalization is permitted by the citizenship law of Bangladesh. Any adult of good character who is married to a Bangladeshi and residing legally in Bangladesh for a period of five years; competent in the Bengali language; and intending to reside in Bangladesh can apply for naturalisation. Naturalization may be conferred categorically or without certain rights or privileges, such as the right to stand in parliamentary elections as a candidate. It is also conferred at the discretion of the Government of Bangladesh. Any person who is a citizen of a nation where Bangladeshis are not allowed to naturalise (for instance, Saudi Arabia) is not eligible for naturalisation. Naturalization of a foreigner does not automatically extend to their foreign children. However, they may apply as soon as the naturalised person has taken the citizenship oath of allegiance.

If denied, a person can appeal against the decision within thirty days, where they will be heard. They cannot appeal if citizenship is conferred without certain rights or privileges. If accepted, a naturalised citizen must take an oath of allegiance within thirty days of the grant. A person is considered naturalised only after the oath.

=== Dual citizenship ===
As of February 2023, dual citizenship is permitted under certain circumstances where the person is a citizen of selected 101 countries. Such dual citizens of Bangladesh can apply for a Dual Nationality Certificate, which makes it legal to use a foreign passport; however, people are not prosecuted for not applying for such a certificate. It is also possible to enter Bangladesh as a person of Bangladeshi origin, or a spouse or child of a person of Bangladeshi origin, via a No Visa Required (NVR) seal, stamp, or sticker on their foreign passports. An eligible person can apply for the NVR stamp/sticker at any Bangladeshi mission overseas. NVR exceptions include citizens of SAARC countries.

Bangladeshi citizens can get dual citizenship of 101 other countries, along with the citizenship of Bangladesh.

| Since | Countries |
|---|---|
| 17 March 2008 | United Kingdom |
| 23 September 2008 | all countries of (European Union) Europe, United States, Canada |
| 22 January 2012 | Brunei, Hong Kong, Japan, Malaysia, Singapore, South Korea |
| 27 February 2023 | Algeria, Argentina, Bahamas, Barbados, Bolivia, Botswana, Brazil, Burundi, Central African Republic, Chile, Colombia, Congo, Cuba, Dominica, Dominican Republic, Ecuador, Egypt, Eritrea, Fiji, Gambia, Ghana, Grenada, Guyana, Haiti, Jamaica, Kenya, Liberia, Libya, Mauritius, Morocco, Peru, Rwanda, Saint Lucia, Saint Kitts and Nevis, Saint Vincent and the Grenadines, Sierra Leone, South Africa, Sudan, Suriname, Trinidad and Tobago, Tunisia, Uruguay, Venezuela |

=== Citizenship by investment ===
People who invest in Bangladesh can acquire permanent residency status by investing a minimum of US$75,000 in non-repatriable funds. In addition to many other benefits, permanent residency allows a person to stay in Bangladesh for as long as they want, as well as enter and exit Bangladesh unlimited times without requiring a visa. Citizenship is available by investing a minimum of US$500,000 or by transferring US$1,000,000 in non-repatriable funds to any recognised financial institution in Bangladesh. Although the initial investment to obtain permanent residency or citizenship is non-repatriable, profits, dividends, and salaries are repatriable overseas. Under its export-oriented, private-sector-led growth strategy and liberal industrial policy, Bangladesh offers potential investors and entrepreneurs generous opportunities, tax exemptions, and many other incentives for investment.

=== Honorary citizenship ===
The government of Bangladesh reserves the right to grant honorary citizenship to foreign nationals who make exemplary contributions to society in Bangladesh or obtain outstanding achievements for Bangladesh, such as the honour conferred to Father Marino Rigon or Sir Gordon Greenidge. Gordon Greenidge was appointed the head coach of the Bangladesh national cricket team in 1997. His guidance helped the Bangladesh men's cricket team win the 1997 ICC Trophy, beating 22 other nations, which also ensured qualification to the 1999 ICC Cricket World Cup. Participation in their first-ever cricket world cup changed Bangladesh cricket forever and led to Test cricket status for the Bangladesh national cricket team in 2000. Gordon Greenidge was conferred honorary citizenship of Bangladesh by the Prime Minister, Sheikh Hasina, for these outstanding achievements of winning the 1997 ICC Trophy and simultaneously qualifying for the cricket world cup.

== Travel freedom ==
A (regular or ordinary) Bangladeshi passport

Visa requirements for Bangladeshi citizens

As of 22 May 2018, Bangladeshi citizens had visa-free or visa-on-arrival access to 41 countries and territories, ranking the Bangladeshi passport 94th in the world according to the Visa Restrictions Index.

== Relinquishing nationality ==
Nationality can be revoked only if it was conferred upon a person by naturalisation, unless the person wilfully surrenders citizenship.

It can be revoked if the naturalised alien provided false information in his/her application. It can also be revoked if the person is sentenced to prison for at least a year or fined at least BDT 1,000 (about US$14) within five years of the naturalisation, or if the person loses contact with Bangladesh for at least seven years. Defection by trade and communication with an enemy at war or remaining a citizen of an enemy state at war will also result in denaturalisation.

== Controversial issues ==
=== Ghulam Azam ===
Ghulam Azam was a prominent leader of Jamaat-e-Islami during the Liberation War of Bangladesh. At the time of the war in 1971, he relocated to Lahore, Pakistan, where he held a Pakistani passport. For several years following the war, Azam repeatedly applied for Bangladeshi citizenship, but his applications were unsuccessful. In 1978, he returned to Bangladesh on a tourist visa, which he continued to renew for 16 years, remaining in the country under this status until 1994.

During the government of Khaleda Zia, Azam eventually obtained Bangladeshi citizenship and a Bangladeshi passport. His citizenship status became the subject of legal controversy, with the High Court ruling that he was a citizen of Bangladesh by descent and domicile under the Bangladesh Citizenship Order, a decision later upheld by the Supreme Court.

Azam's role during the war and his post-war activities, his return to Bangladesh and subsequent citizenship, as well as his conviction in the incitement in committing genocide, have been a focal point of significant public debate and legal scrutiny.

=== Stranded Pakistanis ===
Following Bangladesh's independence from Pakistan in 1971, approximately half a million "stranded Pakistanis," commonly referred to as Biharis, were left in the newly formed state. These individuals, primarily of Urdu-speaking descent and tracing their heritage to the Bihar region of India, found themselves in a complex political and legal situation.

Under the Bangladesh Citizenship Order of 1972, Biharis who identified themselves as Bangladeshis were granted citizenship. However, those who declared allegiance to Pakistan or were listed as refugees by the Red Cross were considered non-nationals. Despite assurances from the governments of both Bangladesh and Pakistan, these individuals remained stateless for many years.

It wasn't until May 2008 that the Bangladesh High Court granted jus soli citizenship to all Urdu-speaking people born and residing in Bangladesh after 1971, recognizing them as full citizens.

=== Rohingya people ===
Several hundred thousand Rohingya refugees fled Myanmar to Bangladesh, including approximately 200,000 in 1978, following the Burmese military's "Operation Dragon King" in Arakan (now Rakhine State). This large-scale exodus put considerable pressure on Bangladesh, which was concerned about Myanmar's attempts to label the Rohingyas as Bangladeshi nationals.

In an effort to counter Myanmar's claims and clarify the status of the Rohingya refugees, the Bangladesh government amended the Bangladesh Citizenship Order in 1982, officially designating all Rohingya refugees as non-nationals. This legal change was intended to prevent their forced repatriation to Bangladesh by Myanmar, which has historically refused to recognize the Rohingya as citizens or one of its ethnic groups.

Despite repeated international efforts to resolve the issue, most Rohingya refugees remain unable to return to Myanmar due to ongoing persecution and fear of the military regime.

== See also ==
- Pakistani nationality law
- Bangladeshi passport
