= National identity card (Bangladesh) =

National identity card of Bangladesh

National Identity Card Bengali: জাতীয় পরিচয়পত্র
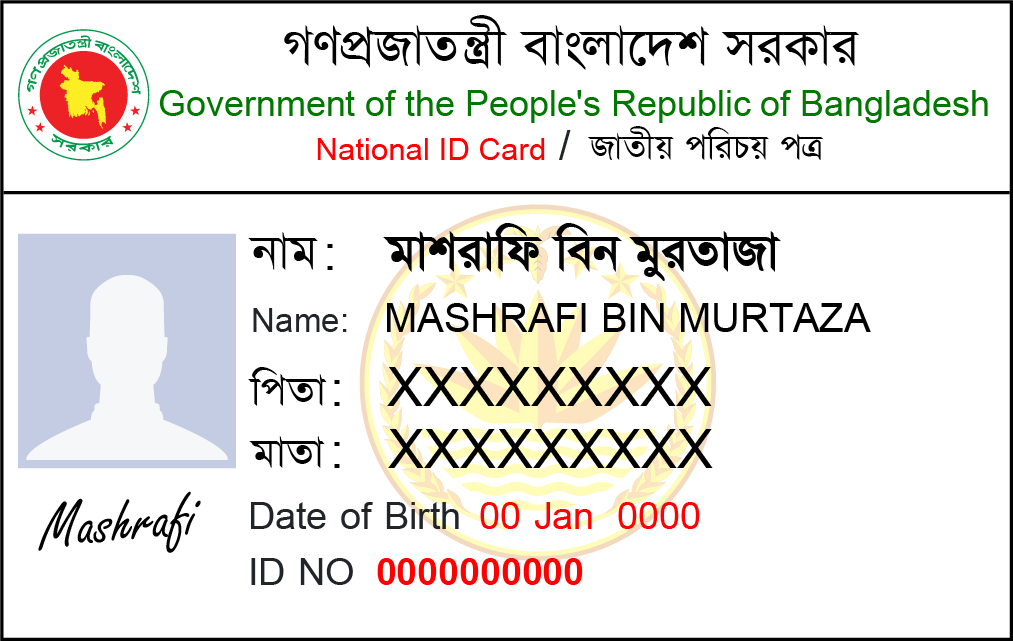
- Front of paper specimen card

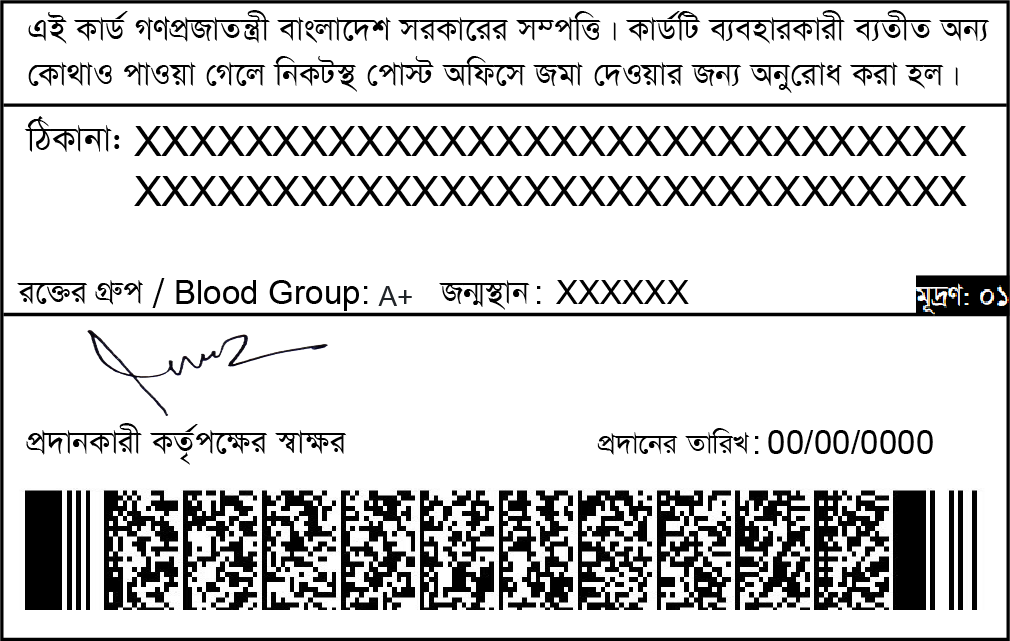
- Reverse of paper specimen card
- Type: Identity card
- Issued by: National Identity Registration Wing (NIDW), Ministry of Home Affairs
- First issued: 22 July 2006
- Purpose: Electronic identification
- Valid in: Bangladesh
- Eligibility: 16 years of age (Bangladeshi citizen)
- Expiration: 15 years from the date of issuance

Smart NID card
- Key people: Brig. Gen. Sulatnunzzam M. Salehuddin
- Launched: 2 October 2016
- Budget: ৳883 crore (US$72 million)
- Website: nidw.gov.bd

The National Identity Card (Bengali: জাতীয় পরিচয়পত্র) or NID card is an identity card issued to every Bangladeshi citizen upon turning 16 years of age by Bangladesh Election Commission (EC). The NID is also a biometric, microchip embedded smart identity card. Bangladeshi citizens are required by law to possess a NID for multiple essential public services & private services in Bangladesh. Initially, paper-based laminated NID cards were issued in 2006. Then, the paper-based laminated NID cards were replaced by the Smart NID cards in 2016. This was done to ensure security for the cardholder as well as prevent counterfeiting and fraudulence. Bangladesh government provides the Smart NID card with zero cost for all above 14 years Bangladeshi citizens.

== History ==
Biometric identification has existed in Bangladesh since 2008. Bangladesh Election Commission introduced paper laminated National Identity cards through its project named Preparation of Electoral Roll with Photograph (PERP), a UNDP led donor funded project. The first National Project Director was Brigadier General Shahadat Hossain Chowdhury. The project was designed for the preparation of the electoral roll with photographs for the Ninth Parliamentary Election held in December 2008. A demographic and biometric database was created for 81.3 million Bangladeshi citizens who were eligible to be voters. All Bangladeshis who are 18 years of age or older are issued identity cards and included in a central biometric database, which is used by the Bangladesh Election Commission to oversee the electoral procedure in Bangladesh. Before 2016, only normal identity cards were issued which only included the ID holder's name; father's and mother's names; date of birth; ID number; photo; thumb and index fingerprints; and signature. These paper-based laminated NID cards were easy to counterfeit. However, starting in October 2016, they were replaced by biometric, microchip-embedded, smart identity cards in order to ensure security for the cardholder as well as prevent counterfeiting and fraudulence. The smart NID cards include all ten fingerprints in addition to other biometric and identity information.

On 12 June 2023, the Home Ministry of Bangladesh gained authority to issue NID cards and the Election Commission lost its authority under the law of National Identity Registration Act, 2023.

On 9 September 2025, Election secretary Akhtar Ahmed said “Citizens who are 16 years or older can apply for NID registration. This allows us to preserve preliminary data in advance, and they will receive NIDs.”

== Smart National Identity Card ==
The National Identity Registration Wing (NIDW) of the Bangladesh Election Commission introduced the Smart National Identity Card in October 2016. This card has an integrated circuit embedded in it, and it is also known as a "chip-based card" or "smart NID card" in Bangladesh. It is a pocket-sized plastic card, almost the size of a credit card, with an embedded integrated circuit storing all the data. To maintain the security of the smart card, twenty-five international certifications and standards have been ensured. Since they are machine-readable cards, smart cards have additional safety measures to prevent forgery.

== Data breach ==
Over 50 million Bangladesh citizens' NID data were leaked online on 27 June 2023, which includes names, addresses, phone numbers, and National ID numbers, and was first reported on 8 July 2023. The leak was believed to have come from the National Identity Registration System (NIDS), a government database that contains the personal information of all Bangladeshi citizens. The leak is a major security breach, as it can be used by criminals to commit identity theft, fraud, or other crimes. The government started investigating the leak, and has promised to take steps to protect the privacy of Bangladeshi citizens on the same day of reporting.

== Key facilities ==
The following facilities and services are available to citizens with the Bangladeshi smart NID card:

- Vote (after 18)
- Citizens' rights and benefit
- Driving license
- Passport
- Property land buying and selling
- Open Bangladeshi bank accounts
- Account Check
- Bank loan support
- Government pensions
- Government financial aid or support
- BIN facility
- Share-BO account maintainers
- Business trade license
- Vehicle registration
- Insurance schemes
- Marriage registration
- E-passports
- E-governance
- Gas and electricity connections
- Mobile connect
- Health cards
- E-cash
- Bank transactions
- Students' admission facilities
- Mobile financial services
- E-wallet
- GPS Tracking

== Eligibility ==
A candidate applying for a new voter must fulfill certain conditions. The key eligibility for NID application are:

- Applicant must be a citizen of Bangladesh.
- Must be at least 16 years of age or older.
- Must be a person who has not previously registered National Identity Card.

== Requirements ==
Updating the list of eligible voters is an ongoing process under the election commission. Bangladeshi citizens who have frequently lived in an area and are 18 years or above, but not yet registered as a voter, may register. At the time of enrollment, they need the following supporting documents in addition to the application form attested by ward councillor or union council member:

- SSC or equivalent certificate
- Birth certificate
- Passport, driving license, or TIN certificate (if available)
- Utility bill copy, house rent receipt, or holding tax receipt (as proof of address)
- Citizenship certificate (if applicable)
- Attested photocopy of Father, mother, husband, or wife's NID
- Has to be physically present at EC premises for photo and biometric data collection
