= Visa requirements for Bangladeshi citizens =

Visa requirement policy for Bangladeshi citizen

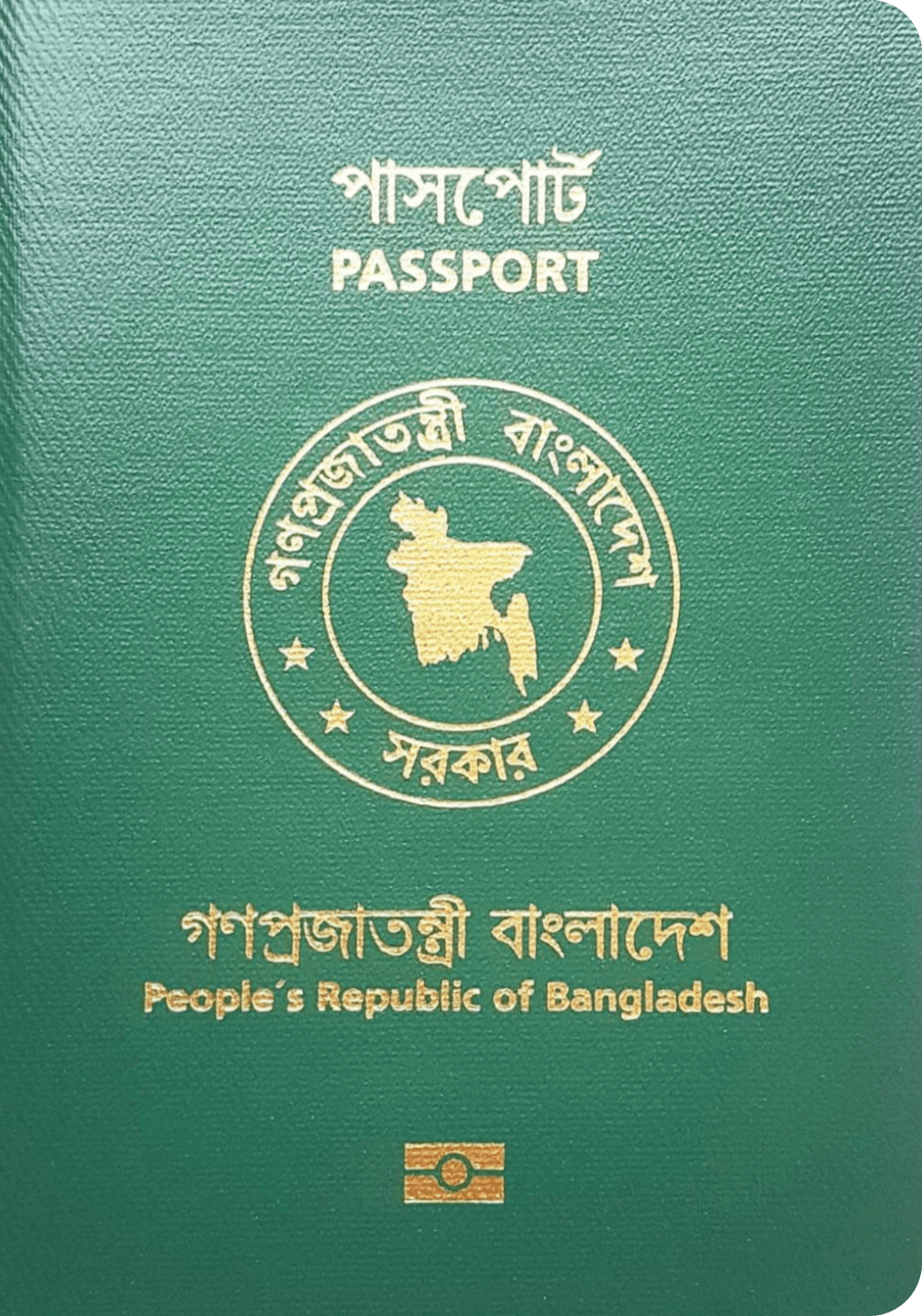
A (regular or ordinary) e-passport of Bangladesh

Visa requirements for Bangladeshi citizens are administrative entry restrictions imposed on citizens of Bangladesh by the authorities of other countries.

As of 2026, Bangladeshi citizens have visa-free or visa on arrival access to 36 countries and territories, ranking the Bangladeshi passport 95th in the world according to the Henley Passport Index.

Bangladeshi citizens who hold diplomatic passports or official passports of Bangladesh have visa free or visa on arrival access to many more countries.

== Visa requirements map ==
Visa requirements for Bangladeshi citizens holding ordinary passports Bangladesh Visa not required eVisa Visa on arrival Visa available both on arrival or online Visa required Admission refused.

== Visa requirements ==
Country	Visa requirement	Allowed stay	Notes
Afghanistan	eVisa	30 days	Visa is not required in case born in Afghanistan or can proof that one of their parents is a national of Afghanistan or born in Afghanistan.; e-Visa : Visitors must arrive at Kabul International (KBL).
Albania	eVisa		e-Visa available for holders of a valid Schengen visa; Visa not required who have valid Used visa or residence permit from any USA, UK or Schengen countries. (T-chy)
Algeria	Visa required		
Andorra	Visa required		Visa not required for the Schengen residence card holders.
Angola	eVisa		
Antigua and Barbuda	eVisa	30 days	US$100 visa waiver fee applies.
Argentina	Visa required		
Armenia	Visa required		Ordinary passport holders can only obtain visas by invitation only.
Australia	Online Visa required		May apply online (Online Visitor e600 visa).; Allows a stay of 3, 6 or 12 months.
Austria	Visa required		
Azerbaijan	Visa required		Visa on arrival for up to 90 days for valid residence permit holders of any country in the GCC (Bahrain, Kuwait, Oman, Qatar, Saudi Arabia and the UAE).
Bahamas	Visa not required	4 weeks	
Bahrain	eVisa / Visa on arrival	14 days	
Barbados	Visa not required	6 months	
Belarus	Visa required		
Belgium	Visa required		
Belize	Visa required		No Visa required for holders of US, Canada or Schenzen multiple entry visas.
Benin	eVisa	30 days	Must have an international vaccination certificate.
Bhutan	Visa on arrival		As of 2024, Bangladeshi tourists will have to pay $15 (down from $100) per night for staying in Bhutan under the Sustainable Development Fees (SDF).
Bolivia	Online Visa	30 days	
Bosnia and Herzegovina	Visa required		
Botswana	eVisa	3 months	
Brazil	Visa required		No visa required for Diplomatic and Official Passport holders.
Brunei	Visa required		No visa required for Diplomatic and Official Passport holders.
Bulgaria	Visa required		
Burkina Faso	eVisa		
Burundi	Visa on arrival	1 month	From December 2021, passengers of all countries that required visa, can now obtain visa on arrival at Bujumbura International Airport, and all land borders.
Cambodia	eVisa / Visa on arrival		
Cameroon	eVisa		
Canada	Visa required		Visa is not required if holding a permanent residency card from the United States.
Cape Verde	Visa required		Starting 1 January 2026, Cape Verde is suspending their VoA facility for 96 countries, including Bangladesh.
Central African Republic	Visa required		
Chad	Visa required		
Chile	Visa required		No visa required for Diplomatic and Official Passport holders.
China	Visa required		Visa-free transit for up to 24 hours. Domestic travel through multiple Chinese airports permitted.; Port visa (visa on arrival) for the Special Economic Zones (SEZ) of Shenzhen, Zhuhai, or Xiamen.; The SEZ port visa is intended for tourism, business, trade, transit, visits, and other non-employment purposes.; 5-day port visa for Shenzhen if arriving at Luohu Port, Huanggang Port Control Point, Fuyong Ferry Terminal or Shekou Passenger Terminal. The duration of stay starts from the next day of arrival.; 3-day port visa for Zhuhai if entering via Gongbei Port of Entry, Hengqin Port or Jiuzhou Port. The duration of stay starts from the next day of arrival.; 3-day port visa for Xiamen if entering via Xiamen Gaoqi International Airport. The duration of stay starts from the next day of arrival.; Port visa (visa on arrival) is also available for travellers who need to enter China urgently but are unable to apply for a visa in time, for the following reasons: business activities, visits and exchanges; investment and entrepreneurship; private affairs (such as civil affairs, lawsuits, marriage, etc.); visiting relatives; Other urgent humanitarian needs (such as funerals, visiting critically ill patients, or other urgent medical needs.); This policy is only intended for urgent travel needs and is not suitable for general visits or tourism.; To avail of the port visa policy, relevant supporting documents (such as an invitation letter) must be provided to attest to the urgency of the travel needs.; No visa required for Diplomatic and Official Passport holders.
Colombia	Online Visa		
Comoros	Visa on arrival	45 days	
Republic of the Congo	Visa required		
Democratic Republic of the Congo	eVisa	7 days	
Costa Rica	Visa required		Bangladeshi nationals with a multi-entry visa or permanent residency from the United States of America, Canada, or any member country of the European Union may enter Costa Rica without a visa.
Côte d'Ivoire	eVisa	3 months	e-Visa holders must arrive via Port Bouet Airport.
Croatia	Visa required		
Cuba	Visa required		Visa must be obtained in advance in lieu of a tourist card.
Cyprus	Visa required		
Czech Republic	Visa required		
Denmark	Visa required		
Djibouti	eVisa	90 days	
Dominica	Visa not required	6 months	
Dominican Republic	Visa required		
Ecuador	Visa required		
Egypt	Visa required		Obtainable at any port of entry, and only to those who have valid used visas or residence permits from Japan, Canada, Australia, New Zealand, the United States, the United Kingdom and European countries of the Schengen area on their passports.; As of 2026, transit visas are mandatory for Bangladeshi travellers.
El Salvador	Visa required		
Equatorial Guinea	eVisa		
Eritrea	Visa required		
Estonia	Visa required		
Eswatini	Visa required		
Ethiopia	eVisa	90 days	e-Visa holders must arrive via Addis Ababa Bole International Airport.; No visa required for Diplomatic and Official Passport holders.
Fiji	Visa not required	4 months	
Finland	Visa required		
France	Visa required		
Gabon	eVisa		e-Visa holders must arrive via Libreville International Airport.
Gambia	Visa not required	90 days	
Georgia	Visa required		e-Visa available for holders of a valid Schengen visa or a valid visa from any of the OECD member countries or a valid residence permit of a Schengen Area|Schengen or OECD country or a valid residence permit of UAE.; Visa on arrival for up to 15 days for valid residence permit holders of any country in the GCC (Bahrain, Kuwait, Oman, Qatar, Saudi Arabia and the UAE).
Germany	Visa required		
Ghana	Visa required		
Greece	Visa required		
Grenada	Visa not required	3 months	
Guatemala	Visa required		
Guinea	eVisa	90 days	
Guinea-Bissau	Visa on arrival	90 days	
Guyana	Visa required		
Haiti	Visa not required	3 months	
Honduras	Visa required		
Hungary	Visa required		
Iceland	Visa required		
India	Visa required		No visa required for Diplomatic and Official Passport holders.; Visa fee waived for regular or ordinary passport holders.
Indonesia	eVisa	60 days	Bangladeshi citizens require a guarantor to obtain an Indonesian eVisa; therefore, it is impossible to obtain one directly through the Directorate General of Immigration website. The travel agency acts as your sponsor during the visa application process, and Indonesia issues the visa under that company's sponsorship.; No visa required for diplomatic and official passport holders.; Single entry
Iran	eVisa		
Iraq	Visa required	30 days	
Ireland	Visa required		
Israel	Visa required		Bangladesh does not recognize the State of Israel. Bangladeshi passports contain the phrase, "valid for all countries except Israel."
Italy	Visa required		
Jamaica	Visa not required	6 months	
Japan	Visa required		No visa required for Diplomatic Passport holders.
Jordan	Visa required		
Kazakhstan	eVisa		No visa required for diplomatic and official passport holders.
Kenya	Electronic Travel Authorisation	90 days	Applications can be submitted up to 90 days prior to travel and must be submitted at least 3 days in advance.; eTA fee is 32.50 USD.; Proof of reservation at the hotel where visitors plan to stay is required (if staying with friends, an invitation letter is also acceptable).; Yellow fever vaccination certificate is required if coming from endemic countries.
Kiribati	Visa not required	90 days	May not exceed 90 days within any given 12-month period.
North Korea	Visa required		
South Korea	Visa required		Bangladeshi national who holds a visa, re-entry permit or permanent residency to enter the United States, Canada, Japan, Australia or New Zealand can enter South Korea without a visa for a stay of up to 30 days, if their purpose of visit is transit.; No visa required for diplomatic and official passport holders.
Kosovo	Visa required		No visa required for diplomatic and official passport holders.
Kuwait	Visa required		No visa required for diplomatic and official passport holders.
Kyrgyzstan	eVisa	60 days	e-Visa holders must arrive via Manas International Airport or Osh Airport or through land crossings with China (at Irkeshtam and Torugart), Kazakhstan (at Ak-jol, Ak-Tilek, Chaldybar, Chon-Kapka), Tajikistan (at Bor-Dobo, Kulundu, Kyzyl-Bel) and Uzbekistan (at Dostuk).
Laos	Visa required		
Latvia	Visa required		
Lebanon	Visa required		In addition to a visa, an approval should be obtained from the Immigration department of the General Directorate of General Security (La Surete Generale).
Lesotho	Visa not required	90 days	
Liberia	Visa required		
Libya	Admission refused		Admission refused since May 2015.
Liechtenstein	Visa required		
Lithuania	Visa required		
Luxembourg	Visa required		
Madagascar	Visa on arrival	90 days	
Malawi	eVisa	90 days	
Malaysia	eVisa	30 days	Single Entry.; No visa required for Diplomatic and Official Passport holders up to 30 Days.
Maldives	Free visa on arrival	30 days	
Mali	Visa required		
Malta	Visa required		
Marshall Islands	Visa required		
Mauritania	eVisa		Available at Nouakchott–Oumtounsy International Airport.
Mauritius	Visa required		
Mexico	Visa required		Visa is not required if holding a permanent residency card from Canada, Chile, Colombia, Japan, United Kingdom, Peru, United States or any of the Schengen countries.; Visa not required if holding a valid visa from Canada, Japan, United Kingdom, United States, or any of the Schengen countries.
Micronesia	Visa not required	30 days	
Moldova	eVisa		
Monaco	Visa required		
Mongolia	Visa required		No visa required for Diplomatic and Official Passport holders up to 30 Days.
Montenegro	Visa required		Holder of a valid travel documents containing a valid residence permit or multiple entry visa in the countries of the Schengen zone, USA, Australia, Japan, Canada, New Zealand, Ireland and the United Kingdom can pass through the territory and stay in Montenegro up to 30 days, and not longer than the expiry of visa if the period of validity of the visa is less than 30 days.; Holder of a valid UAE 10 years' residence permit may enter without visa for seven days.
Morocco	Visa required		e-Visa availability for the Schengen, USA, Canada, UK valid visa or Permanent Resident Card holders. (T-chy)
Mozambique	eVisa	30 days	Upon arrival, the visa will be issued after payment of the fee at the point of entry.
Myanmar	eVisa	28 days	e-Visa holders must arrive via Yangon, Nay Pyi Taw or Mandalay airports or via land border crossings with Thailand — Tachileik, Myawaddy and Kawthaung or India — Rih Khaw Dar and Tamu.; e-Visa is available for tourism only.; No visa required for Diplomatic and Official Passport holders up to 90 days.
Namibia	Visa required		
Nauru	Visa required		
Nepal	Online visa / Visa on arrival	90 days	
Netherlands	Visa required		
New Zealand	Online Visa required		May apply online (Online Visitor visa).; Holders of an Australian Permanent Resident Visa or Resident Return Visa may be granted a New Zealand Resident Visa on arrival permitting indefinite stay (pursuant to the Trans-Tasman Travel Arrangement), subject to meeting character requirements and obtaining an Electronic Travel Authority prior to departure.
Nicaragua	Visa required		Visa on arrival if holding a valid visa issued by United States, Canada, or Schengen Member State.
Niger	Visa required		
Nigeria	eVisa	90 days	
North Macedonia	Visa required		Approval from the Ministry of Interior required.; Foreign citizens holding valid travel documents of third countries who hold a valid multiple-entry British, American or Canadian visa, inserted in the passport, whereby the length of their stay should be up to 15 days, and the validity of the valid multiple-entry British, American and Canadian visa, inserted in the passport should be 5 days longer than the planned.
Norway	Visa required		
Oman	Visa required		Bangladeshi holding a GCC visa of certain categories (managers, sales executives, etc.) are granted a visit visa on arrival if they are coming directly from a GCC Country.
Pakistan	eVisa	90 days	Issued free of charge as of August 2024.; No visa needed for Diplomatic and Official passport holders.
Palau	Visa required		
Panama	Visa required		
Papua New Guinea	eVisa	60 days	Visitors may apply for a visa online under the "Tourist - Own Itinerary" category.
Paraguay	Visa required		
Peru	Visa required		No visa required for Diplomatic and Official Passport holders.
Philippines	eVisa		No visa required for Diplomatic and Official Passport holders for a stay of up to 30 days.; The eVisa is only applicable for tourism only.; Visas for other purposes are still sticker visa based.; Travellers must complete the online Philippine e-Travel Registration Form only after receiving their e-visa and within 72 hours before departure.
Poland	Visa required		
Portugal	Visa required		
Qatar	eVisa	30 days	Visitors may apply for a visa on the Hayya website.
Romania	Visa required		
Russia	Visa required		No visa required for Official and Diplomatic passport holders.
Rwanda	Visa not required	30 days	
Saint Kitts and Nevis	Electronic Travel Authorisation	3 months	
Saint Lucia	Visa required		
Saint Vincent and the Grenadines	Visa not required	3 months	
Samoa	Visa not required	60 days	
San Marino	Visa required		Visa not required if holding a valid Schengen Visa.
São Tomé and Príncipe	eVisa		
Saudi Arabia	Visa required		Visa on Arrival or eVisa for the Permanent Resident Card holders of the Schengen countries or USA, UK and any Schengen countries valid used tourist visa and the GCC residence visa holders.
Senegal	Visa required		
Serbia	Visa required		Visa free for a maximum stay of 90 days for valid visa holders or residents of the European Union member states and the United States.
Seychelles	Electronic Border System	3 months	Application can be submitted up to 30 days before travel.; Visitors must upload a reservation confirmation(s) for each visitor's location of stay in Seychelles.; Yellow fever vaccination certificate is required if coming from endemic countries.; Payment of the fee (EUR 10) by credit or debit card.; Valid for one journey only and it expires once exit the country.
Sierra Leone	eVisa / Visa on arrival	3 months / 30 days	
Singapore	eVisa		No visa required for diplomatic and official Passport holders.; An eVisa can only be obtained through a local contact, strategic partner or authorized visa agent.; Refer to the bottom half of the Singaporean High Commission's visa applications page for authorized visa agents in Bangladesh.
Slovakia	Visa required		
Slovenia	Visa required		
Solomon Islands	Visa required		
Somalia	eVisa	30 days	All visitors must have an approved Electronic Visa (eTAS) before the start of their journey.
South Africa	Visa required		
South Sudan	eVisa		Obtainable online.; Printed visa authorization must be presented at the time of travel.
Spain	Visa required		
Sri Lanka	Electronic Travel Authorisation/Visa on Arrival	30 days	Bangladeshi passport holders must pay a $20 fee for the ETA.
Sudan	Admission refused		For ordinary passport holders, entry and transit is refused unless arriving for commercial delegations or as students studying at a Sudanese institute of higher education or university and holding a residence permit.
Suriname	eVisa		
Sweden	Visa required		
Switzerland	Visa required		
Syria	eVisa	180 days	
Tajikistan	eVisa	60 days	
Tanzania	eVisa		Visa on arrival if holding a referral visa.
Thailand	eVisa		No visa required for Diplomatic and Official Passport holders.
Timor-Leste	Visa on arrival	30 days	No visa required for Diplomatic, Service and Official Passport holders.
Togo	eVisa	15 days	
Tonga	Visa required		
Trinidad and Tobago	Visa not required		
Tunisia	eVisa		Visa on arrival for up to 15 days for valid residence permit holders of any country in the GCC (Bahrain, Kuwait, Oman, Qatar, Saudi Arabia and the UAE).
Turkey	Visa required	30 days	No visa required for Diplomatic and Official passport holders; e-Visa available for holders of a valid Schengen visa; a valid visa from any USA, UK; or a valid residence permit of a Schengen Area|Schengen. (T-chy); Single entry.
Turkmenistan	Visa required		Invitation letter required
Tuvalu	Visa on arrival	1 month	
Uganda	eVisa	3 months	
Ukraine	Visa required		
United Arab Emirates	Visa required		May apply using 'Smart Service'.
United Kingdom	eVisa		From 25 February 2026 onwards, Bangladeshi passport holders will only be granted e-visas for all visa types.; As per the British High Commission in Dhaka, after the visa is granted, applicants must create a UK Visas and Immigration (UKVI) account to link their passport details and use their e-visa.
United States	Visa required		As of 2026, Bangladeshi passport holders will have to pay a refundable visa bond after receiving visa approval. US Ambassador Brent T. Christensen has stated that it must be paid after the applicant has received a clear confirmation of their acceptance and not before. Moreover, it must be paid directly, based on instructions provided, and not through a third-party.; The bond may range from $5,000 to $15,000. Once the traveller returns within the designated time, while abiding by the conditions accepted beforehand, it will be automatically cancelled and refunded.; Visitors are required to check the “Admit Until Date” on their I-94 record to determine their authorized period of stay. The expiration date of a B1/B2 visitor visa does not determine the length of stay.
Uruguay	Visa required		
Uzbekistan	Visa required		
Vanuatu	Visa not required	30 days	
Vatican City	Visa required		
Venezuela	eVisa		Introduction of Electronic Visa System for Tourist and Business Travelers.
Vietnam	eVisa		e-Visa is valid for 90 days and multiple entry.; Traveling directly to Phu Quoc Island are allowed to stay on the island for up-to 30 days without a visa.; No visa required for Diplomatic and Official Passport holders up to 90 days.
Yemen	Visa required		
Zambia	eVisa	3 months	
Zimbabwe	eVisa	90 days	

== See also ==
- Visa policy of Bangladesh
- List of nationalities forbidden at border
