= Visa policy of Bangladesh =

Policy on permits required to enter Bangladesh

Bangladesh requires all foreigners to obtain permission, specifically a visa, to enter its territory unless exempted. Visas are issued by Bangladesh diplomatic missions located throughout the world or, if applicable, on arrival in Bangladesh.

Visa extensions are available at the Department of Immigration and Passports located in Shere-E-Bangla Nagar, West Agargaon, Dhaka City.

Regular visas are available at all Consulates, Embassies and High Commissions of Bangladesh worldwide. A regular visa is usually a multiple-entry visa valid up to 60 months, unlike a Visa On Arrival, which is just a single-entry visa valid up to 30 days. All these visas can be extended or renewed at the Department of Immigration and Passports in Dhaka City.

== Visa policy map ==
Bangladesh Visa not required Visa on arrival (de jure) Visa on arrival (de facto) Visa required Admission refused (Israel)

== Visa exemption ==
=== Ordinary passports ===
Holders of ordinary passports of the following countries may enter Bangladesh without a visa for up to 90 days:

- Barbados
- Bhutan
- Botswana
- Burkina Faso
- Fiji
- Gabon
- Gambia
- Ghana
- Grenada
- Guinea
- Guinea-Bissau
- Jamaica
- Lesotho
- Malawi
- Maldives
- Papua New Guinea
- Saint Kitts and Nevis
- Samoa
- Seychelles
- Sierra Leone
- Tanzania
- Tonga
- Zambia

=== Non-ordinary passports ===
In addition to countries whose citizens are visa-exempt, holders of diplomatic, official or service passports of the following countries may enter Bangladesh without a visa for 30 days (unless otherwise noted):

- ASEAN member states (except Thailand)

- Belarus
- China
- Estonia^{D}
- Eswatini
- India^{D 2}
- Japan^{D 1}
- Oman
- Pakistan^{D}
- Russia
- Serbia
- South Korea
- Sri Lanka
- Thailand^{D}
- Turkey^{D}
- Ukraine

_{D - Diplomatic only.}
_{1 - 90 days}
_{2 - 45 days}

Diplomatic, Official & Service Passport Holders of Jordan may be eligible for visa on arrival at any port of entry that is listed.

== Visa on arrival ==
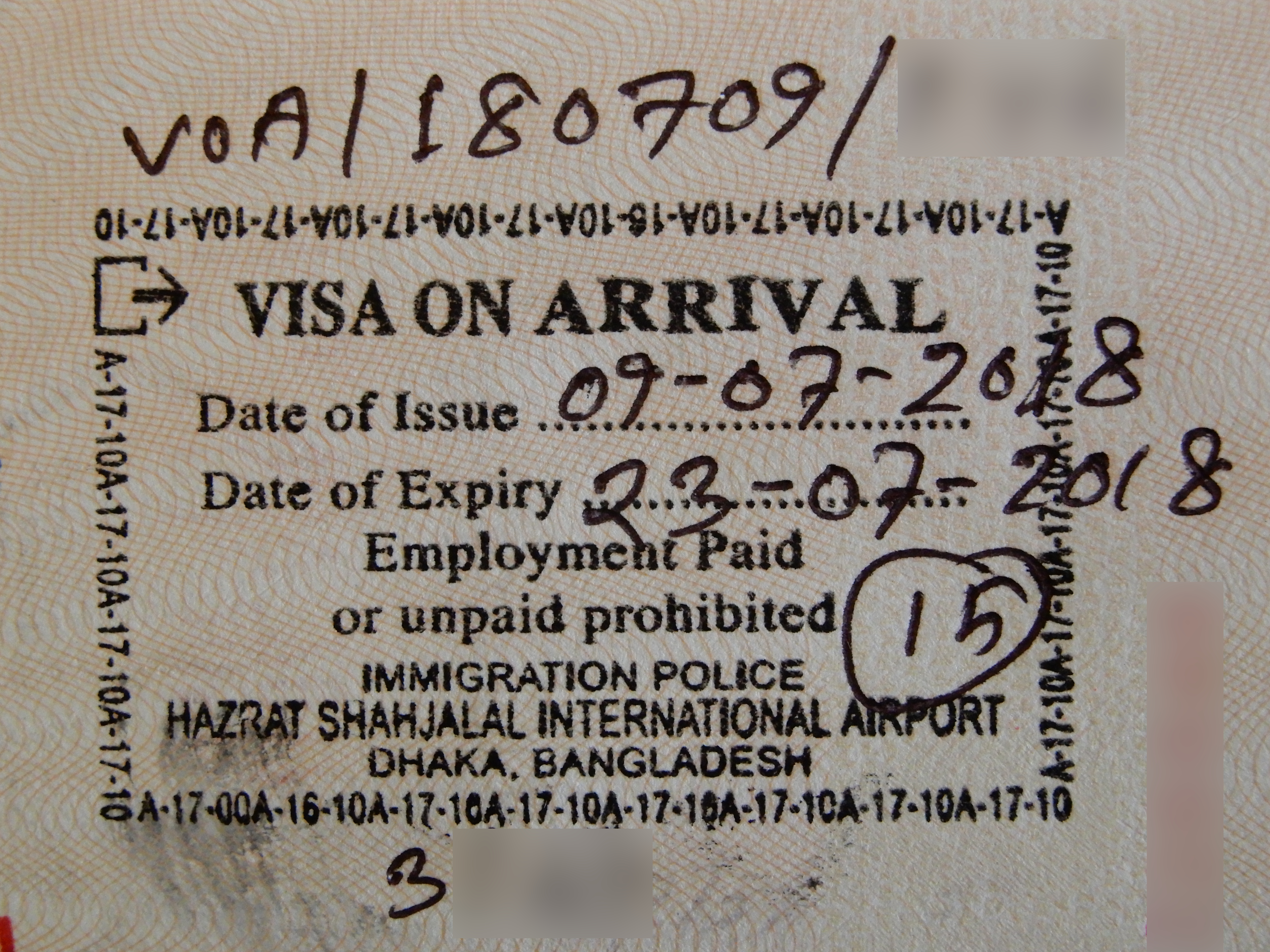
Visa on arrival issued at Shahjalal International Airport

According to Timatic, the following countries are specifically listed as countries whose citizens may obtain visa on arrival for the purpose of official duty, business, investment and tourism regardless of the Bangladeshi mission status:

The Visa On Arrival fee must be paid only in cash in US dollars or Euros when entering Bangladesh and the cost per person is 51 USD or €51, with all taxes included. The maximum duration of this single-entry Visa On Arrival is 30 days and it can be extended for an additional 30 days. Applicants can apply for the extension of the Visa On Arrival up to a week before visa expiry but not sooner. Visa extensions are available at the Department of Immigration and Passports located in Shere-E-Bangla Nagar, West Agargaon, Dhaka City.

- an eligible passport which is valid for at least 6 months after arrival in Bangladesh;
- printout of a return/onward air ticket or international train ticket or international bus ticket;
- printout of a booking, with a hotel or a tour company in Bangladesh, valid for the entire duration of the intended stay in Bangladesh; or an invitation letter from a business or a company operating in Bangladesh; or the contact details of Bangladeshi close relatives, residing in Bangladesh, who are expecting and will vouch for the visa seeker;
- and entering Bangladesh by air, sea or road but not on a train.

Most diplomats can get a Visa On Arrival in Bangladesh if travelling with a diplomatic passport. The issuance of a Visa On Arrival in Bangladesh is at the sole discretion of the immigration official at the port of entry in Bangladesh.

Travelers who wish to enter Bangladesh for any purpose other than tourism, investment or business, and all foreigners who are not visa exempt, need a valid Bangladeshi visa beforehand to enter Bangladesh.

- All European Union member states

- Australia
- Bahrain
- Brunei
- Canada
- China
- Iceland
- Indonesia
- Japan
- Kuwait
- Liechtenstein
- Malaysia
- New Zealand
- Norway
- Oman
- Qatar
- Russia
- Saudi Arabia
- Singapore
- South Korea
- Switzerland
- Turkey
- United Arab Emirates
- United Kingdom
- United States

== Visa required ==
In addition, according to Timatic, Henley & Partners and the Passport Index, citizens of the following countries and territories must obtain a visa in advance:

- Afghanistan
- Algeria^{1}
- Belize
- Brazil^{1}
- Egypt^{1}
- Hong Kong^{1}
- India
- Iran^{1}
- Iraq^{1}
- Jordan^{1}
- Kenya^{1}
- Lebanon^{1}
- Libya^{1}
- Macao
- Mauritius^{1}
- Mexico^{1}
- Morocco^{1}
- Myanmar
- Nigeria
- Paraguay
- Philippines^{1}
- South Africa^{1}
- Sri Lanka
- Syria^{1}
- Thailand^{1}
- Tunisia
- Uzbekistan^{1}
- Vietnam^{1}
- Yemen

_{1 - unless they are residing in a country without a Bangladeshi representation.}

== Israel ==
Entry and transit is refused to Israeli nationals, even if not leaving the aircraft and proceeding by the same flight.

== No Visa Required seal / vignette ==
Bangladesh missions provide a No Visa Required (NVR) seal or vignette (sticker) for citizens of Bangladesh who have a foreign passport and dual nationality, as well as to non-Bangladeshis who are the legally married spouses or children of citizens of Bangladesh.

The NVR is placed on a blank page in the applicant's foreign passport. It is either in the form of a seal or a vignette (sticker), although the seal version is being phased out and replaced by the vignette.

This NVR allows the passport holder to travel to Bangladesh an unlimited number of times without any restrictions on duration, or limits on entry, throughout the validity of the passport containing the NVR.

The guidelines of the Ministry of Home Affairs do not explicitly indicate whether the spousal NVR entitlement only applies to opposite-sex couples.

The NVR is valid until the expiry of the non-Bangladeshi passport the NVR is in. Once this passport expires, a new NVR can be placed in a new passport of the same person by showing the previous expired passport containing the expired NVR.

== See also ==
- Visa requirements for Bangladeshi citizens
- Diplomatic Missions of Bangladesh
- Foreign relations of Bangladesh
- Foreign policy of Bangladesh
- Bangladesh Visa Portal
