= Marino Rigon =

Italian-Bangladeshi Xaverian missionary priest

- Born: 5 January 1925; Villaverla, Vicenza, Italy
- Died: 19 October 2017 (aged 92); Vicenza, Italy

Marino Rigon (5 January 1925 – 19 October 2017) was an Italian-Bangladeshi Xaverian missionary priest popularly known as the "friend of Bengalis". Rigon was born in Villaverla, Vicenza, Italy in 1925. In 1953, he moved to the East Bengal province of Pakistan and during the 1971 Bangladesh Liberation War, he gave shelter and cared for the injured. He lived in Bangladesh as a missionary for sixty years preaching the Gospel among Catholics using the local language (Bengali) and making a tremendous contribution to the Catholic Church of Bangladesh.

Father Rigon established a Rabindra study centre in Italy in 1990. He was famous for translating the works of Bengali poet and Nobel Prize winner Rabindranath Tagore. Rigon translated forty of Tagore's works into Italian. He also translated a number of other literary works, including mystic poet Lalon Fakir's songs and Jasim Uddin's Nakshikanthar Math into Italian. Many of the books were later re-translated to French, Spanish and Portuguese. He received many literary awards during his life. With Rigon's help, a Bangladeshi theatre troupe staged the musical drama Nakshikanthar Math in Italy in 1986. Rigon translated the Italian fantasy fiction book, The Adventures of Pinocchio, into Bengali.

He was passionate about education and established seventeen educational institutions. He was honoured as a freedom fighter of the 1971 Bangladesh Liberation War for his contributions during the war. In 2009, Father Marino Rigon was conferred honorary citizenship of Bangladesh by Prime Minister Sheikh Hasina for his tireless and exemplary contributions to society, especially in Bangladesh. Very few foreigners are conferred such an honour. At the age of ninety-two, father Rigon died of old age complications in Vicenza, Italy, on 19 October 2017.

== Honours ==
Marino died on 19 October 2017 in Italy and was laid to rest on 21 October 2018 at Shelabunia Church cemetery in Mongla of Bagerhat, Bangladesh. Honouring his last wish, Marino's mortal remains were buried at the cemetery of the church that he founded. Earlier, the coffin with his remains arrived at Shahjalal International Airport in Dhaka on a Turkish Airlines flight. A guard of honour was given to the Father at the churchyard, where people from all walks of life paid tribute to him at Mongla Upazila Parishad ground. Father Rigon was given honorary citizenship of Bangladesh in 2009 and was conferred the “Friends of Liberation War Honour” award in 2012 for his support and contribution during the war of independence in 1971 of Bangladesh. During Bangladesh's Liberation War, Rigon was at Baniarchar Church in Gopalganj, Bangladesh. He provided support and medical treatment to sick and injured freedom fighters, and actively took part in the war. After the independence of Bangladesh, he made Shelabunia of Mongla his permanent residence. In 2014, when he fell gravely ill with cardiac disease, his brother took him to Italy.
