= Krasnaya Gorka =

Krasnaya Gorka (Russian: Красная Горка; lit. red / beautiful hill) is a noun phrase that refers to:

- a traditional springtime East Slavic folk festival falling on the next Sunday after East Orthodox Easter (Second Sunday of Easter dedicated to Saint Thomas the Apostle);
- the name of multiple rural localities in Russia and other lands of East Slavs.
  - Krasnaya Gorka fort west of Saint Petersburg, Russia.

== Modern localities ==
=== Russia ===
==== Amur Oblast ====
As of 2012, one rural locality in Amur Oblast bears this name:

- Krasnaya Gorka, Amur Oblast, a selo in Antonovsky Rural Settlement of Arkharinsky District

==== Arkhangelsk Oblast ====
As of 2012, four rural localities in Arkhangelsk Oblast bear this name:

- Krasnaya Gorka, Kholmogorsky District, Arkhangelsk Oblast, a village in Kekhotsky Selsoviet of Kholmogorsky District
- Krasnaya Gorka, Pinezhsky District, Arkhangelsk Oblast, a settlement in Pinezhsky Selsoviet of Pinezhsky District
- Krasnaya Gorka, Shegovarsky Selsoviet, Shenkursky District, Arkhangelsk Oblast, a settlement in Shegovarsky Selsoviet of Shenkursky District
- Krasnaya Gorka, Yamskogorsky Selsoviet, Shenkursky District, Arkhangelsk Oblast, a village in Yamskogorsky Selsoviet of Shenkursky District

==== Republic of Bashkortostan ====
As of 2012, four rural localities in the Republic of Bashkortostan bear this name:

- Krasnaya Gorka, Arkhangelsky District, Republic of Bashkortostan, a village in Krasnozilimsky Selsoviet of Arkhangelsky District
- Krasnaya Gorka, Bakalinsky District, Republic of Bashkortostan, a village in Staromatinsky Selsoviet of Bakalinsky District
- Krasnaya Gorka, Bizhbulyaksky District, Republic of Bashkortostan, a village in Ziriklinsky Selsoviet of Bizhbulyaksky District
- Krasnaya Gorka, Nurimanovsky District, Republic of Bashkortostan, a selo in Krasnogorsky Selsoviet of Nurimanovsky District

==== Chuvash Republic ====
As of 2012, one rural locality in the Chuvash Republic bears this name:

- Krasnaya Gorka, Chuvash Republic, a village in Vtorovurmankasinskoye Rural Settlement of Tsivilsky District

==== Ivanovo Oblast ====
As of 2012, one rural locality in Ivanovo Oblast bears this name:

- Krasnaya Gorka, Ivanovo Oblast, a village in Savinsky District

==== Kaliningrad Oblast ====
As of 2012, one rural locality in Kaliningrad Oblast bears this name:

- Krasnaya Gorka, Kaliningrad Oblast, a settlement in Kamensky Rural Okrug of Chernyakhovsky District

==== Republic of Karelia ====
As of 2012, two rural localities in the Republic of Karelia bear this name:

- Krasnaya Gorka, Sortavala, Republic of Karelia, a settlement under the administrative jurisdiction of the town of republic significance of Sortavala
- Krasnaya Gorka, Belomorsky District, Republic of Karelia, a village in Belomorsky District

==== Kemerovo Oblast ====
As of 2012, three rural localities in Kemerovo Oblast bear this name:

- Krasnaya Gorka, Anzhero-Sudzhensk, Kemerovo Oblast, a settlement under the administrative jurisdiction of Anzhero-Sudzhensk Town Under Oblast Jurisdiction; 56°7′N 86°2′E
- Krasnaya Gorka, Leninsk-Kuznetsky District, Kemerovo Oblast, a settlement in Chkalovskaya Rural Territory of Leninsk-Kuznetsky District; 54°42′N 85°59′E
- Krasnaya Gorka, Prokopyevsky District, Kemerovo Oblast, a settlement in Safonovskaya Rural Territory of Prokopyevsky District; 53°51′N 86°28′E

==== Kirov Oblast ====
As of 2012, two rural localities in Kirov Oblast bear this name:

- Krasnaya Gorka, Kiknursky District, Kirov Oblast, a village in Russko-Krainsky Rural Okrug of Kiknursky District; 57°25′N 46°56′E
- Krasnaya Gorka, Yaransky District, Kirov Oblast, a village in Opytnopolsky Rural Okrug of Yaransky District; 57°25′N 47°58′E

==== Kostroma Oblast ====
As of 2012, one rural locality in Kostroma Oblast bears this name:

- Krasnaya Gorka, Kostroma Oblast, a village in Troitskoye Settlement of Sharyinsky District; 58°11′N 45°42′E

==== Krasnodar Krai ====
As of 2012, two rural localities in Krasnodar Krai bear this name:

- Krasnaya Gorka, Anapsky District, Krasnodar Krai, a khutor in Pervomaysky Rural Okrug of Anapsky District; 45°8′N 37°27′E
- Krasnaya Gorka, Apsheronsky District, Krasnodar Krai, a khutor under the administrative jurisdiction of the Town of Khadyzhensk in Apsheronsky District; 44°26′N 39°38′E

==== Kurgan Oblast ====
As of 2012, one rural locality in Kurgan Oblast bears this name:

- Krasnaya Gorka, Kurgan Oblast, a village in Priloginsky Selsoviet of Lebyazhyevsky District; 55°31′N 66°28′E

==== Kursk Oblast ====
As of 2012, two rural localities in Kursk Oblast bear this name:

- Krasnaya Gorka, Bolshesoldatsky District, Kursk Oblast, a selo in Lyubimovsky Selsoviet of Bolshesoldatsky District
- Krasnaya Gorka, Pristensky District, Kursk Oblast, a khutor in Chernovetsky Selsoviet of Pristensky District

==== Leningrad Oblast ====
As of 2012, four rural localities in Leningrad Oblast bear this name:

- Krasnaya Gorka, Kingiseppsky District, Leningrad Oblast, a village in Vistinskoye Settlement Municipal Formation of Kingiseppsky District
- Krasnaya Gorka, Kirishsky District, Leningrad Oblast, a village in Budogoshchskoye Settlement Municipal Formation in Kirishsky District
- Krasnaya Gorka, Luzhsky District, Leningrad Oblast, a village in Volodarskoye Settlement Municipal Formation of Luzhsky District
- Krasnaya Gorka, Vsevolozhsky District, Leningrad Oblast, a village in Koltushskoye Settlement Municipal Formation of Vsevolozhsky District; 59°58′N 30°40′E

==== Mari El Republic ====
As of 2012, five rural localities in the Mari El Republic bear this name:

- Krasnaya Gorka, Kuznetsovsky Rural Okrug, Gornomariysky District, Mari El Republic, a village in Kuznetsovsky Rural Okrug of Gornomariysky District
- Krasnaya Gorka, Yemeshevsky Rural Okrug, Gornomariysky District, Mari El Republic, a village in Yemeshevsky Rural Okrug of Gornomariysky District
- Krasnaya Gorka, Dubnikovsky Rural Okrug, Sernursky District, Mari El Republic, a village in Dubnikovsky Rural Okrug of Sernursky District
- Krasnaya Gorka, Kuknursky Rural Okrug, Sernursky District, Mari El Republic, a village in Kuknursky Rural Okrug of Sernursky District
- Krasnaya Gorka, Volzhsky District, Mari El Republic, a village under the administrative jurisdiction of Privolzhsky Urban-Type Settlement in Volzhsky District

==== Republic of Mordovia ====
As of 2012, one rural locality in the Republic of Mordovia bears this name:

- Krasnaya Gorka, Republic of Mordovia, a settlement in Staroteshtelimsky Selsoviet of Yelnikovsky District

==== Moscow Oblast ====
As of 2012, three rural localities in Moscow Oblast bear this name:

- Krasnaya Gorka, Istrinsky District, Moscow Oblast, a settlement in Luchinskoye Rural Settlement of Istrinsky District
- Krasnaya Gorka, Mytishchinsky District, Moscow Oblast, a village in Fedoskinskoye Rural Settlement of Mytishchinsky District
- Krasnaya Gorka, Shatursky District, Moscow Oblast, a village in Dmitrovskoye Rural Settlement of Shatursky District

==== Nizhny Novgorod Oblast ====
As of 2014, nine rural localities in Nizhny Novgorod Oblast bear this name:

- Krasnaya Gorka, Semyonov, Nizhny Novgorod Oblast, a village in Khakhalsky Selsoviet under the administrative jurisdiction of the town of oblast significance of Semyonov
- Krasnaya Gorka, Lukoyanovsky District, Nizhny Novgorod Oblast, a village in Kudeyarovsky Selsoviet of Lukoyanovsky District
- Krasnaya Gorka, Perevozsky District, Nizhny Novgorod Oblast, a settlement in Ichalkovsky Selsoviet of Perevozsky District
- Krasnaya Gorka, Krasnogorsky Selsoviet, Pilninsky District, Nizhny Novgorod Oblast, a selo in Krasnogorsky Selsoviet of Pilninsky District
- Krasnaya Gorka, Kurmyshsky Selsoviet, Pilninsky District, Nizhny Novgorod Oblast, a settlement in Kurmyshsky Selsoviet of Pilninsky District
- Krasnaya Gorka, Sharangsky District, Nizhny Novgorod Oblast, a settlement in Rozhentsovsky Selsoviet of Sharangsky District
- Krasnaya Gorka, Shatkovsky District, Nizhny Novgorod Oblast, a settlement in Kerzhemoksky Selsoviet of Shatkovsky District
- Krasnaya Gorka, Volodarsky District, Nizhny Novgorod Oblast, a settlement in Krasnaya Gorka Selsoviet of Volodarsky District
- Krasnaya Gorka, Vorotynsky District, Nizhny Novgorod Oblast, a settlement in Krasnogorsky Selsoviet of Vorotynsky District

==== Novgorod Oblast ====
As of 2012, five rural localities in Novgorod Oblast bear this name:

- Krasnaya Gorka, Demyansky District, Novgorod Oblast, a village in Pesotskoye Settlement of Demyansky District
- Krasnaya Gorka, Khvoyninsky District, Novgorod Oblast, a village in Zvyaginskoye Settlement of Khvoyninsky District
- Krasnaya Gorka, Malovishersky District, Novgorod Oblast, a village in Burginskoye Settlement of Malovishersky District
- Krasnaya Gorka, Bykovskoye Settlement, Pestovsky District, Novgorod Oblast, a village in Bykovskoye Settlement of Pestovsky District
- Krasnaya Gorka, Okhonskoye Settlement, Pestovsky District, Novgorod Oblast, a village in Okhonskoye Settlement of Pestovsky District

==== Omsk Oblast ====
As of 2012, one rural locality in Omsk Oblast bears this name:

- Krasnaya Gorka, Omsk Oblast, a selo in Druzhinsky Rural Okrug of Omsky District

==== Oryol Oblast ====
As of 2012, four rural localities in Oryol Oblast bear this name:

- Krasnaya Gorka, Glazunovsky District, Oryol Oblast, a settlement in Senkovsky Selsoviet of Glazunovsky District
- Krasnaya Gorka, Korsakovsky District, Oryol Oblast, a village in Korsakovsky Selsoviet of Korsakovsky District
- Krasnaya Gorka, Mtsensky District, Oryol Oblast, a village in Podberezovsky Selsoviet of Mtsensky District
- Krasnaya Gorka, Orlovsky District, Oryol Oblast, a settlement in Zhilyayevsky Selsoviet of Orlovsky District

==== Penza Oblast ====
As of 2012, one rural locality in Penza Oblast bears this name:

- Krasnaya Gorka, Penza Oblast, a selo in Lachinovsky Selsoviet of Kolyshleysky District

==== Perm Krai ====
As of 2012, one rural locality in Perm Krai bears this name:

- Krasnaya Gorka, Perm Krai, a village under the administrative jurisdiction of the town of krai significance of Chusovoy

==== Pskov Oblast ====
As of 2012, seven rural localities in Pskov Oblast bear this name:

- Krasnaya Gorka, Kunyinsky District, Pskov Oblast, a village in Kunyinsky District
- Krasnaya Gorka, Loknyansky District, Pskov Oblast, a village in Loknyansky District
- Krasnaya Gorka, Ostrovsky District, Pskov Oblast, a village in Ostrovsky District
- Krasnaya Gorka, Porkhovsky District, Pskov Oblast, a village in Porkhovsky District
- Krasnaya Gorka, Pskovsky District, Pskov Oblast, a village in Pskovsky District
- Krasnaya Gorka, Pskovsky District, Pskov Oblast, a village in Pskovsky District
- Krasnaya Gorka, Strugo-Krasnensky District, Pskov Oblast, a village in Strugo-Krasnensky District

==== Rostov Oblast ====
As of 2012, one rural locality in Rostov Oblast bears this name:

- Krasnaya Gorka, Rostov Oblast, a khutor in Malokirsanovskoye Rural Settlement of Matveyevo-Kurgansky District

==== Ryazan Oblast ====
As of 2012, two rural localities in Ryazan Oblast bear this name:

- Krasnaya Gorka, Korablinsky District, Ryazan Oblast, a village in Kipchakovsky Rural Okrug of Korablinsky District
- Krasnaya Gorka, Mikhaylovsky District, Ryazan Oblast, a settlement in Krasnovsky Rural Okrug of Mikhaylovsky District

==== Samara Oblast ====
As of 2012, two rural localities in Samara Oblast bear this name:

- Krasnaya Gorka, Chelno-Vershinsky District, Samara Oblast, a settlement in Chelno-Vershinsky District
- Krasnaya Gorka, Kinel-Cherkassky District, Samara Oblast, a selo in Kinel-Cherkassky District

==== Smolensk Oblast ====
As of 2012, four rural localities in Smolensk Oblast bear this name:

- Krasnaya Gorka, Krasninsky District, Smolensk Oblast, a village in Krasnovskoye Rural Settlement of Krasninsky District
- Krasnaya Gorka, Astapkovichskoye Rural Settlement, Roslavlsky District, Smolensk Oblast, a village in Astapkovichskoye Rural Settlement of Roslavlsky District
- Krasnaya Gorka, Zharynskoye Rural Settlement, Roslavlsky District, Smolensk Oblast, a village in Zharynskoye Rural Settlement of Roslavlsky District
- Krasnaya Gorka, Smolensky District, Smolensk Oblast, a village in Katynskoye Rural Settlement of Smolensky District

==== Sverdlovsk Oblast ====
As of 2012, one rural locality in Sverdlovsk Oblast bears this name:

- Krasnaya Gorka, Sverdlovsk Oblast, a settlement under the administrative jurisdiction of the Town of Polevskoy

==== Tambov Oblast ====
As of 2012, one rural locality in Tambov Oblast bears this name:

- Krasnaya Gorka, Tambov Oblast, a village in Tugolukovsky Selsoviet of Zherdevsky District

==== Republic of Tatarstan ====
As of 2012, four rural localities in the Republic of Tatarstan bear this name:

- Krasnaya Gorka, Almetyevsky District, Republic of Tatarstan, a village in Almetyevsky District
- Krasnaya Gorka, Arsky District, Republic of Tatarstan, a village in Arsky District
- Krasnaya Gorka, Mamadyshsky District, Republic of Tatarstan, a selo in Mamadyshsky District
- Krasnaya Gorka, Yelabuzhsky District, Republic of Tatarstan, a settlement in Yelabuzhsky District

==== Tomsk Oblast ====
As of 2012, one rural locality in Tomsk Oblast bears this name:

- Krasnaya Gorka, Tomsk Oblast, a village in Teguldetsky District

==== Tula Oblast ====
As of 2012, two rural localities in Tula Oblast bear this name:

- Krasnaya Gorka, Molchanovskaya Rural Administration, Chernsky District, Tula Oblast, a village in Molchanovskaya Rural Administration of Chernsky District
- Krasnaya Gorka, Turgenevskaya Rural Administration, Chernsky District, Tula Oblast, a village in Turgenevskaya Rural Administration of Chernsky District

==== Tver Oblast ====
As of 2012, ten rural localities in Tver Oblast bear this name:

- Krasnaya Gorka, Kalininsky District, Tver Oblast, a village in Turginovskoye Rural Settlement of Kalininsky District
- Krasnaya Gorka, Kalyazinsky District, Tver Oblast, a village in Nerlskoye Rural Settlement of Kalyazinsky District
- Krasnaya Gorka, Kimrsky District, Tver Oblast, a village in Privolzhskoye Rural Settlement of Kimrsky District
- Krasnaya Gorka, Likhoslavlsky District, Tver Oblast, a village in Mikshinskoye Rural Settlement of Likhoslavlsky District
- Krasnaya Gorka, Maksatikhinsky District, Tver Oblast, a village in Trestenskoye Rural Settlement of Maksatikhinsky District
- Krasnaya Gorka, Rameshkovsky District, Tver Oblast, a village in Zaklinye Rural Settlement of Rameshkovsky District
- Krasnaya Gorka, Selizharovsky District, Tver Oblast, a village in Berezugskoye Rural Settlement of Selizharovsky District
- Krasnaya Gorka, Torzhoksky District, Tver Oblast, a village in Yakonovskoye Rural Settlement of Torzhoksky District
- Krasnaya Gorka, Udomelsky District, Tver Oblast, a village in Moldinskoye Rural Settlement of Udomelsky District
- Krasnaya Gorka, Vyshnevolotsky District, Tver Oblast, a village in Zelenogorskoye Rural Settlement of Vyshnevolotsky District

==== Udmurt Republic ====
As of 2012, one rural locality in the Udmurt Republic bears this name:

- Krasnaya Gorka, Udmurt Republic, a vyselok in Bolgurinsky Selsoviet of Votkinsky District

==== Vladimir Oblast ====
As of 2012, three rural localities in Vladimir Oblast bear this name:

- Krasnaya Gorka, Selivanovsky District, Vladimir Oblast, a village in Selivanovsky District
- Krasnaya Gorka, Sudogodsky District, Vladimir Oblast, a village in Sudogodsky District
- Krasnaya Gorka, Yuryev-Polsky District, Vladimir Oblast, a selo in Yuryev-Polsky District

==== Vologda Oblast ====
As of 2012, four rural localities in Vologda Oblast bear this name:

- Krasnaya Gorka, Babayevsky District, Vologda Oblast, a village in Timoshinsky Selsoviet of Babayevsky District
- Krasnaya Gorka, Chagodoshchensky District, Vologda Oblast, a village in Lukinsky Selsoviet of Chagodoshchensky District
- Krasnaya Gorka, Kharovsky District, Vologda Oblast, a village in Shevnitsky Selsoviet of Kharovsky District
- Krasnaya Gorka, Sheksninsky District, Vologda Oblast, a village in Yershovsky Selsoviet of Sheksninsky District

==== Yaroslavl Oblast ====
As of 2012, three rural localities in Yaroslavl Oblast bear this name:

- Krasnaya Gorka, Rybinsky District, Yaroslavl Oblast, a settlement in Pokrovsky Rural Okrug of Rybinsky District
- Krasnaya Gorka, Uglichsky District, Yaroslavl Oblast, a village in Otradnovsky Rural Okrug of Uglichsky District
- Krasnaya Gorka, Yaroslavsky District, Yaroslavl Oblast, a village in Bekrenevsky Rural Okrug of Yaroslavsky District

== Alternative names ==
- Krasnaya Gorka, alternative name of Krasnogorsky, a settlement under the administrative jurisdiction of Polysayevo Town Under Oblast Jurisdiction in Kemerovo Oblast; 54°34′N 86°15′E
