= Belarus–Russia border =

International border

Coordinates: 56°9′36″N 28°9′36″E

Belarusian–Russian border
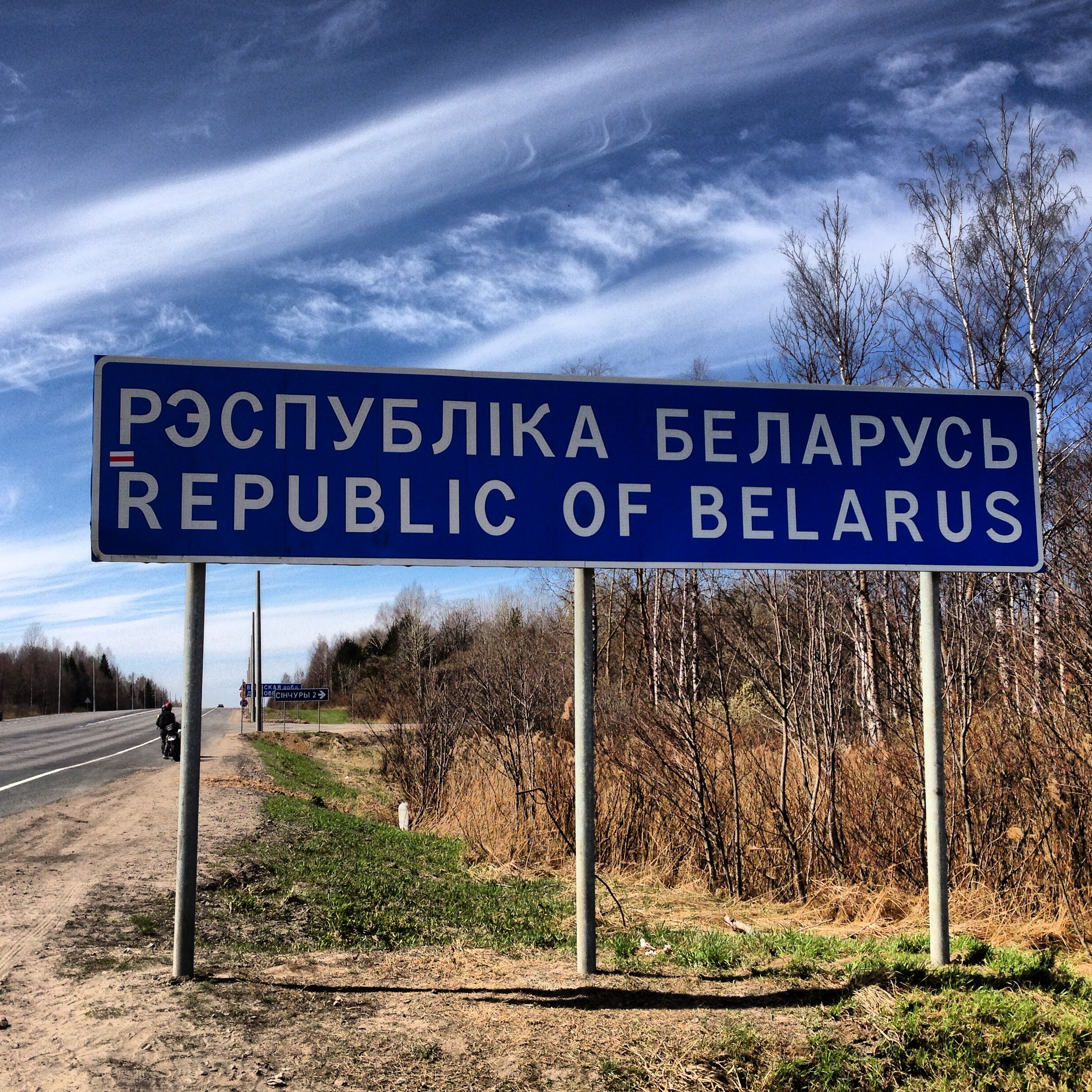

Characteristics
- Entities: Belarus; Russia
- Length: 1,239 km (770 mi)

History
- Established: December 1991; Dissolution of the Soviet Union

Belarusian and Russian boundary markers

The Belarusian–Russian border is the state border between Russia and Belarus. Prior to 1991, it was the border between the Russian Soviet Federative Socialist Republic and the Byelorussian Soviet Socialist Republic. The length of the border is 1,239 km (770 mi), including 857.7 km (533.0 mi) of land, 362.3 km (225.1 mi) of river and 19 km (12 mi) of lake.

Because of the Union State treaty and the Eurasian Economic Union, border control does not require customs checks or duty, although checks of identity documents do take place.

In January 2025, Russia and Belarus mutually recognized each other's visas, such that foreign citizens who have a visa to one of the countries and appropriate identity documents are allowed to travel between the two countries via air or land. Crossings over land, including via rail, must occur at one of six approved checkpoints: Yukhovichi–Dolostsy, Jezerishche–Nevel, Lyozna–Kruglovka, Redki – Krasnaya Gorka, Zvenchatka–Dubovichka, and Selishcha–Novozybkov.

== History ==
The border between the Republic of Belarus and the Russian Federation was formally formed after the dissolution of the Soviet Union in December 1991.

In order to implement the Treaty on the Creation of the Economic Union, Russia and Belarus concluded an agreement on a Belarus–Russia customs union on 6 January 1995. The parties stated that certain results have been achieved within the framework of the Agreement between the Government of the Russian Federation and the Government of the Republic of Belarus on the Unified Procedure for Regulation of Foreign Economic Activities signed on 12 April 1994 in Moscow. The Agreement on customs union between Russia and Belarus went into force on 30 November 1995. After that, customs and border controls were abolished.

On 26 May 1995, Belarusian President Alexander Lukashenko and Russian Prime Minister Viktor Chernomyrdin dismantled the border post at the Belarus-Russia border. Although the border guard agencies remained stationed in Pskov and Smolensk, and in Brest, Belarus, there were commandant's offices that carried out operational cover of external borders.

In June 2009, Belarus established customs posts and sent customs officers to the border because of the Milk War. Belarus withdrew the officers and dismantled the posts at the end of the month once the dispute was resolved.

On 1 April 2011, officially, custom control at the border was abolished. In accordance with the agreement, if the Belarusian transport authorities detect irregularities in the controlled parameters of a vehicle, the absence of necessary documents or irregularities in the documents, they issue the driver a notice of the deficiencies identified and advise them on the documents to be obtained before arriving in the territory of the other side. They also advise a carrier on the checkpoints on the other side, considering the route of a carrier, where a carrier must present proof that the discrepancies in controlled parameters of the vehicle have been addressed, and the documents specified in the notice. After receiving such a notice, a carrier must obtain confirmation at the Russian checkpoint that the irregularities have been removed. The vehicle can leave the territory of the Union State only after the carrier presents the notice with the Russian conformation.

In 2017, as relations between Russia and Belarus deteriorated, Russia restored border checks.

On 16 March 2020, the border was temporarily closed due to the COVID-19 pandemic.

In January 2025, Russia and Belarus mutually recognized each other's visas, such that foreign citizens who have a visa to one of the countries and appropriate identity documents are allowed to travel between the two countries via air or land. Crossings over land, including via rail, must occur at one of six approved checkpoints: Yukhovichi–Dolostsy, Jezerishche–Nevel, Liozno–Kruglovka, Redki – Krasnaya Gorka, Zvenchatka–Dubovichka, and Selishche–Novozybkov.

== See also ==
- Visa policy of Belarus
- Visa policy of Russia
