= Belarusian nationality law =

Belarusian Citizenship Act

Parliament of Belarus
- Enacted by: Government of Belarus
- Status: Current legislation

Belarusian nationality law regulates the manner in which one acquires, or is eligible to acquire, Belarusian nationality, citizenship. Belarusian citizenship is membership in the political community of the Republic of Belarus.

Belarusian citizenship is acquired and terminated in accordance with the Citizenship Act of the Republic of Belarus (2002), as well as international treaties to which Belarus is a party. These treaties include a 1998 treaty with Kazakhstan, a 1999 treaty with Ukraine, and a 1999 treaty with Kazakhstan, Kyrgyzstan and Russia.

== History ==
=== Belarusian citizenship from 1917 to 1991 ===
Regulations regarding Belarusian citizenship were issued by the Belarusian government from 1917-1991 and by the government of the Soviet Union from 1924-1991.

The Aliens Decree was issued on 4 August 1922, by the Sovnarkom of the Belarusian Soviet Socialist Republic. According to this decree, all subjects of the former Russian Empire who had permanent residence in the Byelorussian SSR, including refugees, were recognized as citizens of the Byelorussian SSR. Citizens of other Soviet Republics (such as the Russian Soviet Federative Socialist Republic) shared common rights and obligations with citizens of the Byelorussian SSR. All adults (except in the cases listed below) could apply for Belarusian SSR citizenship, and the children younger than 14 years of age of those who were granted Belarusian SSR citizenship acquired Byelorussian SSR citizenship automatically; the consent of children over 14 was necessary. Additionally, anyone could renounce citizenship. The following groups of people were deprived of citizenship (unless they received passports in consulates of Soviet Republics before 1 January 1923):

- persons who left the country without proper permission of Soviet government
- persons who struggled against the Soviet government
- persons who had the right to claim Belarusian SSR citizenship, but had opted to not claim it

Children of Belarusian SSR citizens born in the territory of the Belarusian SSR acquired citizenship at the time of birth. If only one parent held Belarusian SSR citizenship, then the citizenship of the child was determined by joint declaration of his or her parents. Without such a declaration, the child acquired citizenship of the Belarusian SSR automatically, while still retaining the right to acquire the citizenship of the non-Byelorussian parent upon becoming adult.

According to the Code of Marriage, family and guardianship of Belarusian SSR promulgated in 1927:

- children of Belarusian SSR citizens acquired citizenship by birth
- children of a Belarusian SSR citizen and a non-citizen acquired citizenship by birth if one of the parents had permanent residence in the Belarusian SSR
- children of a Belarusian SSR citizen and a non-citizen who were living abroad acquired citizenship by birth upon joint declaration of the parents

The Citizenship Act of the USSR (1930) and the Citizenship Act of the USSR (1931) declared that citizens of the USSR who lived in the territory of a Soviet Republic would become citizens of that Republic, unless they chose citizenship of another Soviet Republic in connection with their ethnic origin.

Up to the dissolution of Soviet Union, citizenship legislation became increasingly centralised. Legal norms regarding Belarusian citizenship by birth were revoked in order to bring Belarusian family law in accordance with the Principles of Legislation on Marriage and the Family of the USSR and the Union Republics (1968).

=== Belarusian citizenship from 1991 to 2002 ===
The first citizenship act after the Belarusian declaration of independence was adopted on 18 October 1991.

The Citizenship Act (1991) has not declared succession of citizenship of the Byelorussian SSR. Citizens of the USSR who had permanently resided in Belarus were recognized by the Act as citizens of the Republic of Belarus.

Belarusian citizenship could be acquired:

- by birth
- by naturalization
- by registration (since June 1993 amendments)

Citizenship by birth could be acquired if both of the parents were citizens of the Republic of Belarus. The same applied if only one of the parents was a citizen of Belarus and at the same time the child was born in Belarus, or in the case where at least one of his parents had permanent residence in Belarus. Citizenship was also granted to a child that was born in Belarus to stateless parents.

Citizenship by naturalization could be gained if the applicant:

- had permanent residence in Belarus for 7 years preceding application
- had sufficient knowledge of one of the state languages (Belarusian or Russian)
- had a legal source of income in Belarus

== Citizenship Act (2002) ==
=== Acquisition of citizenship ===
Belarusian citizenship can be acquired:

- by birth
- by naturalization
- by registration

Citizenship by birth can be acquired by a child if one of the parents is a Belarusian citizen or both of them are permanent residents of Belarus.

Citizenship by naturalization can be gained if the applicant:

- had permanent residence in Belarus for 7 years preceding the application
- has enough knowledge of one of the state languages (Belarusian or Russian)
- has legal income
- has no foreign citizenship, or will lose the foreign citizenship after acquisition of Belarusian citizenship, or has renounced their citizenship

The required period of residence can be reduced for several categories of people, including ethnic Belarusians, the descendants of ethnic Belarusians born abroad, people who held Belarusian citizenship in the past, and people who have made significant contributions to development of Belarus.

Citizenship by registration can be acquired by:

- people who held USSR citizenship and were born in Belarus, or had a place of residence in Belarus before 12 November 1991, as well as their spouses who held Soviet citizenship and their descendants
- a child of a Belarusian citizen
- an adopted child

=== Termination of citizenship ===
Belarusian citizenship can be terminated by: renunciation and loss of citizenship, such as by entering the military service, police service or government service in another state.

According to the Nationality Act, only persons 18 years and older may renounce their citizenship, as long as they possess another citizenship or guarantee of acquisition thereof, do not have any debts or unfulfilled obligations and are not under criminal prosecution. Under 18s must have a renouncing application submitted by their parent(s).

In practice, not completing military service can be used as grounds for refusing renunciation, even for minors, as it is considered an 'unfulfilled obligation'.

== Visa requirements ==
Visa requirements for Belarusian citizens Belarus Free movement (Union State) Visa free access Visa on arrival eVisa Visa available both on arrival or online Visa required prior to arrival

In 2024, Belarusian citizens had visa-free or visa on arrival access to 81 countries and territories, ranking the Belarusian passport 66th in terms of travel freedom according to the Henley Passport Index. Possession of a Belarusian passport is compulsory under the law.

== See also ==
- Belarusian passport
- Visa policy of Belarus
- Visa requirements for Belarusian citizens
