= Visa policy of Belarus =

Policy on permits required to enter Belarus

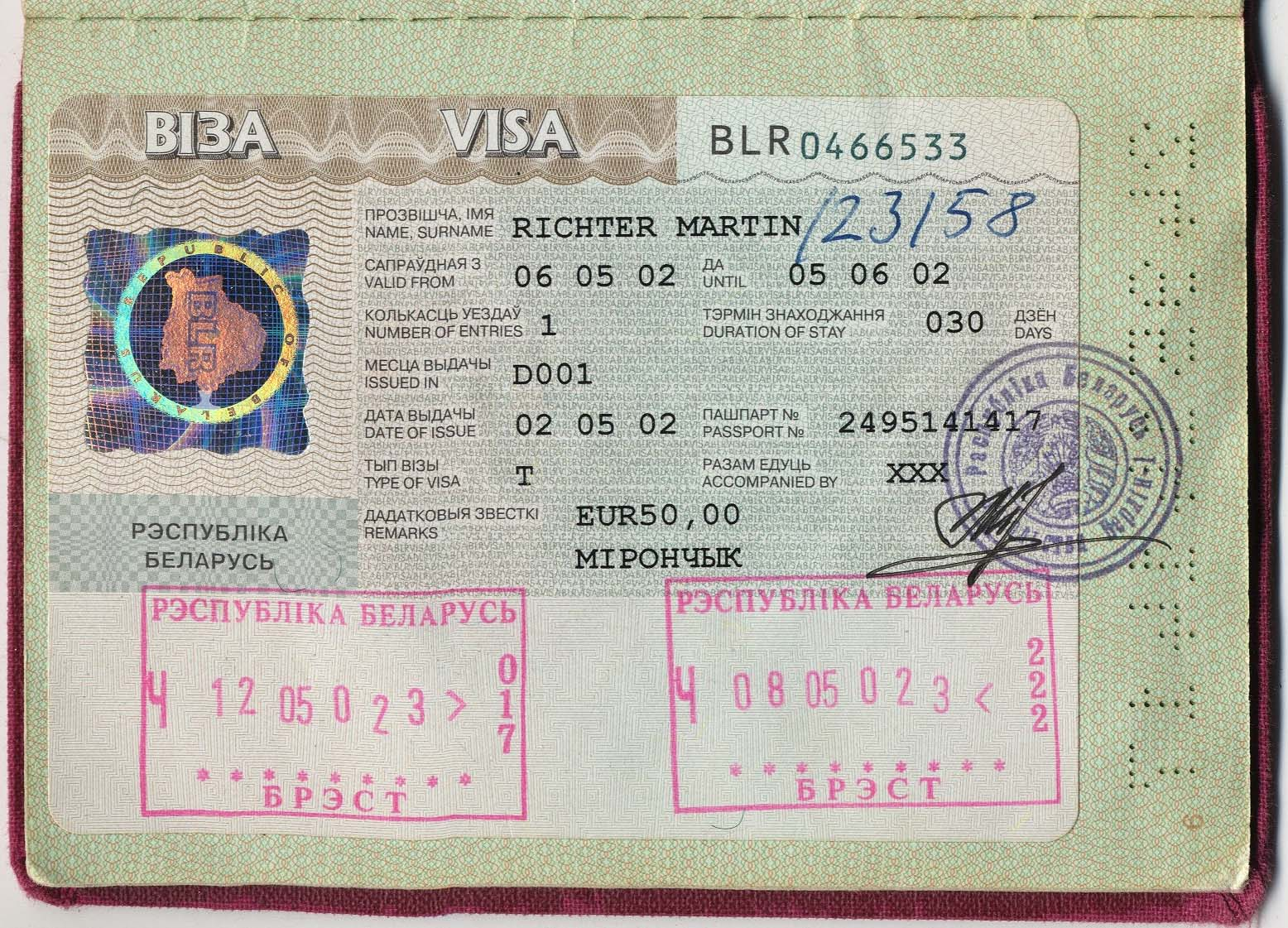
Belarusian visa issued to a German citizen, 2002

Visitors to Belarus must obtain a visa from one of the Belarusian diplomatic missions unless they are citizens of one of the visa-exempt countries.

Belarus's visa and other migration policies are also implemented in accordance with the mobility rights arrangements within the Commonwealth of Independent States and the rules of the Single Economic Space of the Eurasian Economic Union.

In 2024, Belarus received 6.6 million international arrivals, 80% of which were Russians; many of the others were from China.

== Visa policy map ==
External image
- Map of international land border crossings of Belarus

Visa policy of Belarus Belarus Freedom of movement Visa not required (90 days) Visa not required (30 days) Visa not required (30 days, only by air) Visa not required (30 days, only by air, substitute visa required) eVisa Visa required

== Mutual recognition of visas between Russia and Belarus ==
Holders of a valid visa or residence permit of either Belarus or Russia and a mutually recognized identity document may enter both countries, within the validity of the visa; however, this policy does not apply to e-visas. In cases where one country has a visa-free regime and the other requires a visa, the person must hold both the ID document and a visa for the latter.

Foreign nationals with temporary permanent residency or a document for attending an international event have the right to enter, exit, stay, and transit without a visa within the validity of their documents.

Stay duration is calculated from entry into one country from a third state.

The common visa does not apply to individuals restricted from entering either country. Officials retain the right to deny entry or reduce the duration of stay for any foreign national or stateless person, as well as to check compliance with entry, exit, transit, or stay regulations.

Crossing between Belarus and Russia via land is allowed only at the following 6 international border crossing points:

- Yukhovichi – Dolossy (Opochka – Novopolotsk)
- Yezeryshche – Nevel (Kyiv – St. Petersburg)
- Lyozno – Kruglovka (Vitebsk – Smolensk)
- Redki – Krasnaya Gorka (Minsk – Moscow)
- Zvenchatka – Dubovichka (Bobruisk – Moscow)
- Selishche – Novozybkov (Gomel – Bryansk)

== Visa exemption ==
=== Via economic integration and international treaties ===
Special travel conditions and exceptions to the usual rules, including special migration rules for foreign citizens, their family members and conditions for the provision of medical care are provided through international agreements and treaties to the following foreign citizens. The conditions for citizens of a specific country should be clarified in advance because not all countries are parties to all agreements.

- Union State of Russia and Belarus
- The rules of the Single Economic Space of the Eurasian Economic Union (Armenia, Russia, Kazakhstan, Kyrgyzstan)
- Mobility rights arrangements of the Commonwealth of Independent States (present and former countries of the Commonwealth of Independent States, including Ukraine and Georgia, but not Turkmenistan)

=== Ordinary passports ===
Citizens of the following countries and territories may enter Belarus without a visa for the following period:

Freedom of movement

- Russia^{IP}

90 days

- Argentina^{2}
- Armenia^{2}
- Azerbaijan^{2}
- Brazil^{2}
- Colombia^{2}
- Georgia^{2}
- Israel^{1}
- Kazakhstan^{2}
- Kyrgyzstan^{2}
- Moldova^{2}
- Mongolia^{2}
- Nicaragua^{2}
- Tajikistan^{2}
- Ukraine^{A 1}
- United Arab Emirates
- Uzbekistan^{2}
- Venezuela

30 days

- Albania^{2}
- China^{B 2}
- Cuba
- Ecuador^{2}
- Hong Kong^{B}
- Laos^{2}
- Macau^{B C 2}
- Myanmar^{2}
- Oman^{2}
- Qatar
- Saint Kitts and Nevis^{2}
- Serbia^{2}
- Turkey^{2}
- Vietnam^{2}

Temporary regime (until 31 December 2026):

30 days

- All European Union member states^{D E 2}
- Andorra^{2}
- Bosnia and Herzegovina^{2}
- Iceland^{2}
- Liechtenstein^{2}
- Monaco^{2}
- North Macedonia^{2}
- Norway^{2}
- San Marino^{2}
- Switzerland^{2}
- United Kingdom^{2}
- Vatican City^{2}

_{IP - Internal passport accepted.}
_{A - Citizens of Ukraine could be subject to interrogation by the State Security Committee of the Republic of Belarus upon entering Belarus.}
_{B - For Chinese citizens with People's Republic of China passports, Hong Kong Special Administrative Region passports or Macao Special Administrative Region passports.}
_{C - For holders of Macao Special Administrative Region Travel Permis regardless of their nationality.}
_{D - Citizens of Latvia, Lithuania and Poland can enter for a period of 90 days instead.}
_{E - Including non-citizens in Estonia or Latvia.}
_{1 - No more than 90 days within any 180 days.}
_{2 - No more than 90 days within a calendar year.}

Date of visa changes

Citizens of Armenia (2003), Azerbaijan (2007), Georgia (1992), Kazakhstan (2002), Kyrgyzstan (2002), Moldova, Russia (2002), Tajikistan (2002), Ukraine (2010), Uzbekistan (2006) have never required a visa to enter Belarus. However, visa-free agreements have been signed with these states.

- 26 April 1990 (signed as USSR): North Macedonia (signed as Yugoslavia)
- 10 March 1999: Cuba
- 10 February 2000: Serbia
- 19 June 2008: Venezuela
- 14 June 2011: Qatar
- 4 September 2013: Mongolia
- 1 June 2014: Turkey
- 13 February 2015: Ecuador
- 26 November 2015: Israel
- 30 April 2016: United Arab Emirates
- 25 November 2016: Brazil
- 27 November 2016: Macao
- 19 May 2017: Argentina
- 13 February 2018: Hong Kong (length of stay extended on 10 April 2019)
- 10 August 2018: China
- 23 August 2019: Saint Kitts and Nevis
- 15 July 2020: Albania
- 14 February 2024: Nicaragua
- 30 January 2025: Vietnam
- 9 April 2025: Colombia
- 15 January 2026: Laos
- 17 March 2026: Oman
- 8 July 2026: Myanmar

Cancelled:

- Bulgaria, Czech Republic, Estonia, Hungary, Latvia, Lithuania, Romania : Unknown
- Turkmenistan : 19 July 1999
- Slovakia : 1 January 2001
- Poland : 1 October 2003
- Montenegro : 1 November 2026

==== Visa exemption by air ====
Effective 17 October 2021, citizens of 76 countries may enter Belarus visa‑free for up to 30 days, if arriving and exiting exclusively through the international airports of Minsk, Brest, Gomel, Grodno, Mogilev, or Vitebsk. The 30‑day period is counted in calendar days. This policy applies to holders of ordinary passports. The policy was first implemented on 9 January 2017, but was twice expanded.

The visa-free policy for air arrivals does not apply to passengers directly coming from or going to the Russian Federation, in which case a Belarusian visa, traditional or electronic, is required.

Travellers must carry required documents, including a valid passport, proof of medical insurance, and proof of sufficient funds. Registration is required for stays exceeding 10 days in length. Visitors may depart from any of the international airports that participate in the policy; departure by other methods such as by train is not permitted. The number of visa-free entries is unlimited. By November 2017, 54,000 foreigners visited Belarus through the visa-free program.

- All European Union member states^{1}

- Andorra
- Antigua and Barbuda
- Australia
- Barbados
- Bahrain
- Bosnia and Herzegovina
- Canada
- Chile
- Dominica
- El Salvador
- Iceland
- Indonesia
- Japan
- Kuwait
- Liechtenstein
- Malaysia
- Mexico
- Micronesia
- Monaco
- New Zealand
- Nicaragua
- North Macedonia
- Norway
- Oman
- Panama
- Peru
- Saint Vincent and the Grenadines
- San Marino
- Saudi Arabia
- Seychelles
- Singapore
- South Korea
- Switzerland
- United Kingdom
- Uruguay
- Vanuatu
- Vatican City

Conditional^{2}

- Egypt
- Gambia
- Haiti
- India
- Iran
- Jordan
- Lebanon
- Namibia
- Pakistan
- Samoa
- South Africa

_{1 - Including non-citizen residents of Estonia and Latvia.}
_{2 - Only if they have a multiple-entry visa (i.e., a "C" or "D" visa) issued by any Schengen Area member state, Cyprus or Ireland, an entry stamp from one of these countries and a valid air ticket with departure from the airports located in Minsk, Brest, Vitebsk, Gomel, Grodno and Mogilev.}

Since 2021, a visa is required for citizens of the United States to travel to Belarus.

==== Regional visa-free regime ====
===== Brest-Grodno visa-free territory =====
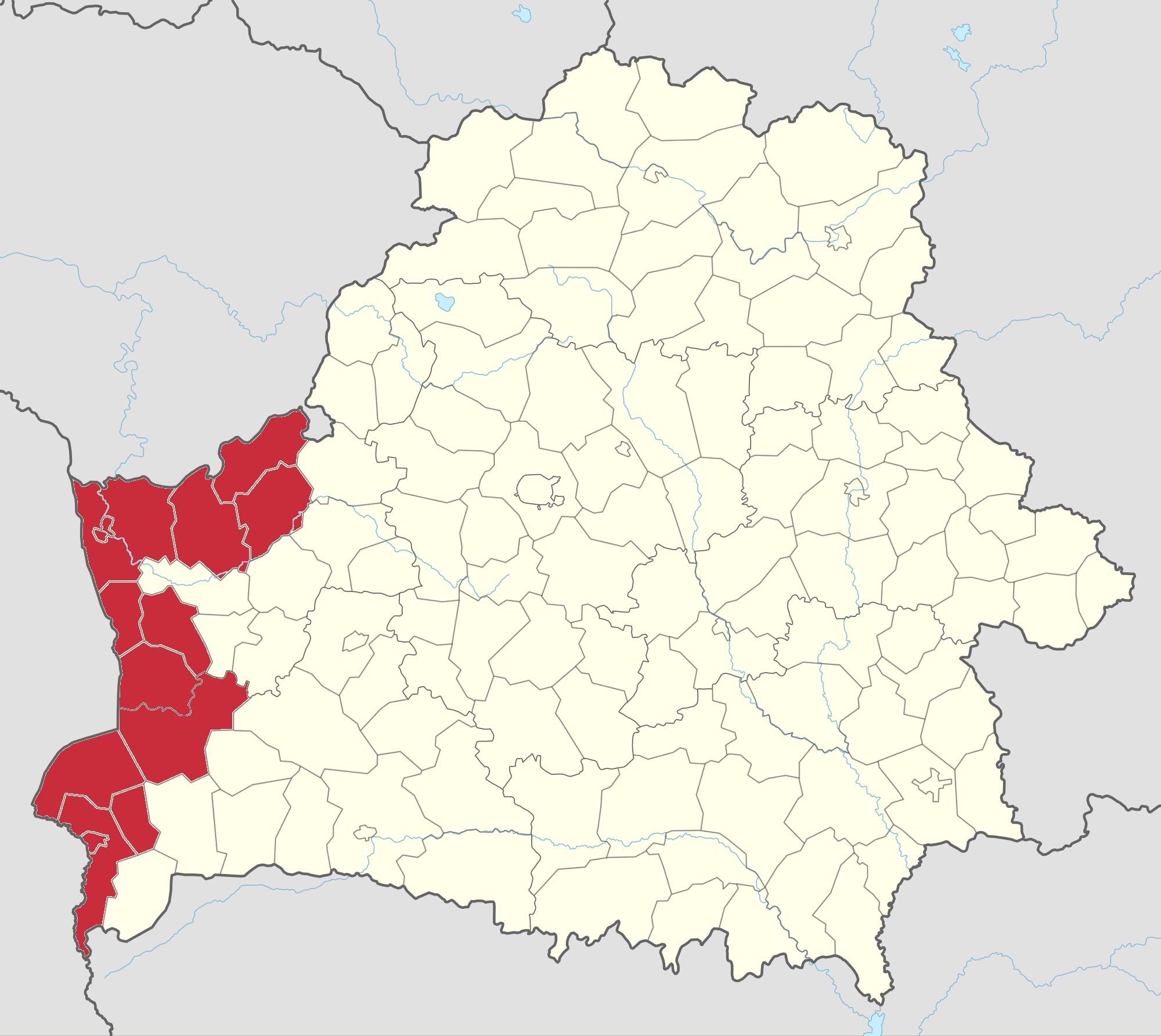
Parts of Belarus covered by Brest and Grodno regional visa-free provisions

Since November 2019, citizens that qualify for the visa-free program through the Minsk National Airport may visit a visa-free zone in the Brest Region and the Grodno Region for 15 days without a visa. However, only the border between Terespol in Poland and Brest is open to passenger traffic.

The visa-free zone consists of the following territories:

- parts of Brest Region
  - Brest
  - Brest District
  - Kamieniec District
  - Pružany District
  - Žabinka District
- parts of Grodno Region
  - Grodno
  - Bierastavica District
  - Hrodna District
  - Lida District
  - Ščučyn District
  - Svislač District
  - Vaŭkavysk District
  - Voranava District
- Parts of Grodno and Brest regions not listed above – when traveling on a tourist route as a member of an organised travel group.

The legislation superseded the previous decrees that established two separate visa-free zones: Brest area including Belovezhskaya Pushcha National Park (since June 2015) and Augustów Canal area including Grodno (since October 2016).

=== Non-ordinary passports ===
Holders of diplomatic or official/service passports of the following countries and territories may enter Belarus without a visa for the following period:

Freedom of movement

- Russia^{IP}

90 days

- All European Union member states^{BD 1}

- Algeria^{D}
- Argentina^{2}
- Armenia^{2}
- Angola^{D 1}
- Azerbaijan^{2}
- Bangladesh^{D}
- Bolivia
- Brazil^{2}
- Chile^{2}
- Colombia^{2}
- Ecuador^{2}
- Egypt
- El Salvador
- Georgia^{2}
- Guatemala
- Iran^{2}
- Iraq^{1}
- Kazakhstan^{2}
- Kyrgyzstan^{2}
- Moldova^{2}
- Mongolia^{2}
- Myanmar^{D}
- Nicaragua^{2}
- North Korea^{2}
- Pakistan^{D} ^{2}
- Peru
- Singapore
- South Africa^{2}
- South Korea
- Tajikistan^{2}
- Ukraine^{1}
- United Arab Emirates
- Uruguay^{2}
- Uzbekistan^{2}
- Venezuela

30 days

- Cambodia^{D}
- China^{2}
- Cuba
- India^{D}
- Laos^{D 2}
- Lebanon^{D}
- Montenegro^{1}
- Oman^{2}
- Qatar
- Saint Kitts and Nevis^{2}
- Serbia^{2}
- Sri Lanka^{D}
- Syria
- Turkey^{2}
- Turkmenistan
- Vietnam^{2}

_{BD - For holders of biometric diplomatic passports only.}
_{D - For holders of diplomatic passports only.}
_{1 - No more than 90 days within any 180-day period.}
_{2 - No more than 90 days within a calendar year.}

=== Future changes ===
Belarus has signed visa exemption agreements with the following countries, but they are not yet in force:

Country	Passports	Agreement signed on
Nepal	Diplomatic, official, service	27 September 2026
Maldives	All	24 September 2026
Ghana	Diplomatic, service	08 June 2026

=== Additional requirements ===
All visitors are required to have an adequate health insurance.

== Electronic visa (e-Visa) ==
An e-Visa for stays up to 30 days is available for citizens of the following 68 countries. Visitors may enter Belarus with an e-visa at all international checkpoints. The fee is €35 for citizens of European Union member states (except Denmark and Ireland) and €60 for citizens of other regions. It is free for Japanese citizens, citizens of European Union member states under the age of 12, and citizens of other regions under the age of 14. Everyone must pay a service fee of €6.

- European Union member states (Note: including holders of an alien passport of Estonia and holders of a non-citizen passport of Latvia.)

- Andorra
- Antigua and Barbuda
- Australia
- Bahrain
- Barbados
- Bolivia
- Bosnia and Herzegovina
- Canada
- Chile
- Colombia
- Dominica
- El Salvador
- Iceland
- India
- Indonesia
- Japan
- Kuwait
- Liechtenstein
- Malaysia
- Mexico
- Micronesia
- Monaco
- New Zealand
- North Macedonia
- Norway
- Oman
- Panama
- Paraguay
- Peru
- Saint Vincent and the Grenadines
- San Marino
- Saudi Arabia
- Seychelles
- Singapore
- South Korea
- Switzerland
- United Kingdom
- United States
- Uruguay
- Vanuatu
- Vatican City

== See also ==
- Belarus–Russia border
- Visa requirements for Belarusian citizens
