= Forced deportation from Belarus =

Forced deportation from Belarus (also characterized by human rights defenders as forced expatriation) is the practice of forcibly removing citizens of the Republic of Belarus outside the country, used by the authorities as a tool of political repression against opponents of the Lukashenko regime.

This practice contradicts Article 10 of the Constitution of Belarus, which guarantees that a citizen cannot be expelled from the state or extradited to a foreign state. International law, particularly the Rome Statute of the International Criminal Court, classifies deportation or the forcible transfer of a population as a crime against humanity.

== 2020 events ==
The widespread use of forced deportation began during and after the 2020 Belarusian presidential election. The authorities used threats and physical pressure to remove protest leaders from the country.

=== Expulsion of Sviatlana Tsikhanouskaya ===
On 10 August 2020, presidential candidate Sviatlana Tsikhanouskaya visited the Central Election Commission (CEC) to file a complaint regarding the voting results. There, she had a conversation with representatives of the security forces, after which she was escorted out of the building and forcibly taken to the border with Lithuania. It later became known that the operation was conducted under the control of the special services, and Tsikhanouskaya herself agreed to leave under the pressure of threats against her children and allies. This incident became the first high-profile precedent of the forced expulsion of a political leader during the 2020 crisis.

=== Attempted deportation of Maria Kalesnikava ===
In September 2020, the authorities attempted to implement a similar scenario against another opposition leader, Maria Kalesnikava. On 7 September, she was kidnapped in Minsk, and on the night of 8 September, she was forcibly brought to the Belarus–Ukraine border along with other members of the Coordination Council—Anton Radniankou and Ivan Krautsou. To avoid expulsion, Kalesnikava tore up her passport in the neutral zone and climbed out of the car through a window, refusing to cross the border. As a result, she was detained by Belarusian border guards and later sentenced to a lengthy prison term. Her act became a symbol of resistance against forced deportation.

=== Situation with Archbishop Tadeusz Kondrusiewicz ===
On 31 August 2020, the Metropolitan of Minsk-Mahiliou, Archbishop Tadeusz Kondrusiewicz, a Belarusian citizen, was stopped by Belarusian border guards at the Kuznica-Bruzgi border crossing while returning from a pastoral trip to Poland. He was denied entry into the country without explanation, despite the fact that the Constitution of Belarus guarantees citizens the right to unhindered return to their homeland. The hierarch was forced to return to Poland.

Aleksandr Lukashenko later commented on the situation, claiming that Kondrusiewicz had supposedly received "certain tasks" in Warsaw and had "gotten into politics." It was also stated that the Ministry of Internal Affairs had invalidated the Archbishop's passport, which became the formal reason for refusing him passage across the border. In reality, the Lukashenko regime did not forgive the Metropolitan for his principled moral stance during the socio-political crisis: he had openly called for fair elections, condemned police violence by calling spilled blood a "grave sin," and even visited the Okrestina detention center to pray for the victims of torture.

The Archbishop remained in exile for nearly four months, managing the church remotely. The situation was resolved only after the intervention of the Vatican: a special envoy of the Pope, Claudio Gugerotti, visited Minsk and delivered a letter from Pope Francis to Lukashenko. On 24 December 2020, on the eve of Catholic Christmas, Tadeusz Kondrusiewicz was able to return to Belarus. Shortly after his return, on his 75th birthday on 3 January 2021, he submitted his resignation, which was accepted by the Pope.

== Deportation of political prisoners (2021–2025) ==
In the following years, the practice of expulsion transformed into a mechanism for releasing political prisoners through pardons conditioned on immediate departure abroad.

=== Isolated cases ===
In September 2022, a precedent was set with the release of Radio Liberty journalist Aleh Hruzdzilovich. His release and departure were the result of efforts by American diplomats. Later, other political prisoners who did not have dual citizenship were deported in the same way, such as journalist Andrey Kuznechyk in February 2025. Such operations followed a specific pattern: removal from prison, transportation to the border, and handover to representatives of a foreign state without formally processing the legal procedure of deportation.

=== Mass deportation of 2025 ===
In the second half of 2025, the process took on a mass character following negotiations between Aleksandr Lukashenko and the US administration of Donald Trump. The Belarusian authorities agreed to release a significant number of political prisoners on the condition of their complete removal from the country. Lukashenko publicly commented on this with the words: "Take them to your place, take them there."

On 11 September and 13 December 2025, large-scale stages of deportation took place, during which hundreds of people were removed from prisons, including prominent politicians, journalists, and activists. The process resembled a special operation: prisoners were taken out of their cells, often with bags over their heads and in handcuffs, and transported to the border with Lithuania or Ukraine.

The leader of the Narodnaya Hramada party, Mikola Statkevich, similarly to Maria Kalesnikava in 2020, categorically refused to leave the country, stating that "a moral leader must live in Belarus." Following his refusal, he was returned to his place of imprisonment by the Lukashenko regime.

== Legal and social consequences ==
Lawyers and human rights defenders note that such actions by the authorities are not an act of humanism, but a form of repression. Citizens are faced with a choice: remain in prison or be exiled from their homeland without the right to return. Many deported individuals were deprived of their documents (passports were destroyed or confiscated), which created a legal vacuum for them in their countries of arrival and caused problems with legalization, employment, and receiving social assistance.

Pavel Sapelka, an expert at the Viasna Human Rights Centre, emphasizes that forced expulsion from the country violates fundamental human rights, including the right to enter one's own country, which is guaranteed by the International Covenant on Civil and Political Rights. This practice is often compared to the expulsion of Soviet dissidents during the era of the Soviet Union.
