= Belarusian passport =

Travel document

- The front cover of a contemporary Belarusian biometric passport
- Type: Passport
- Issued by: (Belarus) Ministry of Internal Affairs
- First issued: 1996; 2006 (updated); 2021 (biometric)
- Purpose: Identification
- Eligibility: Belarusian citizenship
- Expiration: 10 years

A Belarusian passport (Belarusian: беларускі пашпарт, romanized: biełaruski pašpart; Russian: белорусский паспорт, romanized: belorusskiy pasport) is issued to citizens of Belarus. The 1996 and 2006 series are used for both external and internal travel. Since 2021, ID cards are issued for internal uses, and biometric passports are issued for external travel, but the 1996 and 2006 series are still valid both externally and internally. Passports are issued by the Ministry of Internal Affairs in Belarus and by the Ministry of Foreign Affairs to citizens who live abroad.

"AB" series passports are assigned to Brest Region, "BM" series passports - Vitebsk Region, "HB" series passports - Gomel Region, "KH" series passports - Grodno Region, "MP" series passports - Minsk city, "MC" series passports - Minsk Region, "KB" series passports - Mogilev Region, "PP" series passports are assigned to the Ministry of Foreign Affairs.

Passports can be issued to citizens at any age. Upon turning 14, every citizen is encouraged to obtain a passport. Belarusian passports have blue covers.

Article 14 of the "Treaty on the Union between Belarus and Russia" expects the future introduction of identity documents of the Union State.

== History ==
Until Belarus established its independence, Soviet passports were used. In spite of the fact that Byelorussian SSR citizenship (like citizenship of all other soviet republics) was recognised by the USSR, Soviet passports never mentioned Byelorussian SSR citizenship. Soviet passports issued by the Ministry of Internal Affairs in the Byelorussian SSR (as well as birth certificates) had records in both Belarusian and Russian.

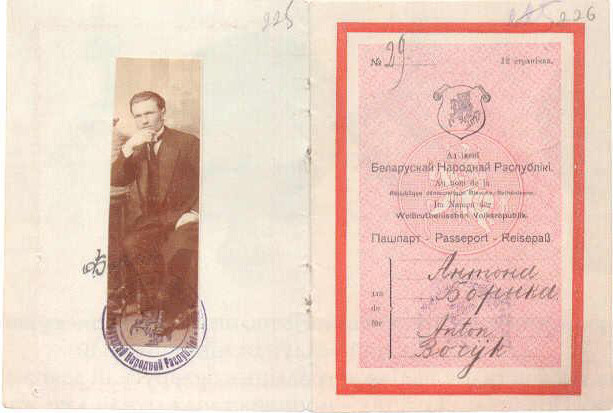
1918

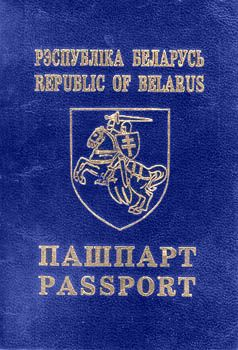
1993-1996

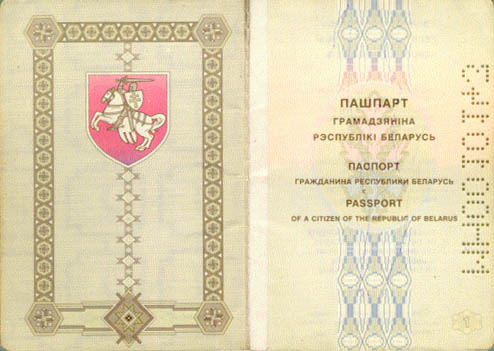
1993-1996
2006 passport

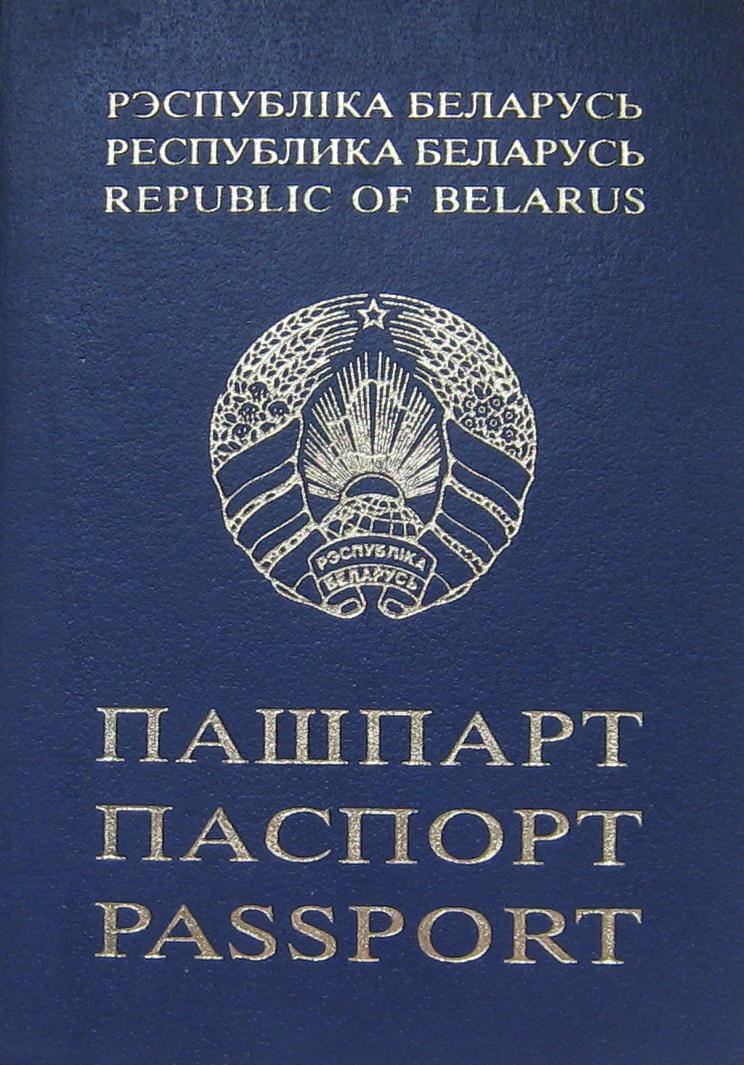
Cover

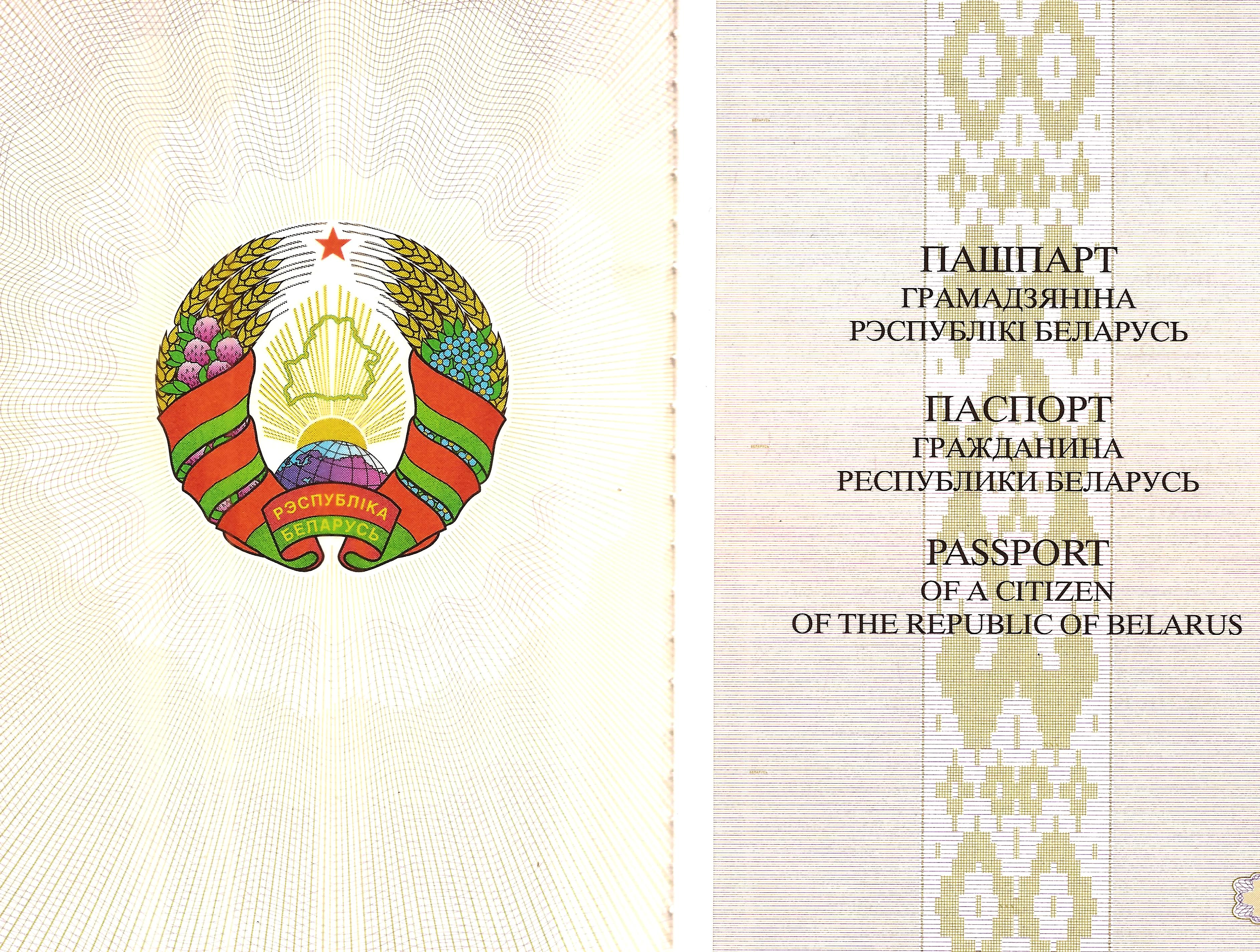
First pages of a passport containing coat of arms and the words "Passport of a citizen of the Republic of Belarus" in Belarusian, Russian and English.

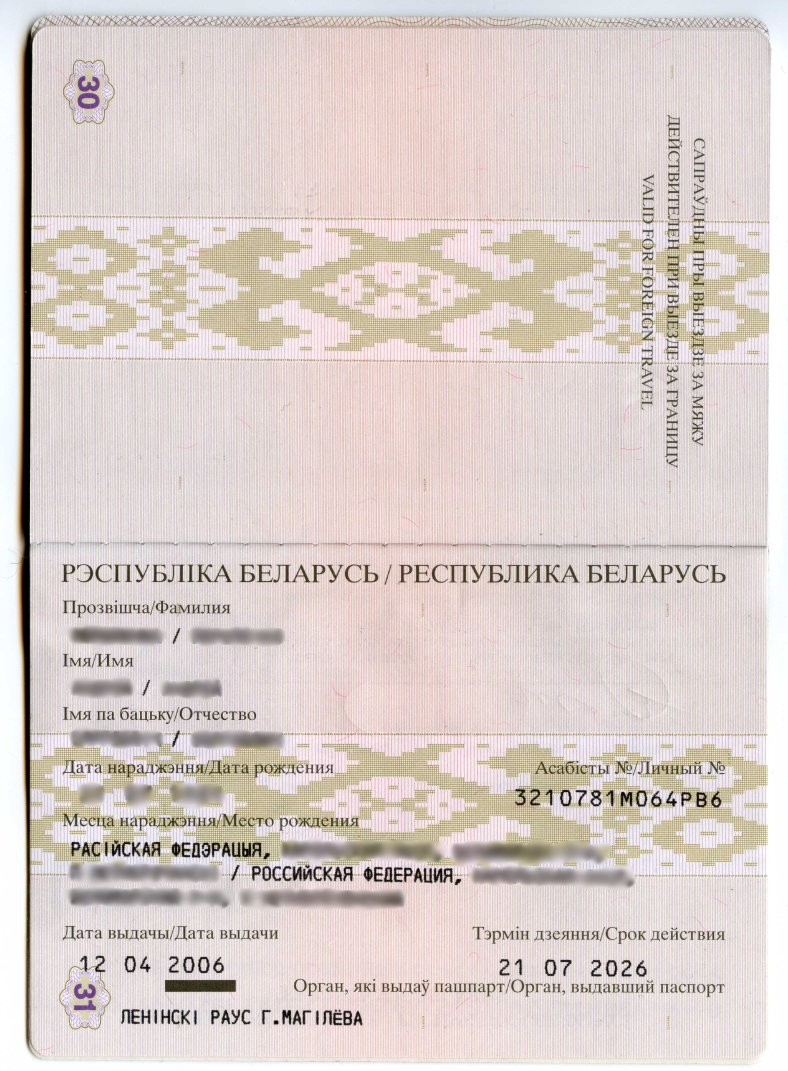
Pages 30-31 of a passport with records in Belarusian and Russian (surname, name, patronymic name, date of birth, personal number, place of birth, date of issue, date of expiry and issuing authority).

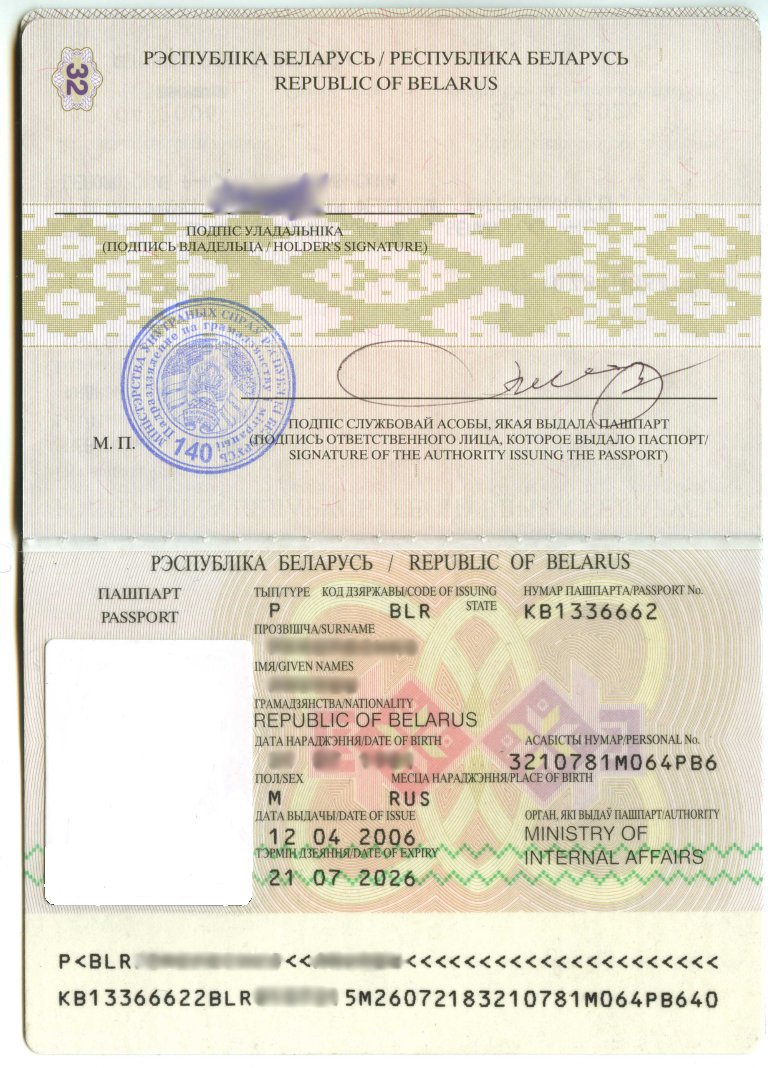
Last pages of a passport.

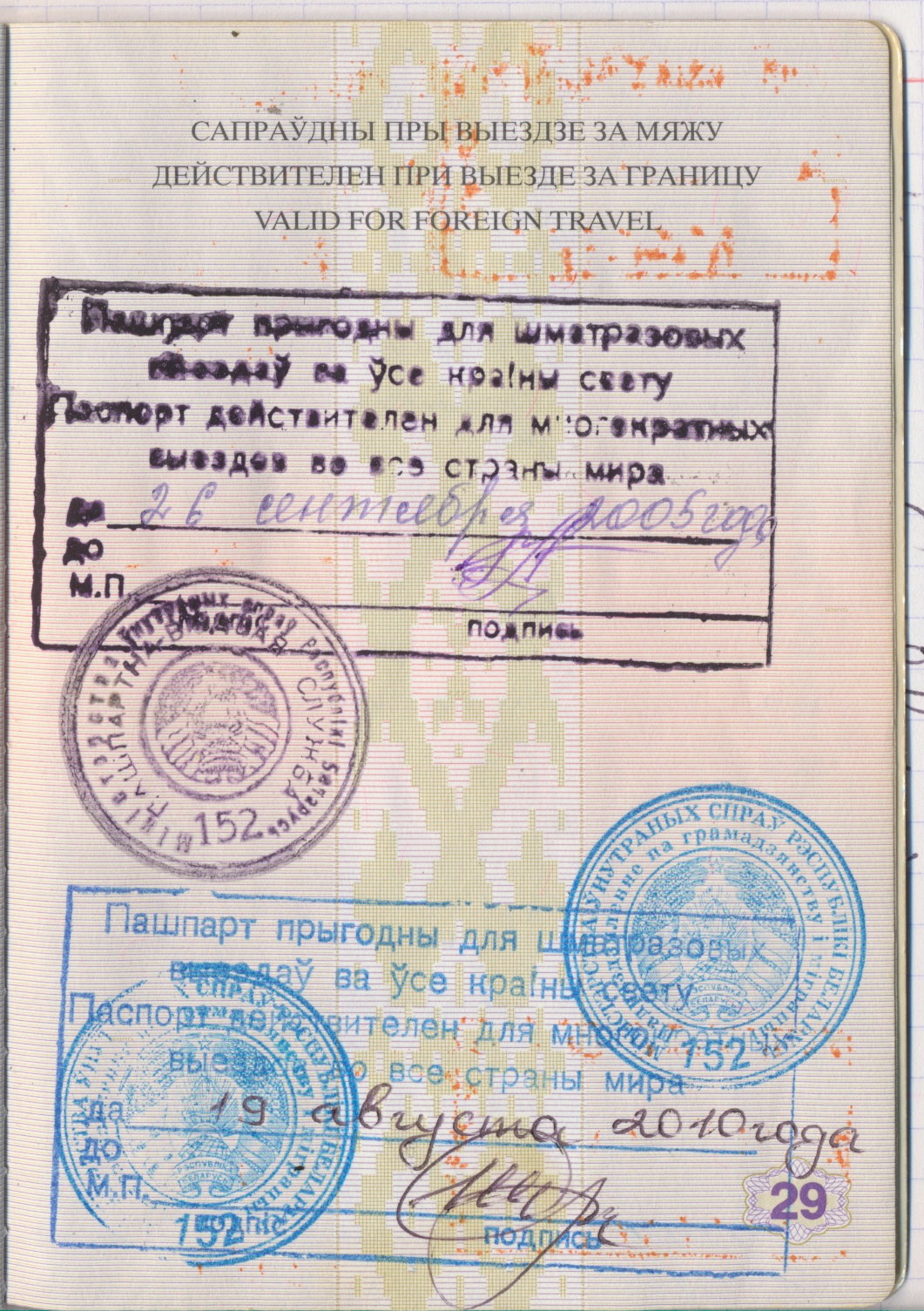
Page 29 of a passport with two foreign travel permission stamps.
2021 biometric passport

Cover

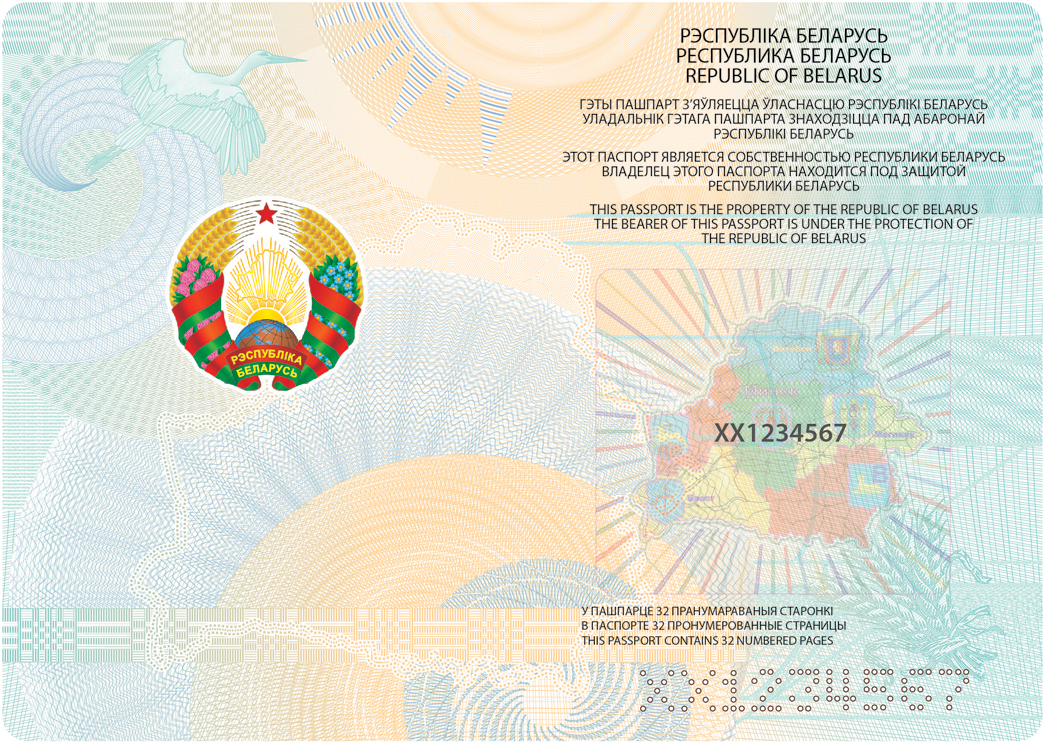
First page

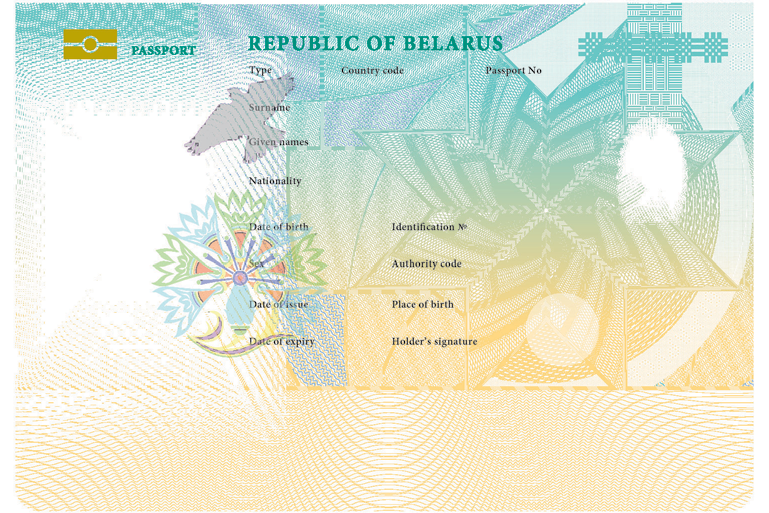
Page with personal info

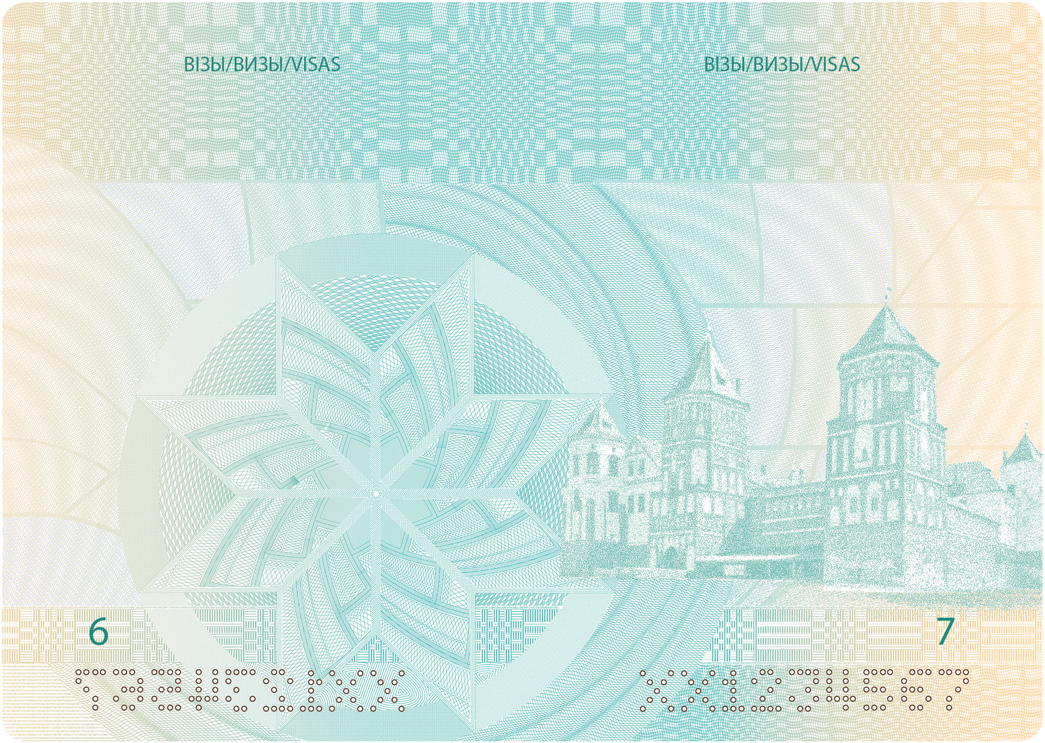
Pages 6-7

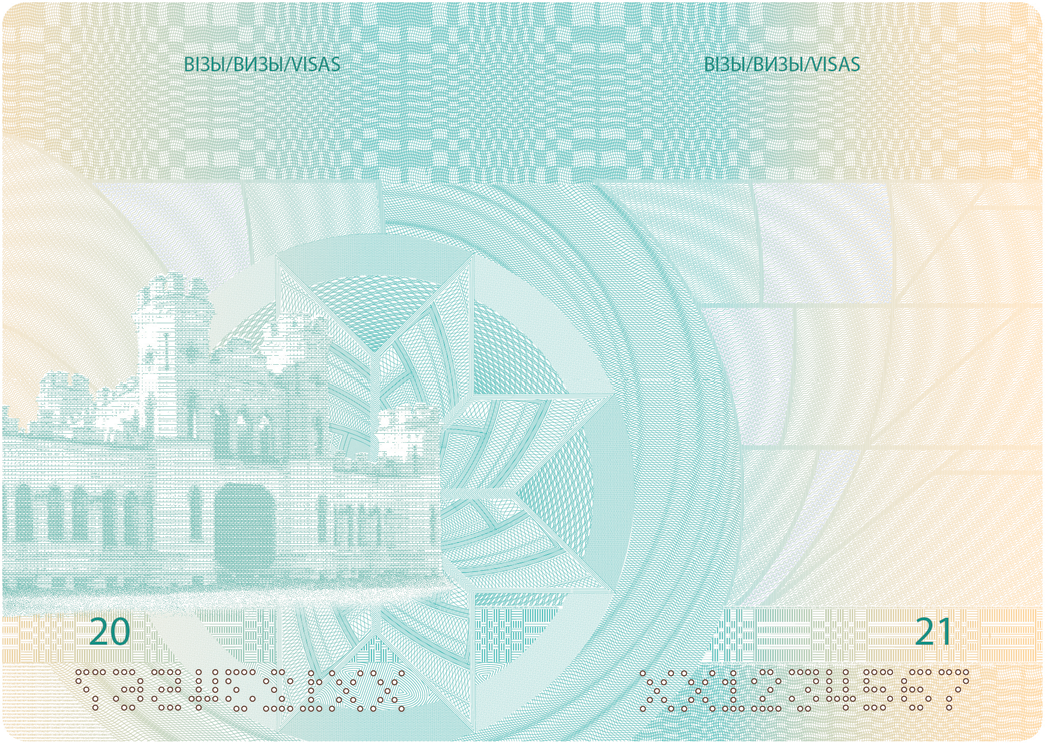
Pages 20-21

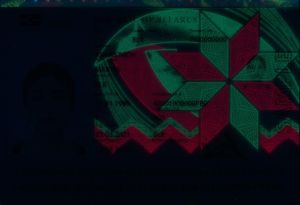
Integrated biodata card under UV light

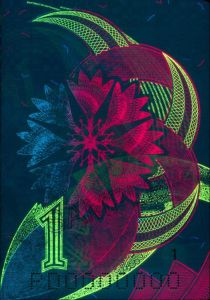
Page 1 under UV light

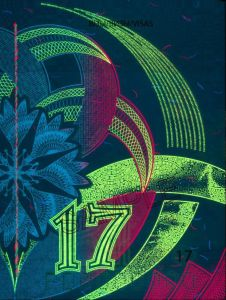
Page 17 under UV light

== Information ==
A Belarusian passport contains the following information, printed in Belarusian, Russian and English:

- Given name, surname and patronymic name (the latter only in Belarusian and Russian)
- Date of birth
- Identification number
- Sex
- Place of birth
- Date of issue
- Date of expiry
- Authority
- Holder's signature
- Signature of the authority issuing the Passport
- Code of issuing state (BLR)
- Official seal
- Place of residence
- Visas (if any)
- Consular stamps (for those who live abroad)
- Information about children under 16 (if any)
- Information regarding marital status and the spouse's details (if any)

== Moving abroad permission stamps ==
Before 1 January 2008, Belarusian citizens had to apply for permission stamps in their passports in order to cross Belarusian borders. Permission stamps were given if there were no specific legal restrictions for their moving abroad.

In 2002, the Constitutional Court of Belarus stated in its decision that permission stamps were not constitutional. The Council of Ministers was ordered to propose a different kind of a citizen border control by 31 December 2005.

By a Presidential decree issued on 17 December 2007, permission stamps were finally abolished.

== Visa requirements ==
Belarus Free movement (Union State) Visa free access Visa on arrival eVisa Visa available both on arrival or online Visa required prior to arrival

As of 6 May 2025, Belarusian citizens had visa-free or visa on arrival access to 81 countries and territories, ranking the Belarusian passport 62nd in terms of travel freedom according to the Henley Passport Index.

== See also ==
- Belarusian citizenship
- Visa policy of Belarus
- Visa requirements for Belarusian citizens
- New Belarus passport project
