= Belarus-Russia Customs Union =

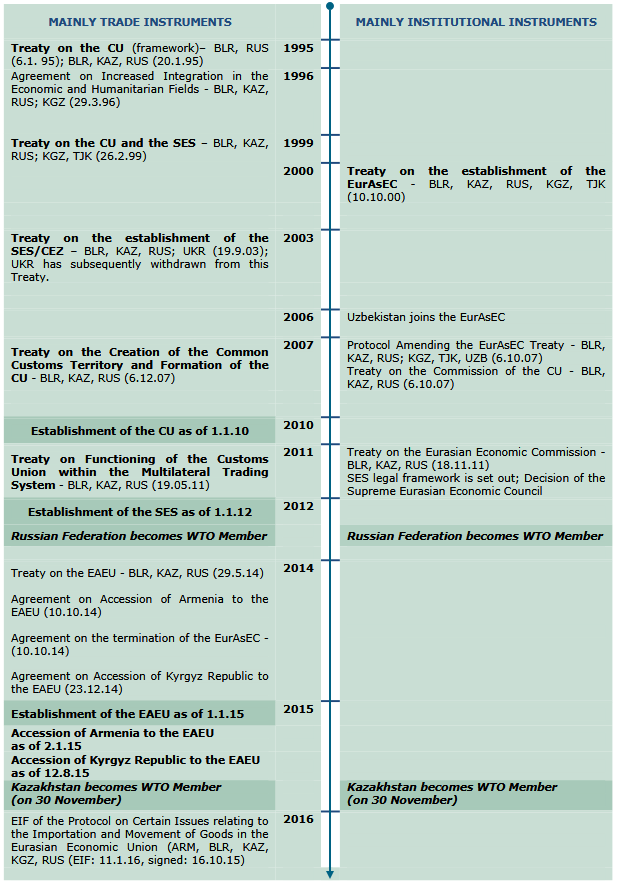
Timeline of EAEU Integration from the World Trade Organization report

The Agreement on Customs Union between the Russian Federation and the Republic of Belarus (Соглашение о Таможенном союзе между Российской Федерацией и Республикой Беларусь от 6 января 1995 года) was concluded in Minsk on 6 January 1995 between the Government of the Russian Federation by Viktor Chernomyrdin and the Government of the Republic of Belarus by Sergey Ling in two original copies in the Russian and Belarusian languages, both texts being equally authentic. According to the website of the Eurasian Economic Union, "Applies to the extent not contradicting the Treaty on the Eurasian Economic Union of 29 May 2014". The Depositaries are the Republic of Belarus and the Russian Federation.

However, a customs union without a common external tariff is not a real customs union, so the full-scale launch of the customs union took place only on 1 January 2010. A 2004 International Monetary Fund publication noted that it was not a customs union (which requires a common external tariff) but a free trade area (as of 2004).

The Union State of Russia and Belarus is described as the integration core within the Eurasian Economic Union and post-Soviet economic integration.

== Background ==
According to Article 7 of the Agreement on the creation the Commonwealth of Independent States of 8 December 1991, the High Contracting Parties indicate that through common coordinating institutions, their joint activities will consist in coordinating foreign policy activities, cooperation in the formation and development of a common economic space, common European and Eurasian markets, in the field of customs policy, in the development of transport and communication systems, cooperation in the field of environmental protection, migration policy and the fight against organized crime. According to the Article 5 of Belavezha Accords, the High Contracting Parties shall recognize and respect each other's territorial integrity and the inviolability of existing borders within the Commonwealth. They shall guarantee the openness of borders, freedom of movement of citizens and freedom of information within the Commonwealth.

The former Soviet republics that became independent states were part of the economy of the Soviet Union with its common technical standards, common infrastructure, territorial proximity, chains of cooperation, and common legal heritage. Through the signing of international agreements on trade, economic cooperation and integration, countries can achieve an increase in the efficiency of their economies, which suffered due to the disintegration of the Soviet Union. At the same time, all post-Soviet countries have moved to a market economy, implemented reforms and expanded trade and cooperation with the global economy. Over the past three decades, several negotiations have taken place on proposed integration projects.

=== Treaty on the creation of an Economic Union ===
On 24 September 1993, at a meeting of the Commonwealth of Independent States (CIS) Council of Heads of State in Moscow, Azerbaijan, Armenia, Belarus, Kazakhstan, Kyrgyzstan, Moldova, Russia, Tajikistan, Uzbekistan signed the Treaty on the creation of an Economic Union which reinforces by an international agreement the intention to create an economic union through the step-by-step creation of a free trade area, a customs union and conditions for the free movement of goods, services, capital and labor. All these countries have ratified the Treaty and it entered into force on January 14, 1994. Turkmenistan and Georgia joined in 1994 and ratified the Treaty, but Georgia withdrew in 2009. A number of other documents and agreements were adopted for the development of the economic union. For example, on 21 October 1994, an Agreement on the creation of a Payment Union of States was signed and the Main directions of integration development and a perspective plan for integration development were adopted. The purpose of the union is to form common economic space grounded on free movement of goods, services, labour force, capital; to elaborate coordinated monetary, tax, price, customs, external economic policy; to bring together methods of regulating economic activity and create favourable conditions for the development of direct production relations. On 15 April 1994, the "Agreement on Ukraine's accession to the Economic Union as an associate member" was signed by Azerbaijan, Armenia, Belarus, Kazakhstan, Kyrgyzstan, Moldova, Russia, Tajikistan, Turkmenistan, Uzbekistan, Ukraine and Georgia but never entered into force due to non-ratification by Russia, Ukraine, Turkmenistan and Georgia, although all the others ratified.

As a permanent functioning coordinating and executive body of the Economic Union, the Interstate Economic Committee has been established.

=== Agreement on the Establishment of a Free Trade Area ===
On 15 April 1994, at a meeting of the Commonwealth of Independent States (CIS) Council of Heads of State in Moscow, all 12 post-Soviet states signed the international Agreement on the Establishment of a Free Trade Area in order to move towards the creation of an economic union. Article 17 also confirmed the intention to conclude a free trade agreement in services. Article 1 indicated that this was "the first stage of the creation of the Economic Union", but in 1999 the countries agreed to remove this phrase from the agreement.

On 29 March 1994, President of Kazakhstan Nursultan Nazarbayev complained that the CIS was inadequate and did not provide the integration that the countries badly needed. He proposed the creation of a Eurasian Union of States as a new organization completely separate from the CIS. The Eurasian Union of States was proposed as a combination of the economic union and political union. For the first time it was suggested to use the name "Eurasian" for an economic union rather than "Euro-Asian" or "Euroasian". The Eurasian Economic Union traces its history back to Nazarbayev's proposal.

== Bilateral Customs Union between Russia and Belarus ==
In order to implement the Treaty on the Creation of the Economic Union, on 6 January 1995 Russia and Belarus concluded an Agreement on a bilateral Customs Union. The Parties stated that certain results have been achieved within the framework of the Agreement between the Government of the Russian Federation and the Government of the Republic of Belarus on the Unified Procedure for Regulation of Foreign Economic Activities signed on 12 April 1994 in Moscow.

On 26 May 1995, Belarusian President Alexander Lukashenko and Russian Prime Minister Viktor Chernomyrdin dismantled the border post at the Belarus-Russia border. After that, customs and border controls were abolished. The Customs Union between Russia and Belarus entered into force on 30 November 1995.

According to the Eurasian Economic Union website, the agreement entered into force on 30 November 1995 for Belarus and Russia, entered into force on 3 December 1997 for Kazakhstan, and on 27 June 2002 for Tajikistan.

== Accession of Kazakhstan ==
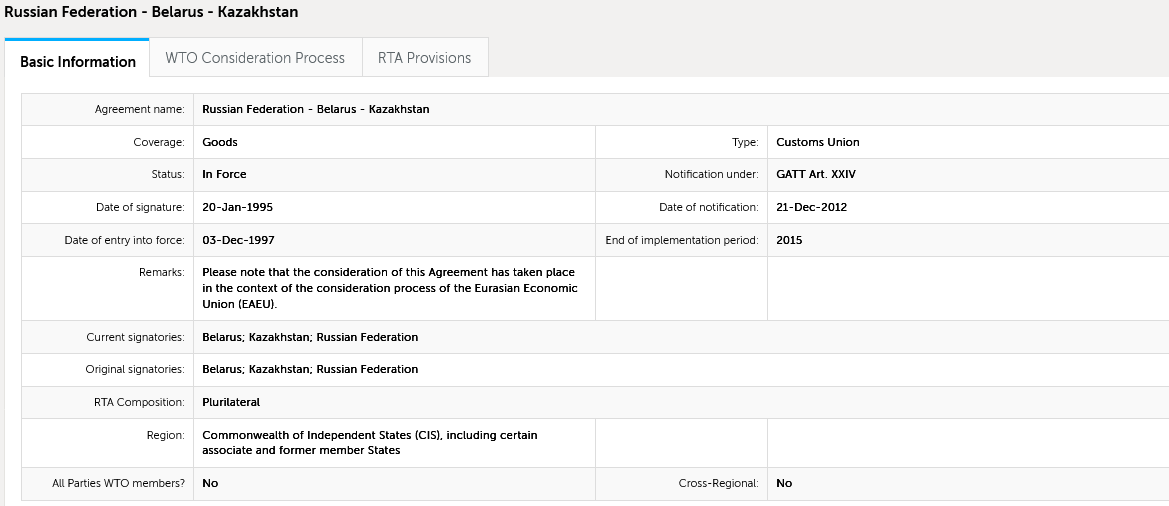
Regional Trade Agreements Database of the World Trade Organization.

Kazakhstan signed the accession on 20 January 1995 and the agreement entered into force for Kazakhstan on 3 December 1997.

According to the website of the Eurasian Economic Union, the agreement entered into force on 3 December 1997 for Kazakhstan, Belarus and Russia, and on 27 June 2002 for Tajikistan.

== Customs Union of the Eurasian Economic Community ==
The Eurasian Economic Community, founded in 2000, has assumed responsibility for the implementation of previous agreements, created supranational bodies and finally launched the long-delayed customs union in 2010.

The Customs Union of Russia, Belarus and Kazakhstan initially became effective on January 1, 2010 at the date of implementation of the common external tariff (CET) as the Customs Union of the Eurasian Economic Community.

The launch date in 2010 of the Customs Union was set in 2007 as a result of a decision on common customs territory, CET and the formation of the customs union. Its founding states were Belarus, Kazakhstan, and Russia.

== See also ==
- Regional organizations in the Post-Soviet states
- Union State of Russia and Belarus
- Eurasian economic integration
- European integration
- Czech-Slovak Customs Union
