= Visa requirements for Belarusian citizens =

Administrative entry restrictions

Belarusian passport

Visa requirements for Belarusian citizens are administrative entry restrictions imposed on citizens of Belarus by the authorities of other states.

Belarusian citizens in other countries can also benefit from the mobility rights arrangements within the Commonwealth of Independent States and the rules of the single market of the Eurasian Economic Union.

As of 2026, Belarusian citizens had visa-free or visa-on-arrival access to 77 countries and territories, ranking the Belarusian passport 61st in the world according to the Henley Passport Index.

== History ==
Visa requirements for Belarusian citizens were lifted (unilaterally or bilaterally, for the first time or repeatedly (in which case, the date of the last cancellation of visas is given) by Cuba (10 March 1999), Turkey (29 April 2013), Serbia (10 August 2013), Brazil (25 November 2016), Argentina (19 May 2017), China (10 August 2018), Saint Kitts and Nevis (23 June 2019), Montenegro (5 August 2019-31 October 2026), Albania (15 July 2020), United Arab Emirates (16 January 2021), Libya (26 May 2025) and Colombia (19 December 2025).

== Visa requirements map ==
Visa requirements for Belarusian citizens holding ordinary passports Belarus Freedom of movement Visa not required Visa not required (conditional) Visa on arrival eVisa Visa available both on arrival or online Visa required

== Visa requirements ==
Country	Visa requirement	Allowed stay	Notes (excluding departure fees)
Afghanistan	eVisa	30 days	e-Visa : Visitors must arrive at Kabul International (KBL).
Albania	eVisa	90 days	Visitors can enter with a multiple entry C or D visas issued by a Schengen Member State, if they used the visa to enter the Schengen Area at least once, or multiple entry visa issued by the United Kingdom or the USA if they have already used the visa to enter the country of issue at least once for a maximum of 90 days.; Visitors can obtain an e-visa before departure at https://e-visa.al. They must have a printed e-visa confirmation which can be verified by the SQsign App by scanning its QR code.
Algeria	Visa required		Persons may be denied entry if entering with a passport containing visas or stamps issued by Israel.; Visitors on tours organized to some southern regions by an approved travel agency may obtain a visa on arrival for up to 30 days.
Andorra	Visa required		Although no visa requirements exist, apply the relevant regulations of France or Spain, whichever must be transited to reach Andorra.
Angola	eVisa	30 days	
Antigua and Barbuda	Visa not required	6 months	
Argentina	Visa not required	90 days	90 days within any 1 calendar year.
Armenia	Visa not required	180 days	180 days in a year.
Australia	Visa required		May apply online (Online Visitor e600 visa).
Austria	Visa required		
Azerbaijan	Visa not required	90 days	Who are of Armenian descent Government of Azerbaijan bans the entry.
Bahamas	eVisa	3 months	US$100 for a single-entry visa or US$110 for multiply entry.
Bahrain	eVisa	14 days	Those with a visa issued by USA, United Kingdom, a Schengen Member State, Saudi Arabia or United Arab Emirates can obtain a visa on arrival for a maximum stay of 1 month. They can apply to extend their stay for an additional 2 weeks.
Bangladesh	Visa on arrival	30 days	
Barbados	Visa not required	28 days	
Belgium	Visa required		
Belize	Visa required		No visa required for holders of a valid multiple entry visa or Permanent Residence Card from the US, multiple entry Schengen visa, multiple entry visa or Permanent Residence Card from Canada.
Benin	eVisa	30 days	Must have an international vaccination certificate.; Three types of electronic visa are offered: the e-Visa valid for 30 days for a single entry (50 EUR), the e-Visa valid for 30 days for several (multiple) entries (75 EUR), and the e-Visa valid for 90 days to make several (multiple) entries (100 EUR).
Bhutan	eVisa	90 days	The Sustainable Development Fee (SDF) of 200 USD per person, per night for almost all visitors to Bhutan. Additionally, if payment is made in US dollars from September 1, 2023 to August 31, 2027, the SDF is 100 USD.
Bolivia	Online Visa		
Bosnia and Herzegovina	Visa required		No visa required for holders of multiple-entry visa issued by Cyprus, Ireland, Monaco, USA or a Schengen Member State for a maximum stay of 30 days. A total of 90 days is granted within 6 months.
Botswana	eVisa	3 months	
Brazil	Visa not required	90 days	
Brunei	Visa required		
Bulgaria	Visa required		
Burkina Faso	eVisa		
Burundi	Online Visa / Visa on arrival	1 month	
Cambodia	eVisa / Visa on arrival	30 days	
Cameroon	eVisa		
Canada	Visa required		
Cape Verde	Visa required		
Central African Republic	Visa required		
Chad	Visa required		
Chile	Visa required		
China	Visa not required	30 days	Visa-free for 30 days, for a maximum total stay of 90 days within any 1 calendar year.
Colombia	Visa not required	90 days	
Comoros	Visa on arrival	45 days	Nationals of any country can obtain a visa on arrival for a maximum stay of 45 days.
Republic of the Congo	Visa required		
Democratic Republic of the Congo	eVisa	7 days	
Costa Rica	Visa required		
Côte d'Ivoire	eVisa	3 months	e-Visa holders must arrive via Port Bouet Airport.
Croatia	Visa required		
Cuba	Visa not required	30 days	
Cyprus	Visa required		
Czech Republic	Visa required		
Denmark	Visa required		
Djibouti	eVisa	90 days	
Dominica	Visa not required	21 days	
Dominican Republic	Visa required		
Ecuador	Visa not required	90 days	
Egypt	eVisa / Visa on arrival	1 month	Visa on arrival is available in any land, air or sea port of entry for 30 USD, or e-Visa is available.
El Salvador	Visa required		
Equatorial Guinea	eVisa		
Eritrea	Visa required		
Estonia	Visa required		
Eswatini	Visa required		
Ethiopia	eVisa / Visa on arrival	90 days	Visa on arrival is obtainable only at Addis Ababa Bole International Airport.; e-Visa holders must arrive via Addis Ababa Bole International Airport.; e-Visa is available for 30 or 90 days.
Fiji	eVisa		
Finland	Visa required		
France	Visa required		
Gabon	eVisa	90 days	e-Visa holders must arrive via Libreville International Airport.
Gambia	Visa required		
Georgia	Visa not required	1 year	
Germany	Visa required		
Ghana	Visa required		
Greece	Visa required		
Grenada	Visa on arrival		A pre-clearance letter issued by Grenada required for visa on arrival.
Guatemala	Visa required		Visa-free for a maximum stay of 90 days for holders of a valid visa issued by Canada, USA or a Schengen Member State.
Guinea	eVisa	90 days	
Guinea-Bissau	Visa on arrival	90 days	
Guyana	eVisa		
Haiti	Visa not required	3 months	
Honduras	Visa not required	90 days	
Hungary	Visa required		
Iceland	Visa required		
India	eVisa	30 days	e-Visa holders must arrive via 32 designated airports (Note: Ahmedabad; Amritsar; Bagdogra; Bengaluru; Bhubaneswar; Chandigarh; Chennai; Coimbatore; Delhi; Gaya; Goa-Dabolim; Goa-Manohar; Guwahati; Hyderabad; Indore; Jaipur; Kannur; Kochi; Kolkata; Kozhikode; Lucknow; Madurai; Mangaluru; Mumbai; Nagpur; Port Blair; Pune; Surat; Thiruvananthapuram; Tiruchirappalli; Varanasi; Visakhapatnam) or 5 designated seaports. (Note: Chennai; Cochin; Mormugao; Mumbai; Mangalore); An Indian e-Tourist Visa may only be obtained twice within 1 calendar year.; Foreigners of Pakistani origin or who hold a Pakistani Passport are not eligible for an e-Visa. Foreigners who are not Pakistani nationals, but whose parents or grandparents (either paternal or maternal) were born in, or were permanent residents in Pakistan, are also not eligible for an e-Visa.
Indonesia	Visa not required	30 days	
Iran	Visa not required	15 days	
Iraq	eVisa	30 days	
Ireland	Visa required		Visa waiver for UK 'C' visa holders until October 2026.; Entry permitted only if first point of entry to the Common Travel Area is in the UK.
Israel	Electronic Travel Authorization	90 days	
Italy	Visa required		
Jamaica	Visa on arrival	30 days	Visa waived for holders of a visa issued by Canada, USA, United Kingdom or a Schengen Member State, valid for the period of intended stay. They must travel as tourists for a maximum stay of 30 days. They must also have a vaccination certificate for Measles, Polio and Rubella.
Japan	Visa required		
Jordan	eVisa / Visa on arrival		Visa can be obtained upon arrival, it will cost a total of 40 JOD, obtainable at most international ports of entry and land border crossings. (except King Hussein/Allenby Bridge)
Kazakhstan	Visa not required	90 days	90 days within any 180 day period.
Kenya	Electronic Travel Authorization	90 days	Applications can be submitted up to 90 days prior to travel and must be submitted at least 3 days in advance.; eTA fee is 32.50 USD.; Proof of reservation at the hotel where visitors plan to stay is required (if staying with friends, an invitation letter is also acceptable).; Yellow fever vaccination certificate is required if coming from endemic countries.; Can also be entered on an East Africa tourist visa issued by Rwanda or Uganda.
Kiribati	Visa required		
North Korea	Visa required		
South Korea	Visa required		Visa-free access for 30 days to Jeju Island.
Kuwait	Visa required		
Kyrgyzstan	Visa not required	Unlimited	
Laos	Visa not required	30 days	
Latvia	Visa required		
Lebanon	Free Visa on arrival	1 month	Extendable for 2 additional months.; Granted free of charge at Beirut International Airport or any other port of entry if there is no Israeli visa or seal, holding a telephone number, an address in Lebanon, and a non refundable return or circle trip ticket.
Lesotho	Visa required		
Liberia	e-VOA	3 months	
Libya	eVisa	30 days	
Liechtenstein	Visa required		
Lithuania	Visa required		
Luxembourg	Visa required		
Madagascar	eVisa/Visa on arrival	90 days	For stays of 61 to 90 days, the visa fee is 59 USD.
Malawi	eVisa / Visa on arrival	30 days	
Malaysia	Visa not required	30 days	
Maldives	Free visa on arrival	30 days	
Mali	Visa required		
Malta	Visa required		
Marshall Islands	Visa required		
Mauritania	eVisa	30 days	Visitors can obtain an e-Visa before departure at https://anrpts.gov.mr/visa/requestvisa. They must have a printed e-visa confirmation.
Mauritius	Visa on arrival	60 days	
Mexico	Visa required		Passengers can enter with a multiple-entry visa issued by Canada, Japan, United Kingdom, USA or a Schengen Member State for a maximum of 180 days. An extended visa issued by the USA is not accepted.
Micronesia	Visa not required	30 days	
Moldova	Visa not required	90 days	90 days within any 180 day period.
Monaco	Visa required		
Mongolia	Visa not required	90 days	
Montenegro	Visa required		Visa required from November 1, 2026.
Morocco	Visa required		e-Visa is available for holders of residence permit or non-electronic visas of Schengen countries, the United States, Australia, Canada, the United Kingdom, Ireland, and New Zealand, with multiple entries and that are valid for at least 90 days as of the date of submission of the e-Visa application.
Mozambique	eVisa / Visa on arrival	30 days	
Myanmar	Visa not required	30 days	
Namibia	eVisa / Visa on arrival	90 days/ 3 months	
Nauru	Visa required		Visa applications are made by emailing the Nauru Immigration with necessary details. Visa cost is 50 USD.
Nepal	eVisa / Visa on arrival	90 days	15 Days - 30 USD?, 30 Days - 50 USD, 90 Days - 125 USD.
Netherlands	Visa required		
New Zealand	Visa required		
Nicaragua	Visa not required	90 days	
Niger	Visa required		
Nigeria	eVisa	30 days	
North Macedonia	Visa required		Visa not required for whose with a multiple entry visa issued by Canada, USA or United Kingdom or a multiple entry Schengen C visa. The visa must be valid for at least 5 days beyond the period of intended stay. They are visa exempt for a maximum stay of 15 days. A total of 90 days is granted within 6 months.
Norway	Visa required		
Oman	Visa not required	14 days	
Pakistan	eVisa	3 months	
Palau	Free visa on arrival	30 days	
Panama	Visa not required	90 days	
Papua New Guinea	eVisa	60 days	Visitors may apply for a visa online under the "Tourist - Own Itinerary" category.
Paraguay	Visa required		
Peru	Visa not required	90 days	
Philippines	eVisa		Passengers can obtain an e-visa before departure at https://evisa.gov.ph. This only applies to residents of the United Arab Emirates who hold valid Emirati residence visas.
Poland	Visa required		
Portugal	Visa required		
Qatar	eVisa / Visa on arrival	30 days	Visitors travelling as tourists or on business can obtain a visa upon arrival for a maximum of 30 days. They must have a return ticket; and at least 1,000 USD - cash or a valid credit card; and a hotel reservation confirmation for the duration of stay in Qatar.
Romania	Visa required		
Russia	Visa not required	Freedom of movement.	
Rwanda	eVisa / Visa on arrival	30 days	
Saint Kitts and Nevis	Electronic Travel Authorisation	30 days	
Saint Lucia	Visa required		Cruise ship passengers visiting for one day are exempted from obtaining visas.
Saint Vincent and the Grenadines	Visa not required	3 months	
Samoa	Entry permit on arrival	90 days	
San Marino	Visa required		
São Tomé and Príncipe	eVisa		
Saudi Arabia	eVisa		Passengers with a tourist or business visa issued by the US, United Kingdom or a Schengen Member State can obtain a visa upon arrival for a maximum of 90 days in a period of 12 months if they travel as tourists. The visa must have been used at least once and must have an entry stamp of the issuing country. The visa fee must be paid by credit card.
Senegal	Visa required		
Serbia	Visa not required	30 days	
Seychelles	Electronic Border System	3 months	Passengers can obtain a "Visitor's Permit" upon arrival for a maximum of 3 months. They must have: a return/onward ticket; and - sufficient funds (minimum of US$150.- or equivalent per day); and - proof of accommodation for the duration of stay. Extension of stay possible for additional 3 months with a maximum stay of 12 months.
Sierra Leone	eVisa	3 months	
Singapore	Visa required		Visa-free for 96 hours in case of transit to/from 3rd countries.; Visa application can be submitted online using the 'e-Service' through a strategic partner or a local contact in Singapore.
Slovakia	Visa required		
Slovenia	Visa required		
Solomon Islands	Visa required		
Somalia	eVisa	30 days	
South Africa	eVisa		
South Sudan	eVisa		Obtainable online 30 days single entry for 100 USD, 90 days multiple entry for 200 USD and 180 days multiple entry for 350 USD.; Printed visa authorization must be presented at the time of travel.
Spain	Visa required		
Sri Lanka	ETA / Visa on arrival	30 days	
Sudan	Visa required		
Suriname	Visa not required	90 days	An entrance fee of USD 50 or EUR 50 must be paid online prior to arrival.; Multiple entry e-Visa is also available.
Sweden	Visa required		
Switzerland	Visa required		
Syria	eVisa / Visa on arrival		Visa on arrival for a maximum stay of 15 days.
Tajikistan	Visa not required	Unlimited	
Tanzania	eVisa / Visa on arrival	90 days	
Thailand	Visa on arrival	15 days	
Timor-Leste	Visa on arrival	30 days	
Togo	eVisa	15 days	Visitors can obtain an e-visa before departure at https://voyage.gouv.tg. They must have a printed e-visa confirmation with a QR code..
Tonga	Visa required		
Trinidad and Tobago	eVisa	90 days	
Tunisia	Visa not required	90 days	
Turkey	Visa not required	30 days	For a maximum total stay of 90 days within 1 year.
Turkmenistan	Visa required		10-day visa on arrival if holding a letter of invitation provided by a company registered in Turkmenistan with a prior approval from the Foreign Ministry. Visitors can apply to extend their stay for an additional 10 days.; When transiting between two non-bordering countries, visitors can obtain a Turkmenistan transit visa for a five-day stay. This must be applied for in advance at the Turkmenistan Embassy. Visitors must also submit copies of the visas for the country of entry into Turkmenistan and the country of departure from Turkmenistan. Visa fee is 20 USD.
Tuvalu	Visa on arrival	1 month	
Uganda	eVisa	3 months	
Ukraine	Visa not required	90 days	90 days within any 180-day period. Entering Ukraine for Belarusian citizens is only allowed for women and male citizens under the age of 18 or older than 60.
United Arab Emirates	Visa not required	90 days	90 days within any 180-day period.
United Kingdom	Visa required		
United States	Visa required		
Uruguay	Visa required		
Uzbekistan	Visa not required	Unlimited	
Vanuatu	Visa not required	120 days	
Vatican City	Visa required		
Venezuela	Visa not required	90 days	Extension of stay possible for additional 90 days.
Vietnam	Visa not required	45 days	The total period of stay must not exceed 90 days within a calendar year.; A single entry e-Visa valid for 90 days is also available.
Yemen	Visa required		Yemen introduced an e-Visa system for visitors who meet certain eligibility requirements (group travel of 10 or more people, business trips, and transit etc.).
Zambia	eVisa / Visa on arrival	90 days	
Zimbabwe	eVisa / Visa on arrival	1 month	

== Territories and disputed areas ==
Visa requirements for Belarusian citizens for visits to various territories, disputed areas and restricted zones:

Visitor to	Visa requirement	Notes (excluding departure fees)
Europe
Abkhazia	Visa not required	14 days
Mount Athos	Special permit required	Special permit required (4 days: 25 euro for Orthodox visitors, 35 euro for non-Orthodox visitors, 18 euro for students). There is a visitors' quota: maximum 100 Orthodox and 10 non-Orthodox per day and women are not allowed.
Turkish Republic of Northern Cyprus	Visa not required	90 days
(United Nations) UN Buffer Zone in Cyprus	Visa required	Access Permit is required for travelling inside the zone, except Civil Use Areas.
Gibraltar	Visa required	
(Norway) Jan Mayen	Permit required	Permit issued by the local police required for staying for less than 24 hours and permit issued by the Norwegian police for staying for more than 24 hours.
Kosovo	Visa required	No visa required for holders of a multiple entry Schengen visa valid for the duration of stay. They can stay for a maximum of 15 days.
South Ossetia	Visa required	To enter South Ossetia, visitors must have a multiple-entry visa for Russia and register their stay with the Migration Service of the Ministry of Internal Affairs within 3 days.
(Norway) Svalbard	Visa not required	
Transnistria	Visa not required	Registration required after 24h.
Africa
British Indian Ocean Territory	Special permit required	Special permit required.
Eritrea (outside Asmara)	Travel permit required	To travel in the rest of the country, a Travel Permit for Foreigners is required (20 Eritrean nakfa)
Ascension Island	Admission refused	From May 2015, the Ascension Island Government does not issue entry visas including eVisas to nationals of Belarus.
Saint Helena	eVisa	
Tristan da Cunha	Permission required	Permission to land required for 15/30 pounds sterling (yacht/ship passenger) for Tristan da Cunha Island or 20 pounds sterling for Gough Island, Inaccessible Island or Nightingale Islands.
Sahrawi Arab Democratic Republic (Western Sahara controlled territory)	Unknown	
Somaliland	Visa required	
Asia
Hong Kong	Visa not required	30 days
India	PAP/RAP required	Protected Area Permit (PAP) required for all of Arunachal Pradesh, Manipur, Mizoram and parts of Himachal Pradesh, Jammu and Kashmir and Uttarakhand. Restricted Area Permit (RAP) required for all of Andaman and Nicobar Islands and Lakshadweep and parts of Sikkim. Some of these requirements are occasionally lifted for a year.
(Iran) Kish Island	Visa not required	14 days; Visitors to Kish Island do not require a visa.
Iraqi Kurdistan	Visa required	If the guarantor applies and pays, the visitors may apply for an e-Visa. e-Visa for 30 days is available at Erbil and Sulaymaniyah airports.
Macau	Visa not required	30 days
Palestine	Visa not required	Arrival by sea to Gaza Strip not allowed.
Taiwan	Visa required	
(Tajikistan) Gorno-Badakhshan Autonomous Province	OIVR permit required	OIVR permit required (15+5 Tajikistani Somoni) and another special permit (free of charge) is required for Lake Sarez.
(China) Tibet Autonomous Region	TTP required	Tibet Travel Permit required (10 USD).
(United Nations) Korean Demilitarized Zone	Restricted zone.	
(United Nations) UNDOF Zone and Ghajar	Restricted zone.	
Caribbean and North Atlantic
Anguilla	eVisa	
Aruba	Visa required	
Bermuda	Visa required	
(Netherlands) Bonaire, St. Eustatius and Saba	Visa required	
British Virgin Islands	Visa required	
Cayman Islands	Visa required	
Curacao	Visa required	
(France) French Guiana	Visa required	
(France) French West Indies	Visa required	
Montserrat	Visa required	
Puerto Rico	Visa required	
Sint Maarten	Visa required	
Turks and Caicos Islands	Visa required	
U.S. Virgin Islands	Visa required	
Oceania
American Samoa	Visa required	
(Australia) Ashmore and Cartier Islands	Special authorisation required	Special authorisation required.
(France) Clipperton Island	Visa required	Special permit required.
Cook Islands	Visa not required	31 days
French Polynesia	Visa required	
Guam	Visa required	
Niue	Visa not required	30 days
Pitcairn Islands	Visa not required	14 days visa-free and landing fee 35 USD or tax of 5 USD if not going ashore.
Tokelau	Entry permit required	
United States Minor Outlying Islands	Special permits required	Special permits required for Baker Island, Howland Island, Jarvis Island, Johnston Atoll, Kingman Reef, Midway Atoll, Palmyra Atoll and Wake Island.
South America
Galápagos	Pre-registration required	60 days; Visitors must pre-register to receive a 20 USD Transit Control Card (TCT).
South Atlantic and Antarctica
Falkland Islands	Visa required	
South Georgia and the South Sandwich Islands	Permit required	Pre-arrival permit from the Commissioner required (72 hours/1 month for 110/160 pounds sterling).
Antarctica	Special Permits Required	Special permits required for British Antarctic Territory, French Southern and Antarctic Lands, Argentine Antarctica, (Australia) Australian Antarctic Territory, (Antártica Chilena Province) Chilean Antarctic Territory, (Australia) Heard Island and McDonald Islands, (Norway) Peter I Island, (Norway) Queen Maud Land, (New Zealand) Ross Dependency.

== Economic integration and international treaties ==
Special travel conditions and exceptions to the usual rules, including special migration rules for Belarusian citizens, their family members and conditions for the provision of medical care are provided through international agreements and treaties to Belarusian citizens. The conditions for citizens in a specific country should be clarified in advance because not all countries are parties to all agreements.

- Union State of Russia and Belarus (Russia)
- The rules of the Single Economic Space of the Eurasian Economic Union (Armenia, Russia, Kazakhstan, Kyrgyzstan)
- Mobility rights arrangements of the Commonwealth of Independent States (present and former countries of the Commonwealth of Independent States, including de jure Ukraine and Georgia, but not Turkmenistan)

== Permission stamps ==
Until 1 January 2008, Belarusian citizens had to apply for permission stamps in their passports in order to cross Belarusian borders. Permission stamps were only issued if there were no specific legal restrictions for their travel.

In 2002, the Constitutional Court of Belarus stated in its decision that permission stamps were not constitutional. The Council of Ministers was ordered to propose a different kind of a citizen border control before 1 January 2006.

The decree of the President of the Republic of Belarus dated 17 December 2007 finally abolished permission stamps.

== Non-visa restrictions ==
=== Blank passport pages ===
Many countries require a minimum number of blank pages to be available in the passport being presented, typically one or two pages. Endorsement pages, which often appear after the visa pages, are not counted as being valid or available.

=== Vaccination ===
Cover of the new International Certificate of Vaccination issued by the Bureau of Quarantine in the Philippines since 2021

The African countries of Angola, Benin, Burkina Faso, Burundi, Cameroon, Central African Republic, Democratic Republic of the Congo, Republic of the Congo, Côte d'Ivoire, Gabon, Ghana, Guinea-Bissau, Mali, Niger, Sierra Leone and Togo, South Sudan and Uganda, along with French Guiana in South America, require all incoming passengers older than nine months to one year, to have a current International Certificate of Vaccination or Prophylaxis.

Some other countries require vaccination only if the passenger is coming from an infected area or has visited one recently or has transited for 12 hours in those countries: Algeria, Botswana, Cabo Verde, Chad, Djibouti, Egypt, Eswatini, Ethiopia, Gambia, Ghana, Guinea, Lesotho, Libya, Equatorial Guinea, Eritrea, Madagascar, Malawi, Mauritania, Mauritius, Mozambique, Namibia, Nigeria, Papua New Guinea, Seychelles, Somalia, South Africa, Sudan, Tunisia, Uganda, Tanzania, Zambia and Zimbabwe.

=== Passport validity length ===
Very few countries, such as Paraguay, just require a valid passport on arrival.

However many countries and groupings now require only an identity card – especially from their neighbours. Other countries may have special bilateral arrangements that depart from the generality of their passport validity length policies to shorten the period of passport validity required for each other's citizens or even accept passports that have already expired (but not been cancelled).

Some countries, such as Japan, Ireland and the United Kingdom, require a passport valid throughout the period of the intended stay.

In the absence of specific bilateral agreements, countries requiring passports to be valid for at least 6 more months on arrival include Afghanistan, Algeria, Anguilla, Bahrain, Bhutan, Botswana, British Virgin Islands, Brunei, Cambodia, Cameroon, Cape Verde, Cayman Islands, Central African Republic, Chad, Comoros, Costa Rica, Côte d'Ivoire, Curaçao, Ecuador, Egypt, El Salvador, Equatorial Guinea, Fiji, Gabon, Guinea Bissau, Guyana, Haiti, India, Indonesia, Iran, Iraq, Israel, Jordan, Kenya, Kiribati, Kuwait, Laos, Madagascar, Malaysia, Marshall Islands, Mongolia, Myanmar, Namibia, Nepal, Nicaragua, Nigeria, Oman, Palau, Papua New Guinea, Peru, Philippines, Qatar, Rwanda, Samoa, Saudi Arabia, Singapore, Solomon Islands, Somalia, Sri Lanka, Sudan, Suriname, Tanzania, Thailand, Timor-Leste, Tokelau, Tonga, Turkey, Tuvalu, Uganda, United Arab Emirates, Vanuatu, Venezuela, and Vietnam.

Countries requiring passports valid for at least 4 months on arrival include Micronesia and Zambia.

Countries requiring passports with a validity of at least 3 months beyond the date of intended departure include Azerbaijan, Bosnia and Herzegovina, Honduras, Montenegro, Nauru, Moldova and New Zealand. Similarly, the EEA countries of Iceland, Liechtenstein, Norway, all European Union countries (except Ireland) together with Switzerland also require 3 months validity beyond the date of the bearer's intended departure unless the bearer is an EEA or Swiss national.

Countries requiring passports valid for at least 3 months on arrival include Albania, North Macedonia, Panama, and Senegal.

Bermuda requires passports to be valid for at least 45 days upon entry.

Countries that require a passport validity of at least one month beyond the date of intended departure include Eritrea, Hong Kong, Lebanon, Macau, the Maldives and South Africa.

==== Maximum passport age ====
Countries of the Schengen area require non-EU passports to be less than 10 years old upon entry.

=== Criminal record ===
Some countries, including Australia, Canada, Fiji, New Zealand and the United States, routinely deny entry to non-citizens who have a criminal record, while others impose restrictions depending on the type of conviction and the length of the sentence.

=== Persona non grata ===
The government of a country can declare a diplomat persona non grata, banning them from entering the country or expelling them if they have already entered. In non-diplomatic use, the authorities of a country may also declare a foreigner persona non grata permanently or temporarily, usually because of unlawful activity.

=== Israeli stamps ===
Kuwait, Lebanon, Libya, and Yemen do not allow entry to people with passport stamps from Israel or whose passports have either a used or an unused Israeli visa, or where there is evidence of previous travel to Israel such as entry or exit stamps from neighbouring border posts in transit countries such as Jordan and Egypt.

To circumvent this Arab League boycott of Israel, the Israeli immigration services have now mostly ceased to stamp foreign nationals' passports on either entry to or exit from Israel (unless the entry is for some work-related purposes). Since 15 January 2013, Israel no longer stamps foreign passports at Ben Gurion Airport. Passports are still (as of 22 June 2017) stamped at Erez when passing into and out of Gaza.

Iran refuses admission to holders of passports containing an Israeli visa or stamp that is less than 12 months old.

=== Biometrics ===
Several countries mandate that all travellers, or all foreign travellers, be fingerprinted on arrival and will refuse admission to or even arrest travellers who refuse to comply. In some countries, such as the United States, this may apply even to transit passengers who merely wish to change planes rather than go landside.

Fingerprinting countries/regions include Afghanistan, Argentina, Brunei, Cambodia, China, Ethiopia, Ghana, Guinea, India, Japan, Kenya (both fingerprints and a photo are taken), Malaysia upon entry and departure, Mongolia, Saudi Arabia, the Schengen Area, Singapore, South Korea, Taiwan, Thailand, Uganda, the United Arab Emirates and the United States.

Many countries also require a photo be taken of people entering the country. The United States, which does not fully implement exit control formalities at its land frontiers (although long mandated by its own legislation), intends to implement facial recognition for passengers departing from international airports to identify people who overstay their visa.

Together with fingerprint and face recognition, iris scanning is one of three biometric identification technologies internationally standardised since 2006 by the International Civil Aviation Organization (ICAO) for use in e-passports and the United Arab Emirates conducts iris scanning on visitors who need to apply for a visa. The United States Department of Homeland Security has announced plans to greatly increase the biometric data it collects at US borders. In 2018, Singapore began trials of iris scanning at three land and maritime immigration checkpoints.

== See also ==
- Visa policy of Belarus
- Belarusian passport
