= Krasnaya Gorka, Bizhbulyaksky District, Republic of Bashkortostan =

Krasnaya Gorka Красная Горка
- Village
- Location within Bashkortostan Location within Russia
- Coordinates: 53°41′N 54°01′E
- Country: Russia
- Region: Bashkortostan
- District: Bizhbulyaksky District
- Time zone: UTC+5:00

Krasnaya Gorka (Russian: Красная Горка) is a rural locality (a village) in Ziriklinsky Selsoviet, Bizhbulyaksky District, Bashkortostan, Russia. The population was 2 as of 2010. There are 2 streets.

== Geography ==
Krasnaya Gorka is located 26 km west of Bizhbulyak (the district's administrative centre) by road. Lysogorka is the nearest rural locality.
