= Krasnaya Gorka, Yuryev-Polsky District, Vladimir Oblast =

Krasnaya Gorka Красная Горка
- Selo
- Location within Vladimir Oblast Location within Russia
- Coordinates: 56°28′N 39°52′E
- Country: Russia
- Region: Vladimir Oblast
- District: Yuryev-Polsky District
- Time zone: UTC+3:00

Krasnaya Gorka (Russian: Красная Горка) is a rural locality (a selo) in Nebylovskoye Rural Settlement, Yuryev-Polsky District, Vladimir Oblast, Russia. The population was 105 as of 2010.

== Geography ==
Krasnaya Gorka is located 15 km east of Yuryev-Polsky (the district's administrative centre) by road. Ryabinki is the nearest rural locality.
