= Krasnaya Gorka, Arkhangelsky District, Republic of Bashkortostan =

Krasnaya Gorka Красная Горка
- Village
- Location within Bashkortostan Location within Russia
- Coordinates: 54°21′N 56°46′E
- Country: Russia
- Region: Bashkortostan
- District: Arkhangelsky District
- Time zone: UTC+5:00

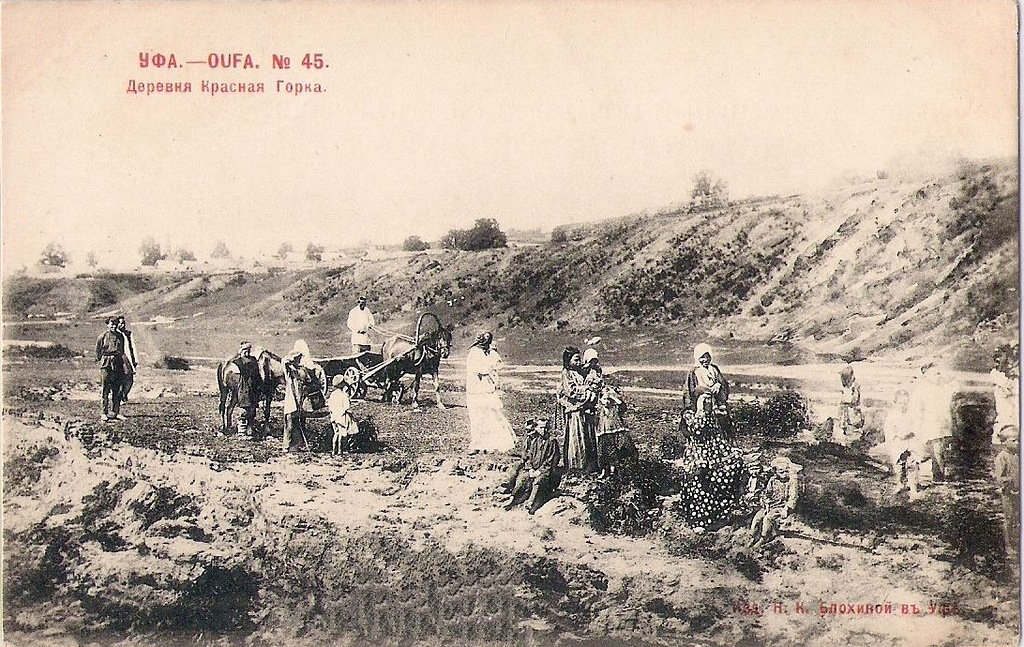
Pre-revolutionary postcards with views of the city

Krasnaya Gorka (Russian: Красная Горка) is a rural locality (a village) in Krasnozilimsky Selsoviet, Arkhangelsky District, Bashkortostan, Russia. The population was 2 as of 2010. There is 1 street.

== Geography ==
Krasnaya Gorka is located 8 km south of Arkhangelskoye (the district's administrative centre) by road. Pobeda is the nearest rural locality.
