= Krasnaya Gorka, Amur Oblast =

Krasnaya Gorka Красная Горка
- Village
- Location within Amur Oblast Location within Russia
- Coordinates: 49°30′N 129°57′E
- Country: Russia
- Region: Amur Oblast
- District: Arkharinsky District
- Time zone: UTC+9:00

Krasnaya Gorka (Russian: Красная Горка) is a rural locality (a selo) in Antonovsky Selsoviet of Arkharinsky District, Amur Oblast, Russia. The population was 4 in 2018. There are 2 streets.

== Geography ==
Krasnaya Gorka is located 19 km northwest of Arkhara (the district's administrative centre) by road. Zhuravli is the nearest rural locality.
