= Krasnaya Gorka, Bakalinsky District, Republic of Bashkortostan =

Krasnaya Gorka Красная Горка
- Selo
- Location within Bashkortostan Location within Russia
- Coordinates: 55°16′N 54°03′E
- Country: Russia
- Region: Bashkortostan
- District: Bakalinsky District
- Time zone: UTC+5:00

Krasnaya Gorka (Russian: Красная Горка) is a rural locality (a selo) in Staromatinsky Selsoviet, Bakalinsky District, Bashkortostan, Russia. The population was 28 as of 2010. There is 1 street.

== Geography ==
Krasnaya Gorka is located 22 km northeast of Bakaly (the district's administrative centre) by road. Vorsinka is the nearest rural locality.
