= Krasnaya Gorka, Chagodoshchensky District, Vologda Oblast =

Krasnaya Gorka Красная Горка
- Village
- Location within Vologda Oblast Location within Russia
- Coordinates: 58°53′N 35°19′E
- Country: Russia
- Region: Vologda Oblast
- District: Chagodoshchensky District
- Time zone: UTC+3:00

Krasnaya Gorka (Russian: Красная Горка) is a rural locality (a village) in Lukinskoye Rural Settlement, Chagodoshchensky District, Vologda Oblast, Russia. The population was 6 as of 2002.

== Geography ==
Krasnaya Gorka is located 42 km (26 mi) south of Chagoda (the district's administrative centre) by road. Anishino is the nearest rural locality.
