= Krasnaya Gorka, Pinezhsky District, Arkhangelsk Oblast =

Krasnaya Gorka Красная Горка
- Settlement
- Location within Arkhangelsk Oblast Location within Russia
- Coordinates: 64°35′N 43°17′E
- Country: Russia
- Region: Arkhangelsk Oblast
- District: Pinezhsky District
- Time zone: UTC+3:00

Krasnaya Gorka (Russian: Красная Горка) is a rural locality (a settlement) in Pinezhskoye Rural Settlement of Pinezhsky District, Arkhangelsk Oblast, Russia. The population was 30 as of 2010.

== Geography ==
Krasnaya Gorka is located 149 km northwest of Karpogory (the district's administrative centre) by road. Maletino is the nearest rural locality.
