= Krasnaya Gorka, Sudogodsky District, Vladimir Oblast =

Krasnaya Gorka Красная Горка
- Village
- Location within Vladimir Oblast Location within Russia
- Coordinates: 55°59′N 40°43′E
- Country: Russia
- Region: Vladimir Oblast
- District: Sudogodsky District
- Time zone: UTC+3:00

Krasnaya Gorka (Russian: Красная Горка) is a rural locality (a village) in Golovinskoye Rural Settlement, Sudogodsky District, Vladimir Oblast, Russia. The population was 20 as of 2010. There are 5 streets.

== Geography ==
Krasnaya Gorka is located on the Reka Soyma River, 12 km northwest of Sudogda (the district's administrative centre) by road. Soyma is the nearest rural locality.
