= Krasnaya Gorka, Selivanovsky District, Vladimir Oblast =

Krasnaya Gorka Красная Горка
- Village
- Location within Vladimir Oblast Location within Russia
- Coordinates: 55°51′N 41°44′E
- Country: Russia
- Region: Vladimir Oblast
- District: Selivanovsky District
- Time zone: UTC+3:00

Krasnaya Gorka (Russian: Красная Горка) is a rural locality (a village) in Novlyanskoye Rural Settlement, Selivanovsky District, Vladimir Oblast, Russia. The population was 3 as of 2010.

== Geography ==
Krasnaya Gorka is located 3 km southwest of Krasnaya Gorbatka (the district's administrative centre) by road. Andreyevka is the nearest rural locality.
