= Selishche =

Selishche Селище
- Village
- Location within Vladimir Oblast Location within Russia
- Coordinates: 56°12′N 42°11′E
- Country: Russia
- Region: Vladimir Oblast
- District: Vyaznikovsky District
- Time zone: UTC+3:00

Selishche (Russian: Селище) is a rural locality (a village) in Gorod Vyazniki, Vyaznikovsky District, Vladimir Oblast, Russia. The population was 157 as of 2010.

== Geography ==
Selishche is located 10 km southeast of Vyazniki (the district's administrative centre) by road. Vyazniki is the nearest rural locality.
