= Kruglovka =

Kruglovka Кругловка
- Khutor
- Location within Volgograd Oblast Location within Russia
- Coordinates: 50°07′N 41°35′E
- Country: Russia
- Region: Volgograd Oblast
- District: Nekhayevsky District
- Time zone: UTC+4:00

Kruglovka (Russian: Кругловка) is a rural locality (a khutor) and the administrative center of Kruglovskoye Rural Settlement, Nekhayevsky District, Volgograd Oblast, Russia. The population was 938 as of 2010. There are 14 streets.

== Geography ==
Kruglovka is located on the Peskovatka River, 37 km southwest of Nekhayevskaya (the district's administrative centre) by road. Makhiny is the nearest rural locality.
