= Sidarenka =

Sidarenka is a surname of Belarusian origin. Notable people with the surname include:

- Alaksandr Sidarenka (born 1972), Belarusian wrestler
- Dzianis Sidarenka (1976-2024), Belarusian diplomat
- Kiryl Sidarenka (born 1995), Belarusian professional footballer

== Gallery ==
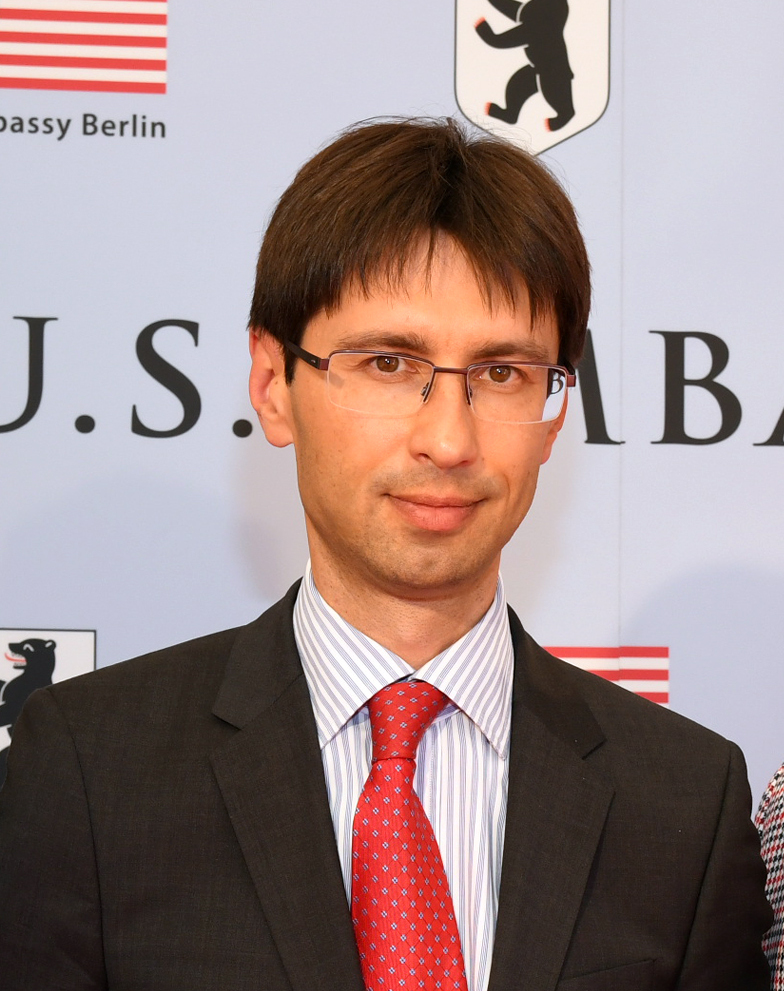
Dzianis Sidarenka

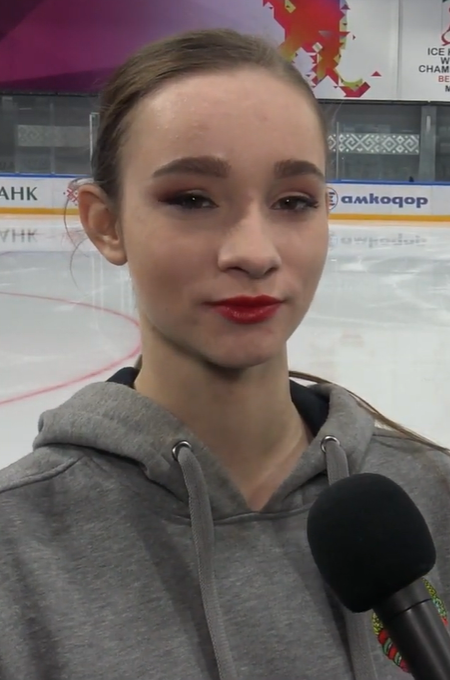
Karina Sidarenka
