= List of diplomatic missions of Belarus =

This is a list of diplomatic missions of Belarus. Belarus has been the most eager nation of the former Soviet Union to integrate more closely and to re-engage with former Soviet states, and this is reflected in the location of its missions. The website of the Ministry of Foreign Affairs calls the equivalent of its consulates in Russia "divisions".

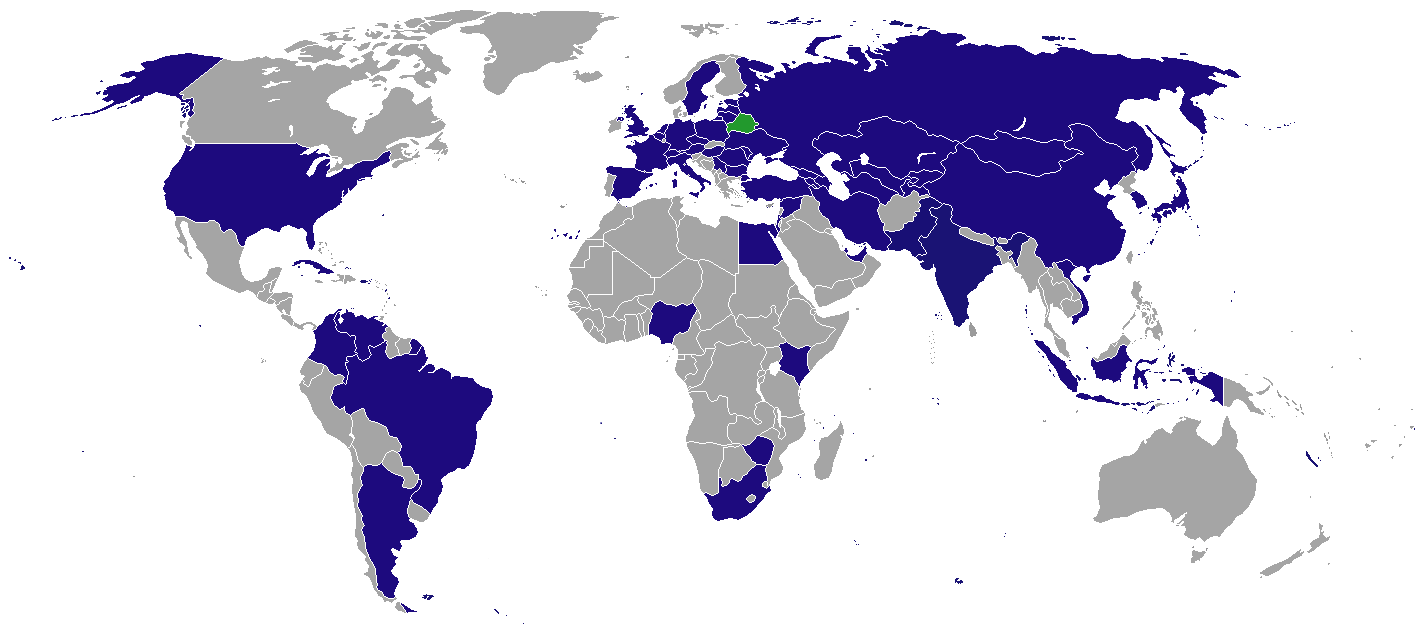
Diplomatic missions of Belarus

== Current missions ==
=== Africa ===
Host country	Host city	Mission	Concurrent accreditation	Ref.
Egypt	Cairo	Embassy	Countries: Algeria; Libya; Oman; Sudan	
Kenya	Nairobi	Embassy	Countries: Ethiopia; Tanzania; Uganda; International Organizations: African Union; United Nations; United Nations Environment Programme; United Nations Human Settlements Programme	
Libya	Benghazi	Consulate		
Nigeria	Abuja	Embassy	Countries: Cameroon; Ghana; Ivory Coast	
South Africa	Pretoria	Embassy	Countries: Botswana; Namibia	
Zimbabwe	Harare	Embassy	Countries: Angola; Mozambique; Zambia	

=== Americas ===
Host country	Host city	Mission	Concurrent accreditation	Ref.
Argentina	Buenos Aires	Embassy	Countries: Chile; Peru	
Brazil	Brasília	Embassy	Countries: Paraguay; Uruguay	
Colombia	Bogotá	Embassy	Countries: Panama	
Cuba	Havana	Embassy	Countries: Dominican Republic; Nicaragua	
United States	Washington, D.C.	Embassy	Countries: Canada; Mexico	
Venezuela	Caracas	Embassy	Countries: Bolivia; Ecuador	

=== Asia ===
Host country	Host city	Mission	Concurrent accreditation	Ref.
Armenia	Yerevan	Embassy		
Azerbaijan	Baku	Embassy		
China	Beijing	Embassy		
China	Chongqing	Consulate-General		
China	Guangzhou	Consulate-General		
China	Hong Kong	Consulate-General		
China	Shanghai	Consulate-General		
Georgia	Tbilisi	Embassy		
India	New Delhi	Embassy	Countries: Bangladesh; Nepal; Sri Lanka	
India	Mumbai	Consulate-General	Countries: Bangladesh; Nepal; Sri Lanka	
Indonesia	Jakarta	Embassy	Countries: Malaysia; Philippines; Singapore; International Organizations: Association of Southeast Asian Nations (Note: Accredited as an observer mission.)	
Iran	Tehran	Embassy		
Israel	Tel Aviv	Embassy		
Japan	Tokyo	Embassy	Countries: Australia; New Zealand	
Kazakhstan	Astana	Embassy		
Kyrgyzstan	Bishkek	Embassy		
Mongolia	Ulaanbaatar	Embassy		
Myanmar	Naypyidaw	Embassy		
North Korea	Pyongyang	Embassy		
Pakistan	Islamabad	Embassy		
Qatar	Doha	Embassy		
South Korea	Seoul	Embassy		
Syria	Damascus	Embassy		
Tajikistan	Dushanbe	Embassy	Countries: Afghanistan	
Turkey	Ankara	Embassy	Countries: Iraq	
Turkey	Istanbul	Consulate-General	Countries: Iraq	
Turkmenistan	Ashgabat	Embassy		
United Arab Emirates	Abu Dhabi	Embassy	Countries: Bahrain; Kuwait; Saudi Arabia	
United Arab Emirates	Dubai	Consulate-General	Countries: Bahrain; Kuwait; Saudi Arabia	
Uzbekistan	Tashkent	Embassy		
Vietnam	Hanoi	Embassy	Countries: Cambodia; Laos; Thailand	
Vietnam	Ho Chi Minh City	Consulate-General	Countries: Cambodia; Laos; Thailand	

=== Europe ===
Host country	Host city	Mission	Concurrent accreditation	Ref.
Austria	Vienna	Embassy	Countries: Slovenia; International Organizations: United Nations; CTBTO Preparatory Commission; International Atomic Energy Agency; OSCE; United Nations Industrial Development Organization; United Nations Office on Drugs and Crime; UNSCEAR	
Belgium	Brussels	Embassy	Countries: Luxembourg; International Organizations: European Union; NATO	
Bulgaria	Sofia	Embassy	Countries: Cyprus; Greece	
Czechia	Prague	Embassy		
Estonia	Tallinn	Embassy		
France	Paris	Embassy	Countries: Monaco; Portugal	
Germany	Berlin	Embassy		
Germany	Munich	Consulate-General		
Holy See	Rome	Embassy	Sovereign Entity: Sovereign Military Order of Malta	
Hungary	Budapest	Embassy	Countries: Bosnia and Herzegovina; Croatia	
Italy	Rome	Embassy	Countries: Malta; San Marino; International Organizations: Food and Agriculture Organization	
Latvia	Riga	Embassy		
Latvia	Daugavpils	Consulate-General		
Lithuania	Vilnius	Embassy		
Moldova	Chişinău	Embassy		
Netherlands	The Hague	Embassy	International Organizations: OPCW	
Poland	Warsaw	Embassy		
Poland	Białystok	Consulate-General		
Poland	Biała Podlaska	Consulate		
Romania	Bucharest	Embassy		
Russia	Moscow	Embassy		
Russia	Kaliningrad	Consulate-General		
Russia	Kazan	Consulate-General		
Russia	Nizhniy Novgorod	Consulate-General		
Russia	Rostov-on-Don	Consulate-General		
Russia	Saint Petersburg	Consulate-General		
Russia	Ufa	Consulate-General		
Russia	Vladivostok	Consulate-General		
Russia	Yekaterinburg	Consulate-General		
Russia	Krasnoyarsk	Embassy division office		
Russia	Novosibirsk	Embassy division office		
Russia	Smolensk	Embassy division office		
Serbia	Belgrade	Embassy	Countries: Montenegro; North Macedonia	
Slovakia	Bratislava	Embassy		
Spain	Madrid	Embassy	International Organizations: World Tourism Organization	
Sweden	Stockholm	Embassy	Countries: Norway	
Switzerland	Bern	Embassy	Countries: Liechtenstein	
Ukraine	Kyiv	Embassy		
United Kingdom	London	Embassy	Countries: Ireland; International Organizations: International Maritime Organization	

=== Multilateral organizations ===
Organization	Host city	Host country	Mission	Concurrent accreditation	Ref.
United Nations	Geneva	Switzerland	Permanent Mission		
United Nations	New York City	United States	Permanent Mission	Countries: Guatemala	<
UNESCO	Paris	France	Permanent Mission		

== Gallery ==
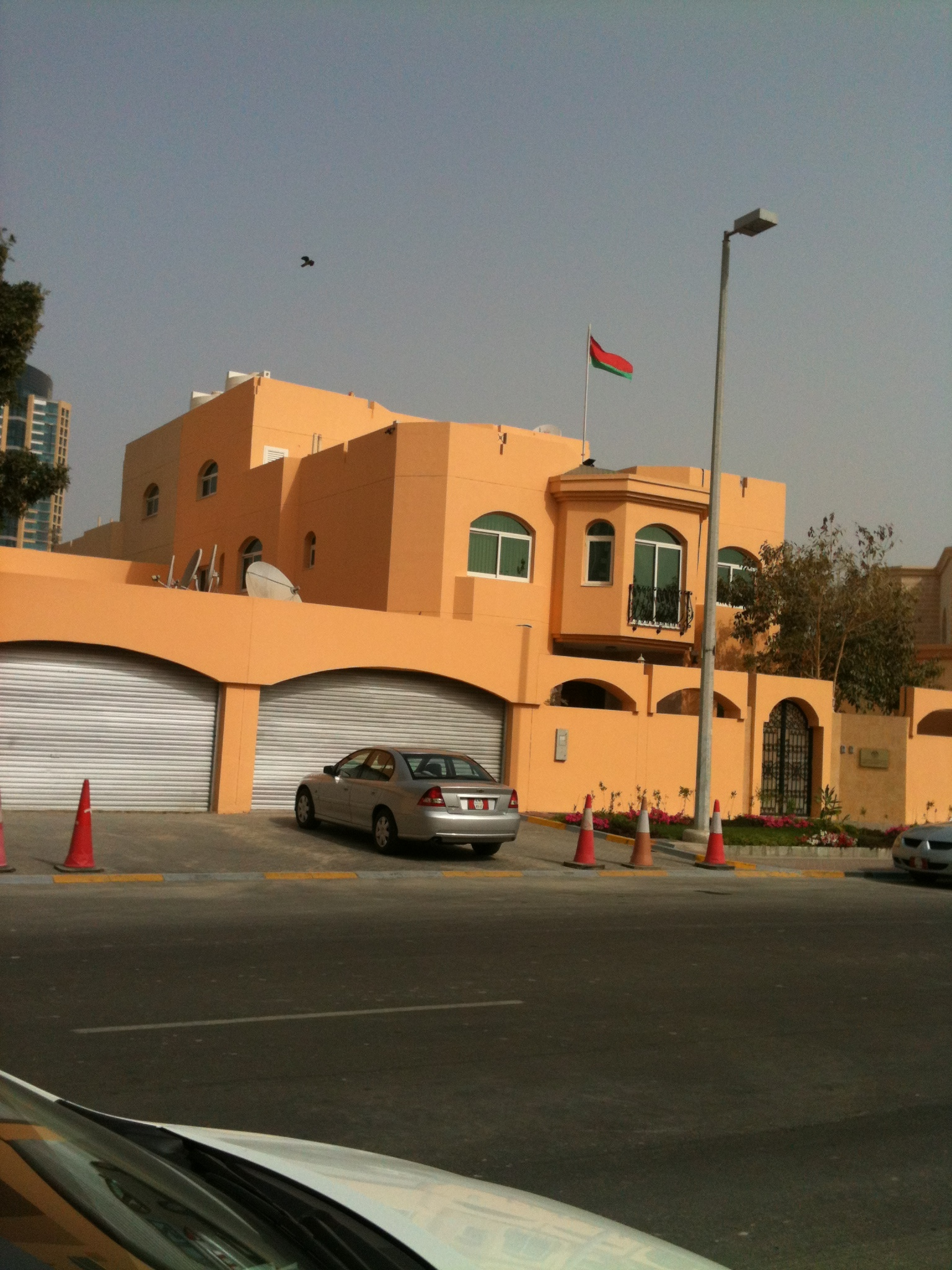
Embassy in Abu Dhabi

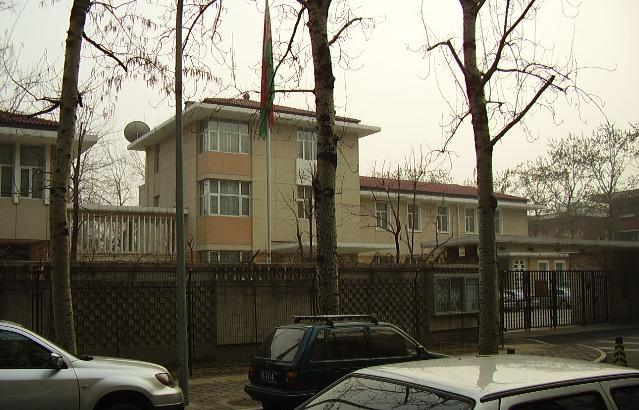
Embassy in Beijing

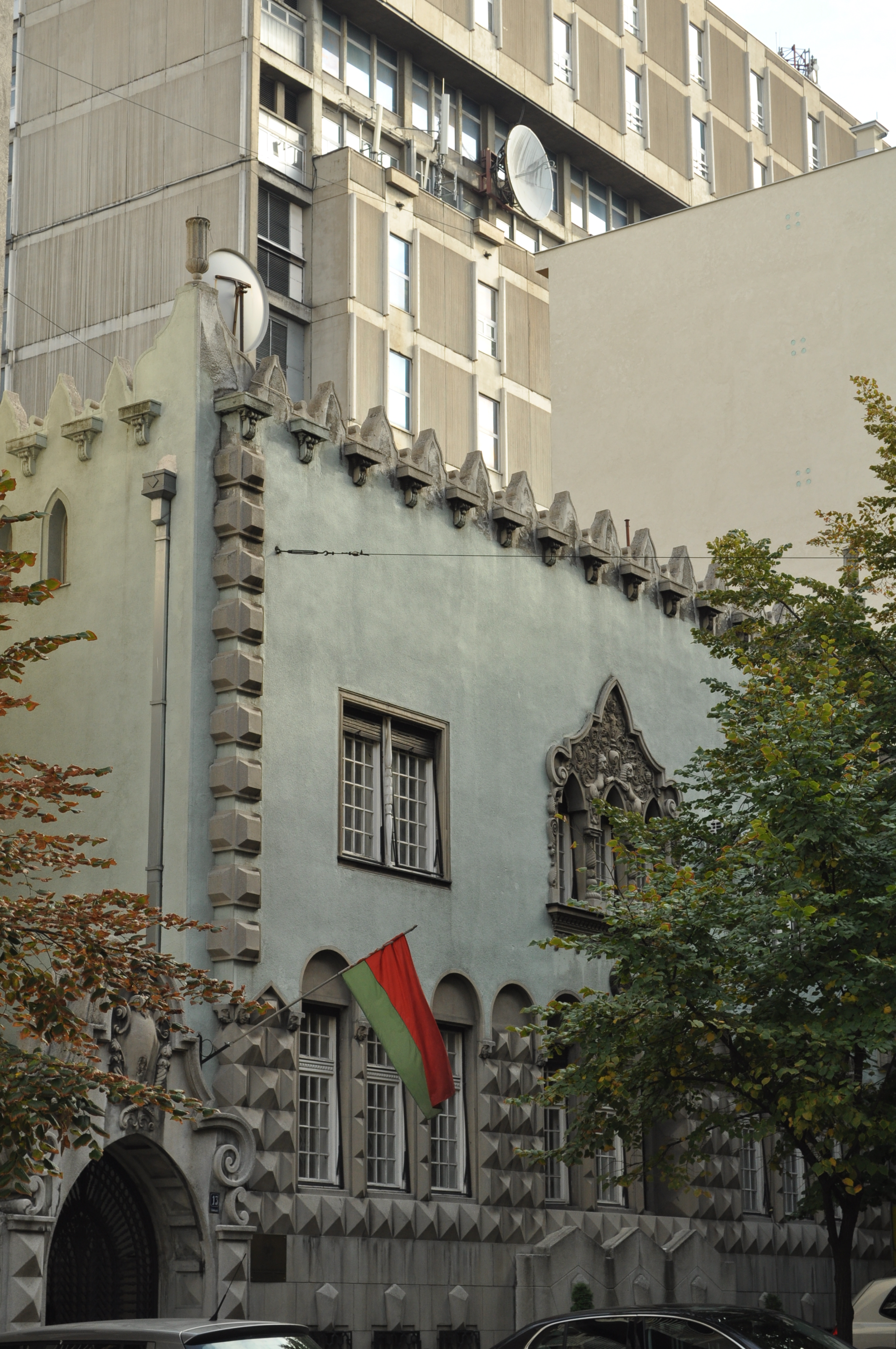
Embassy in Belgrade

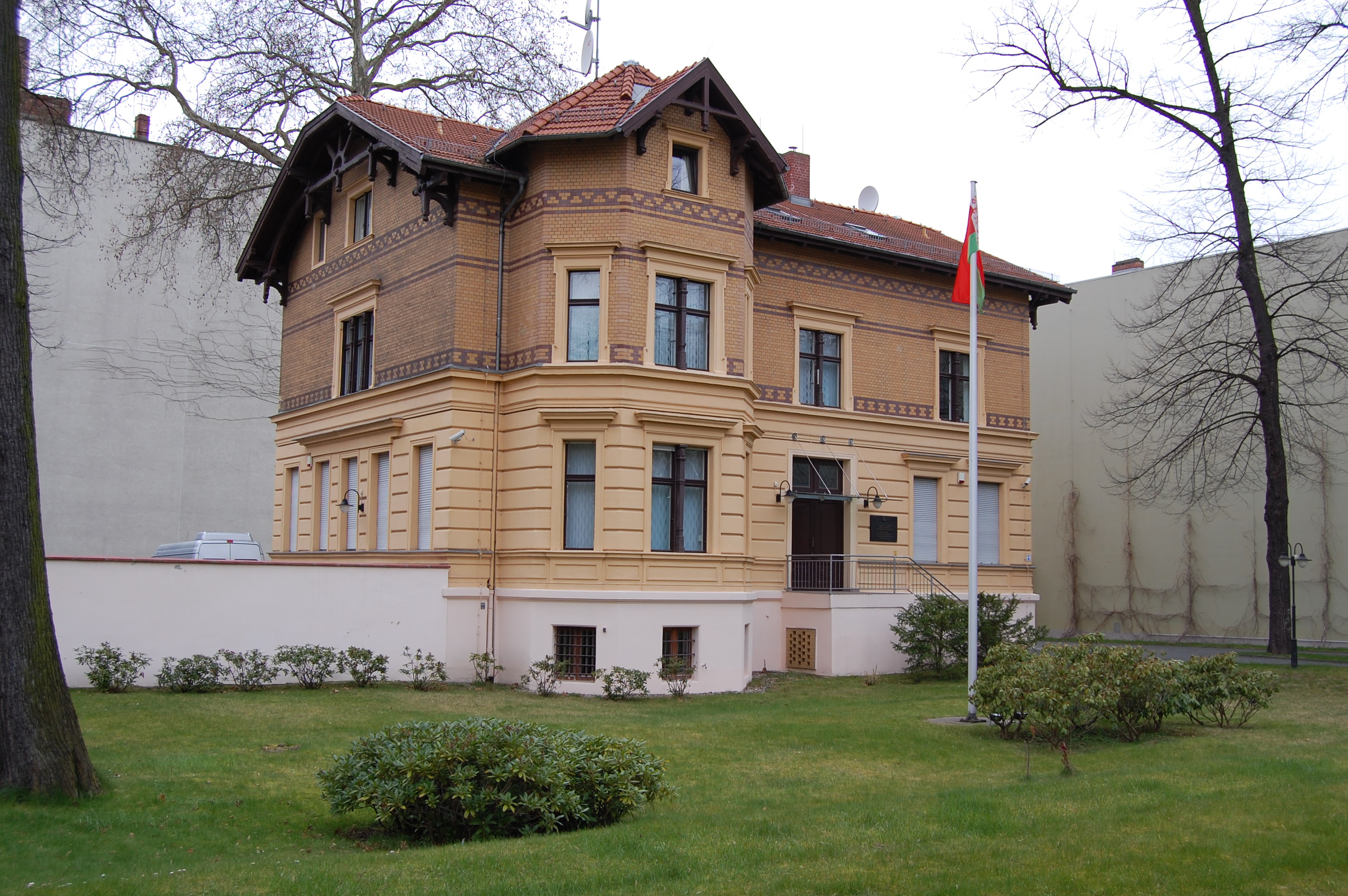
Embassy in Berlin

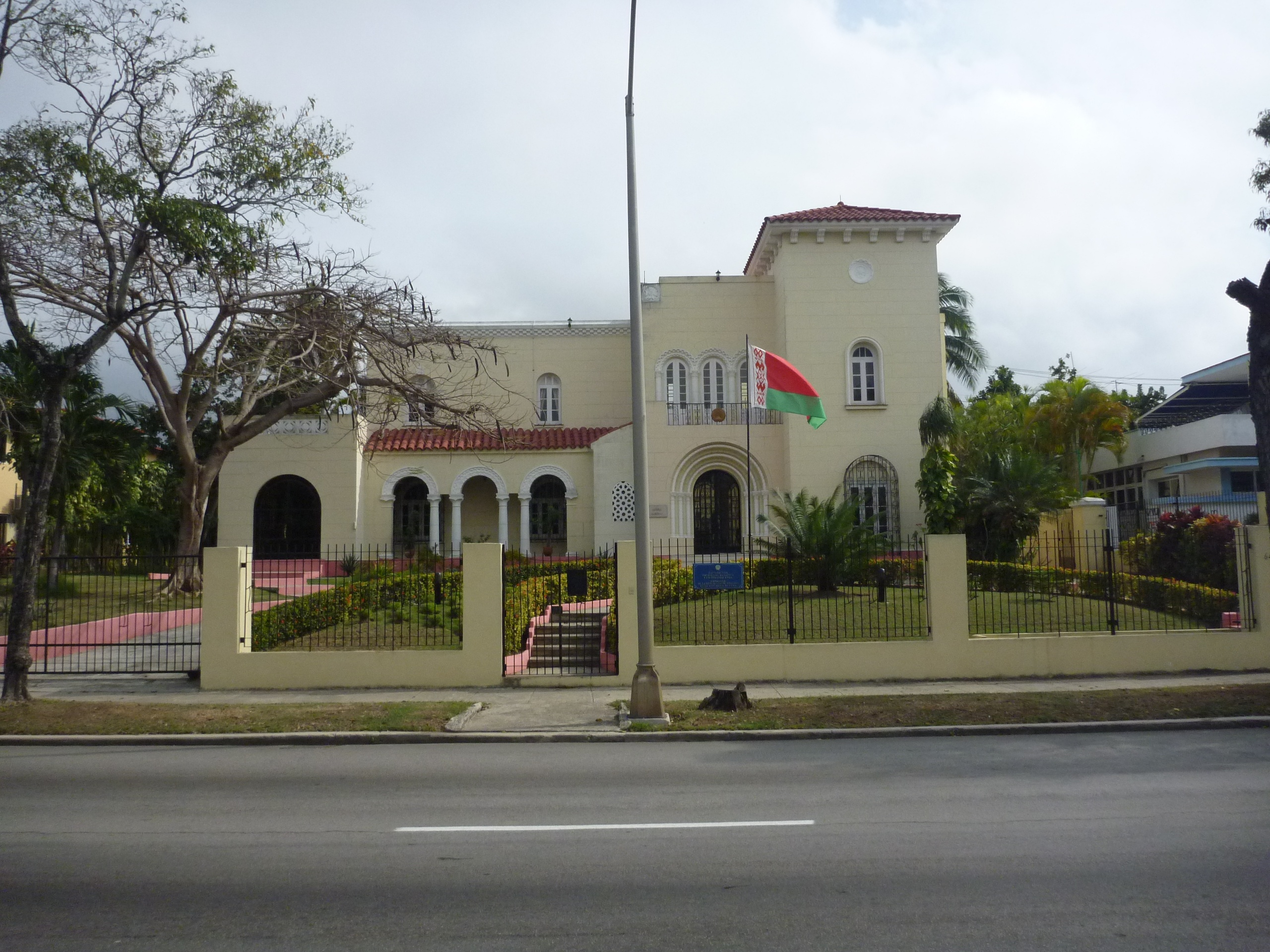
Embassy in Havana

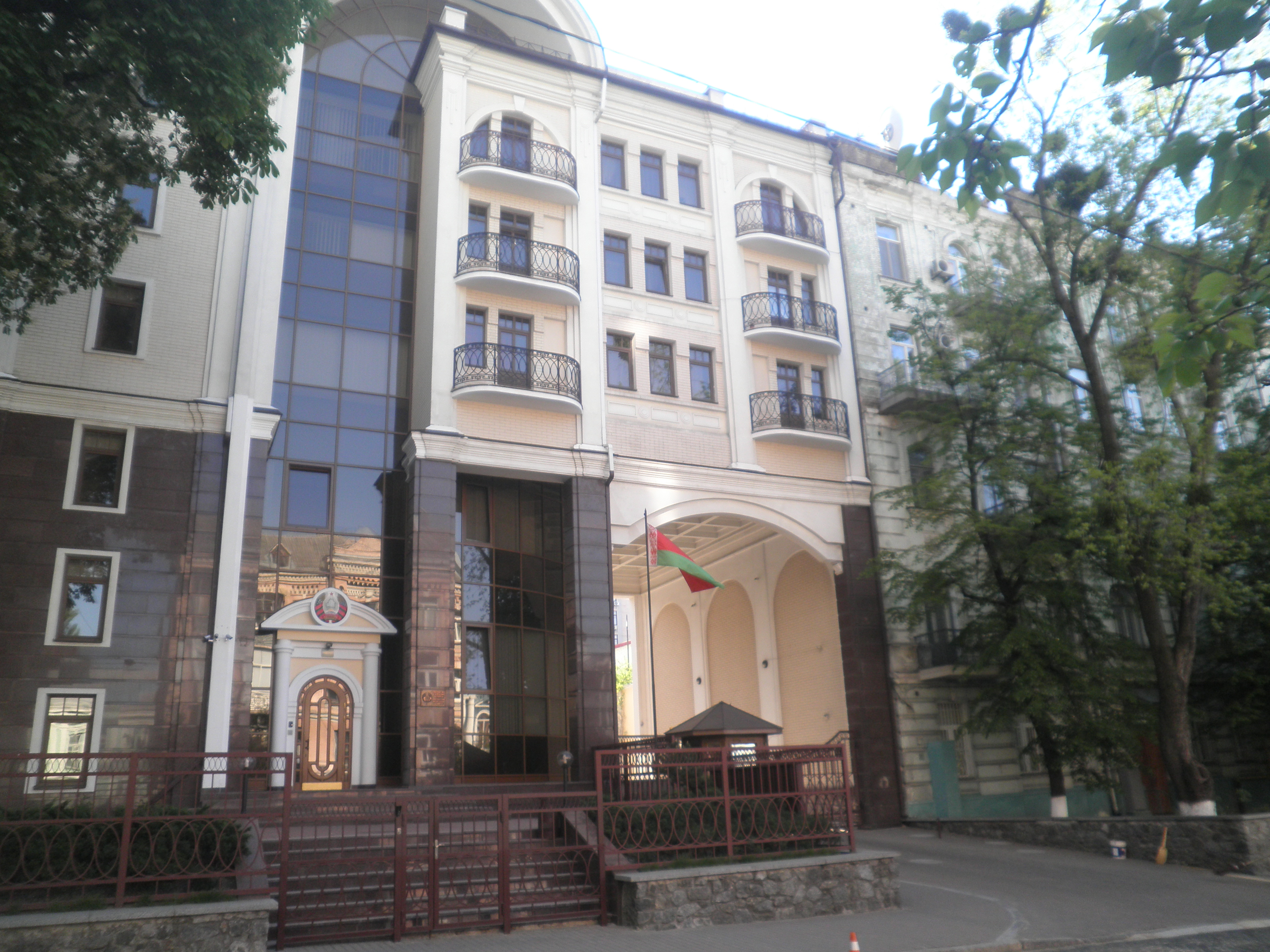
Embassy in Kyiv

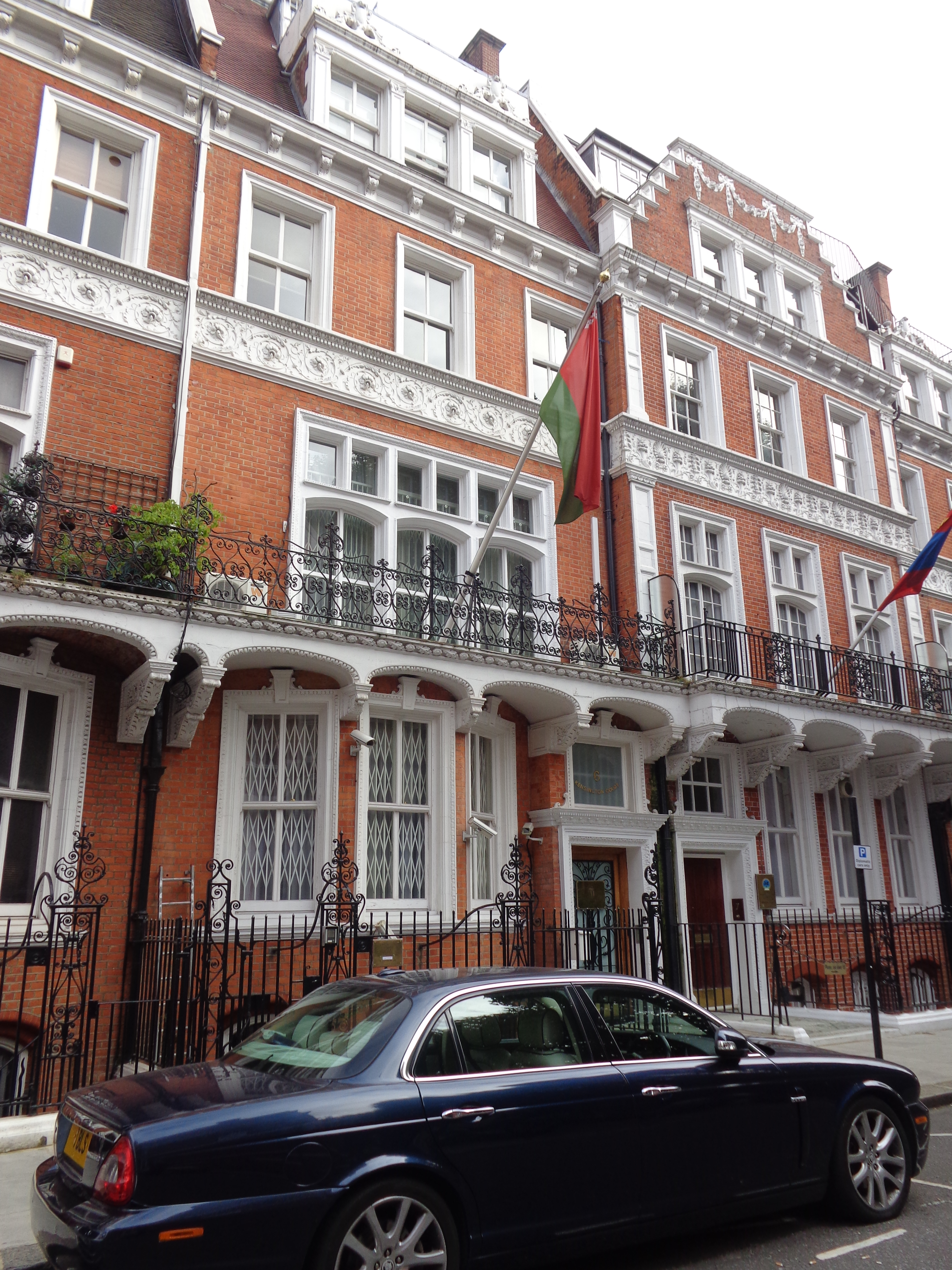
Embassy in London

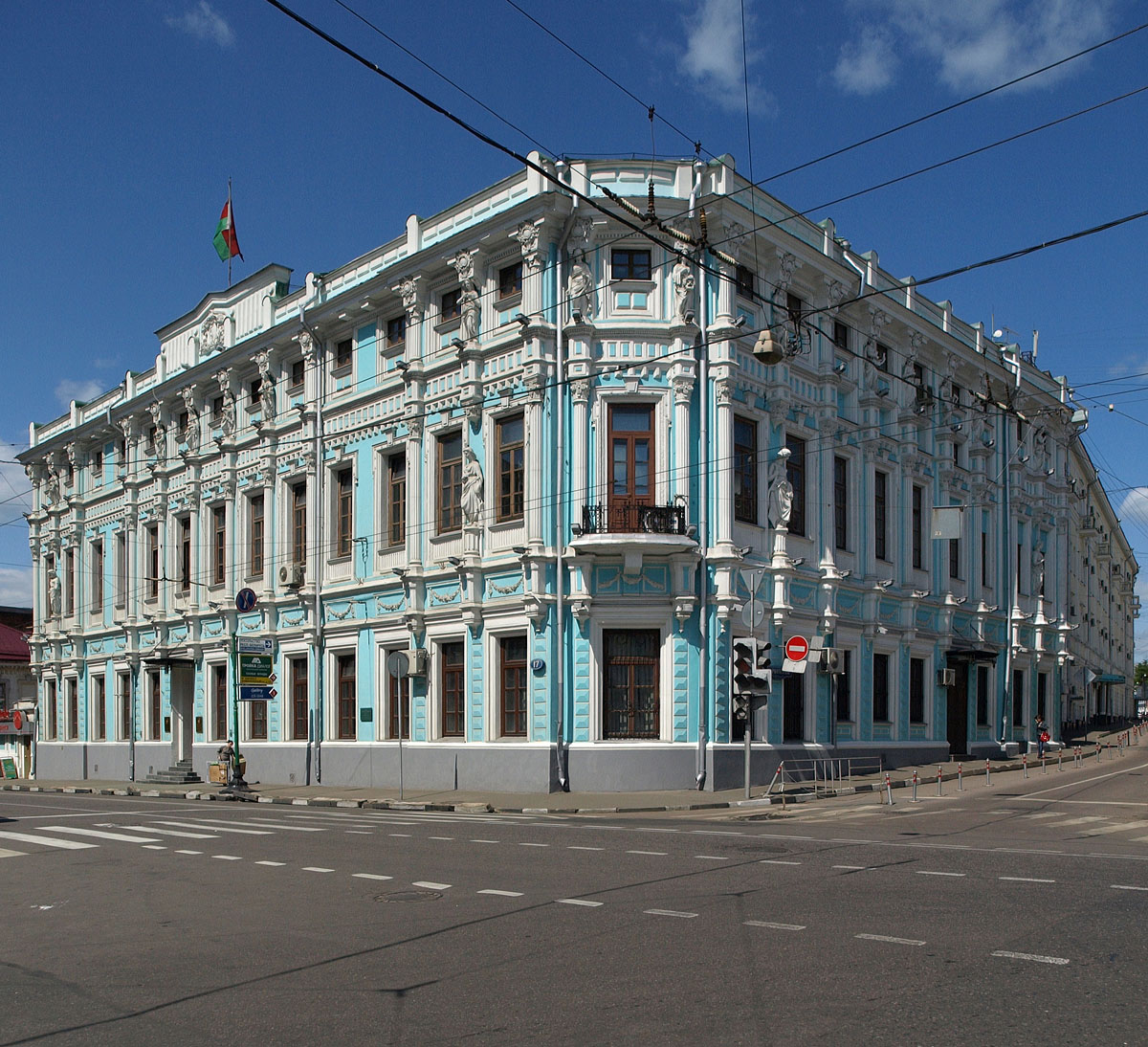
Embassy in Moscow

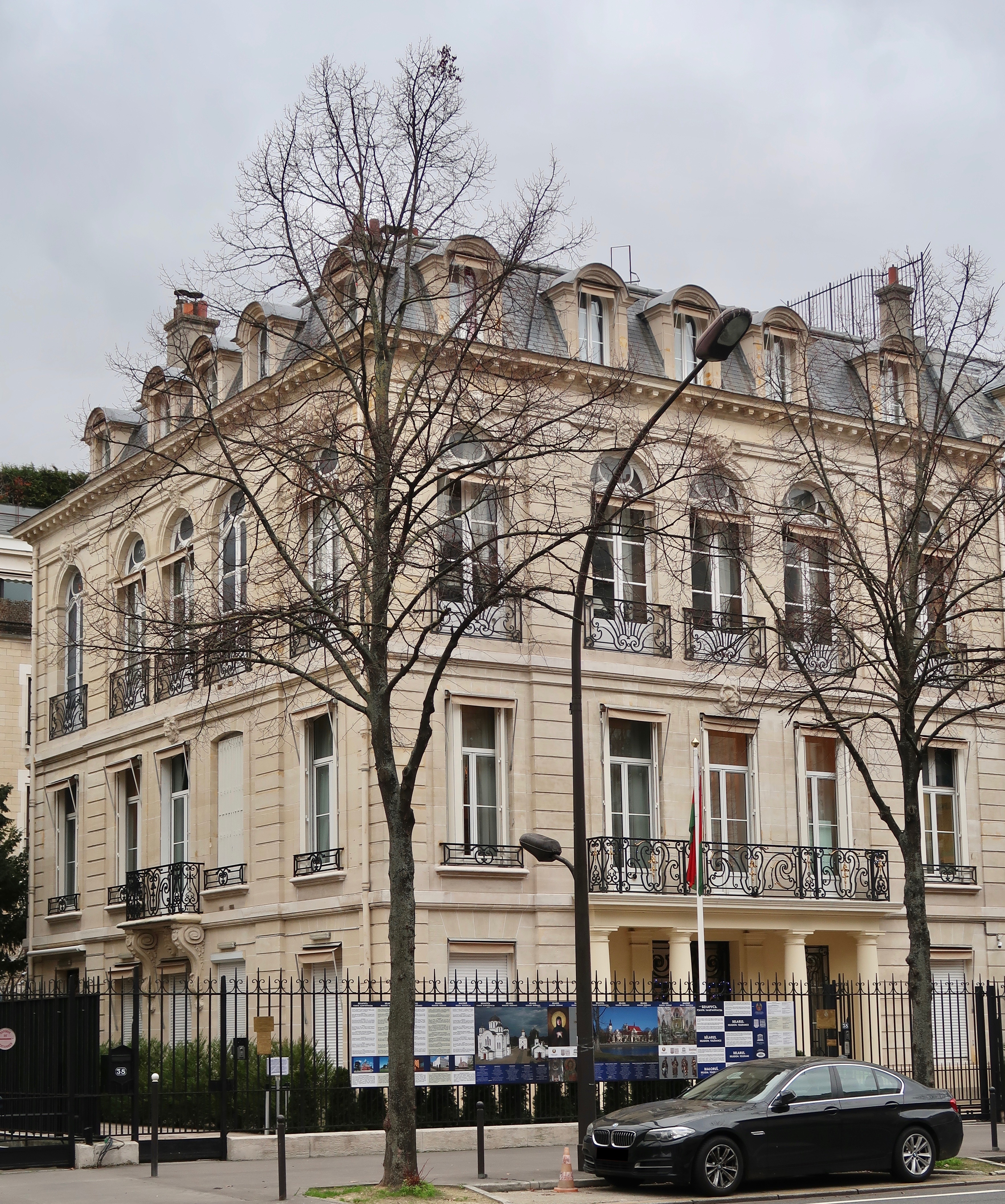
Embassy in Paris

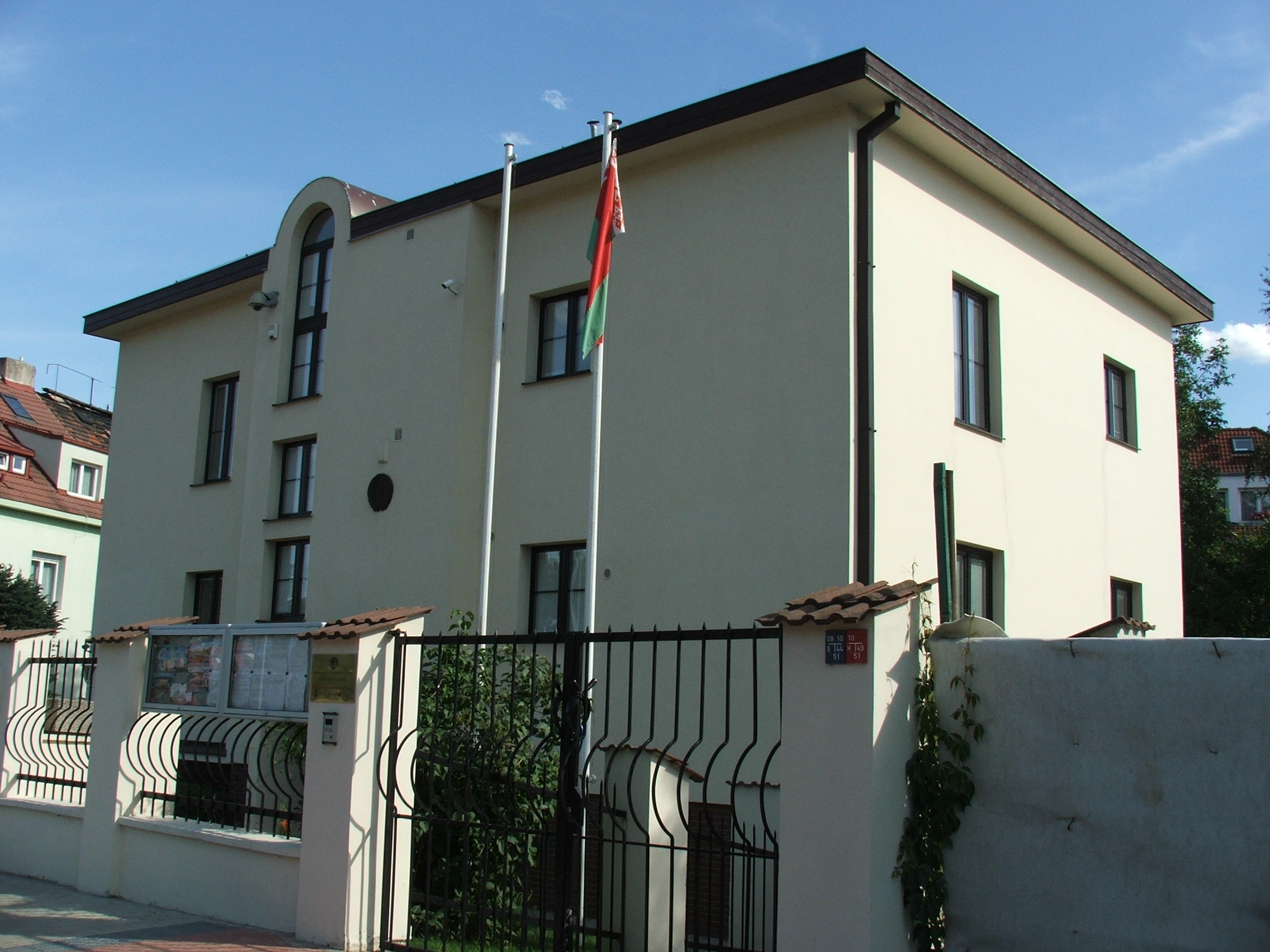
Embassy in Prague

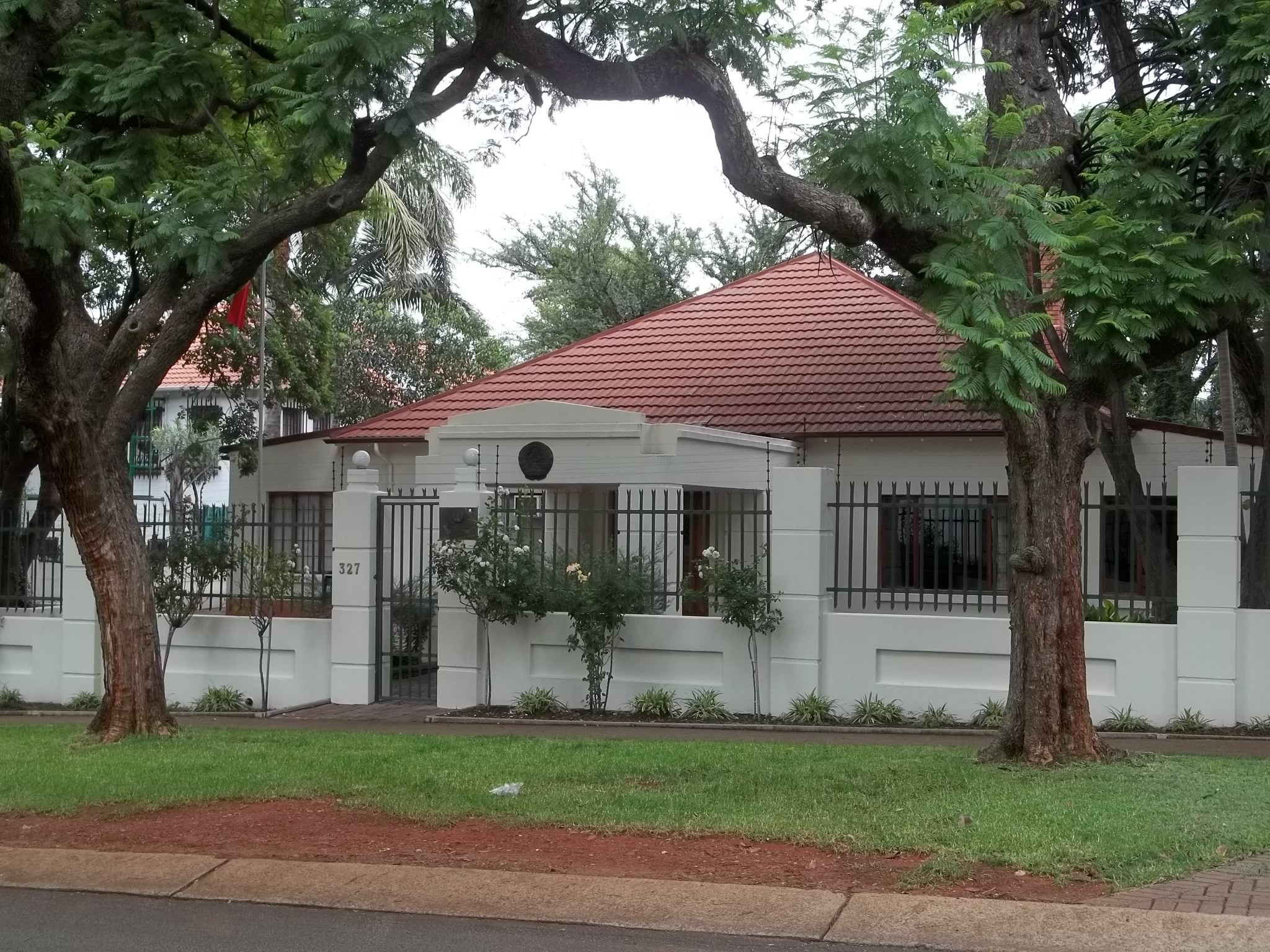
Embassy in Pretoria

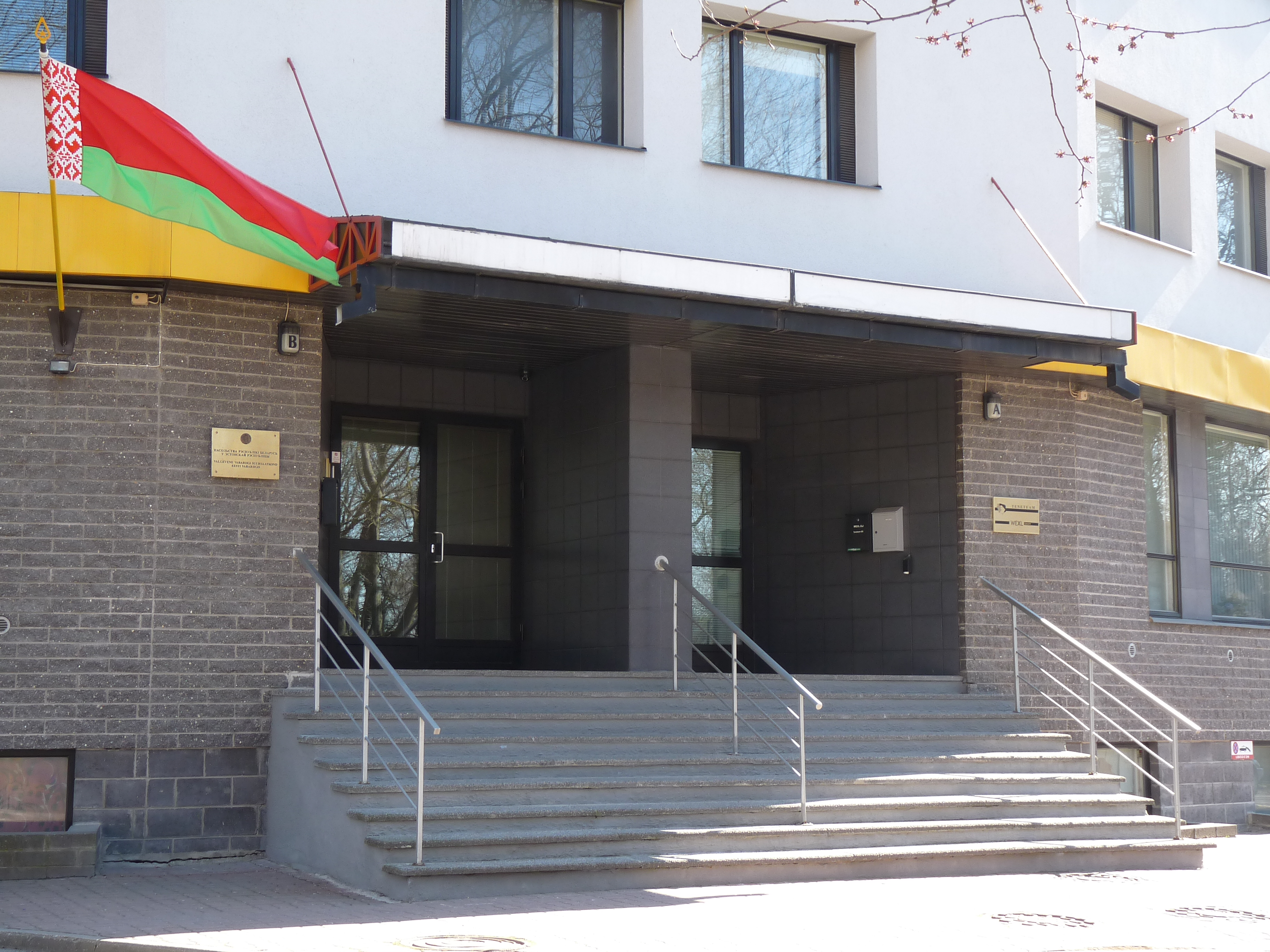
Embassy in Tallinn

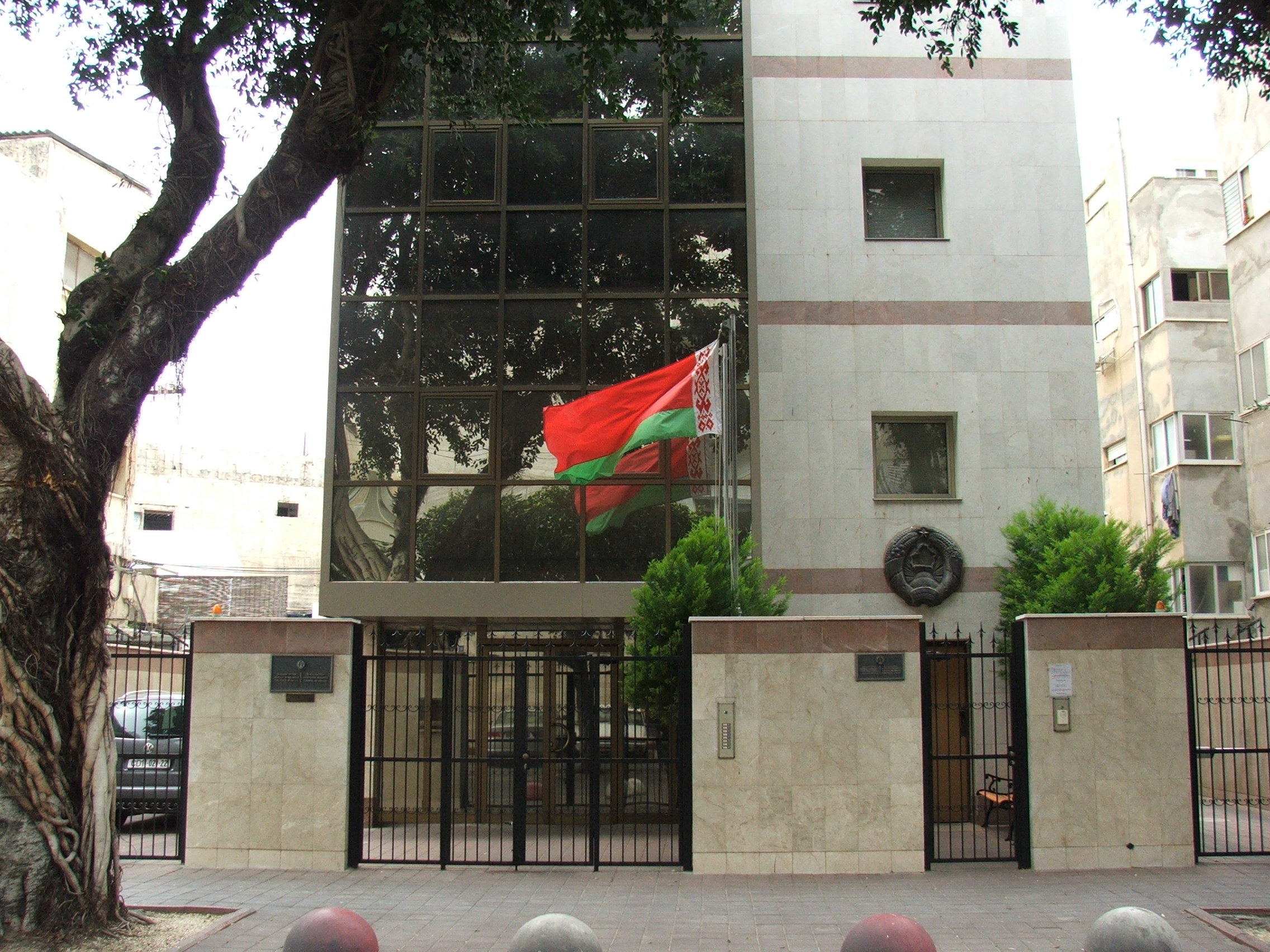
Embassy in Tel Aviv

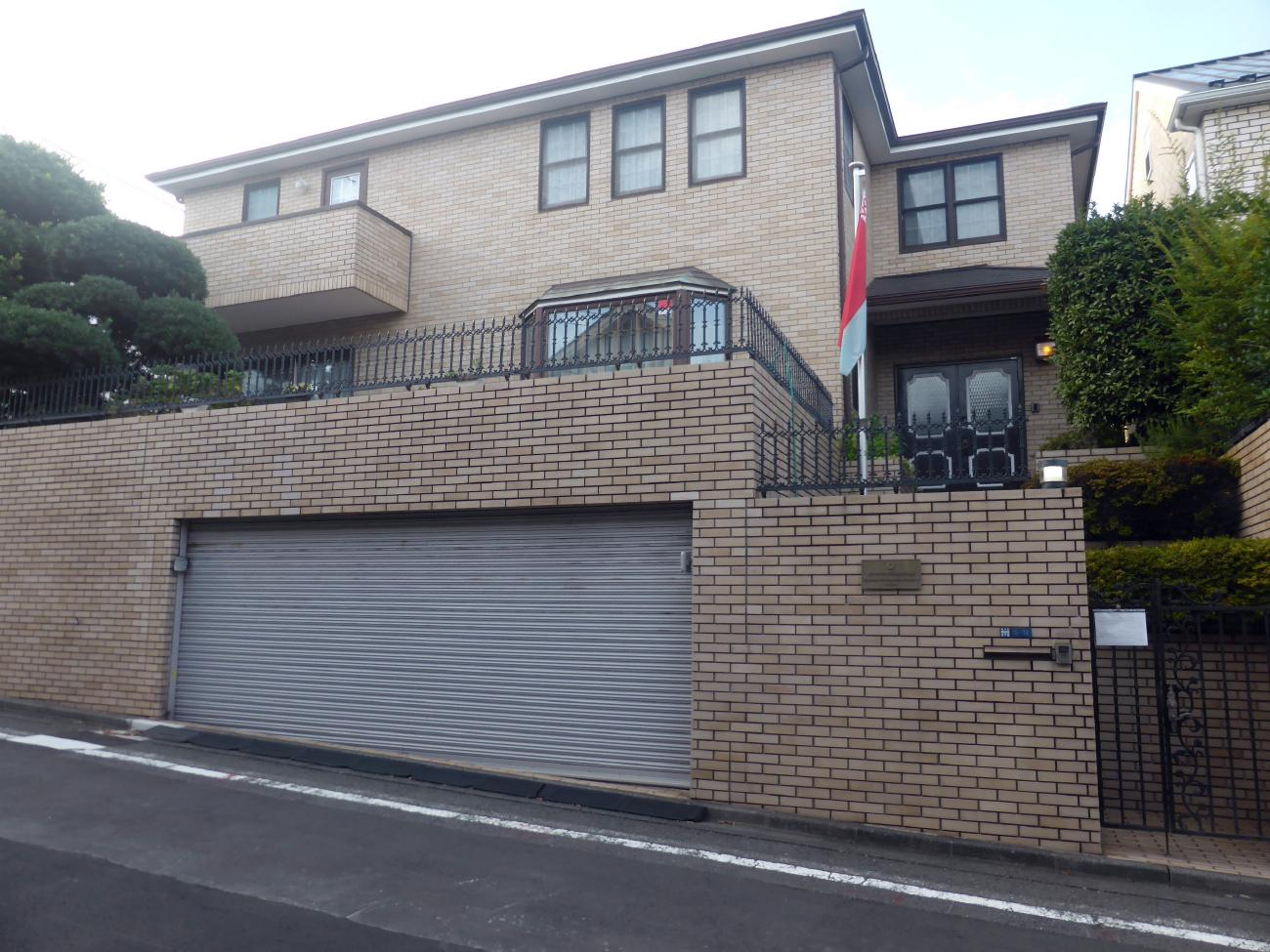
Embassy in Tokyo

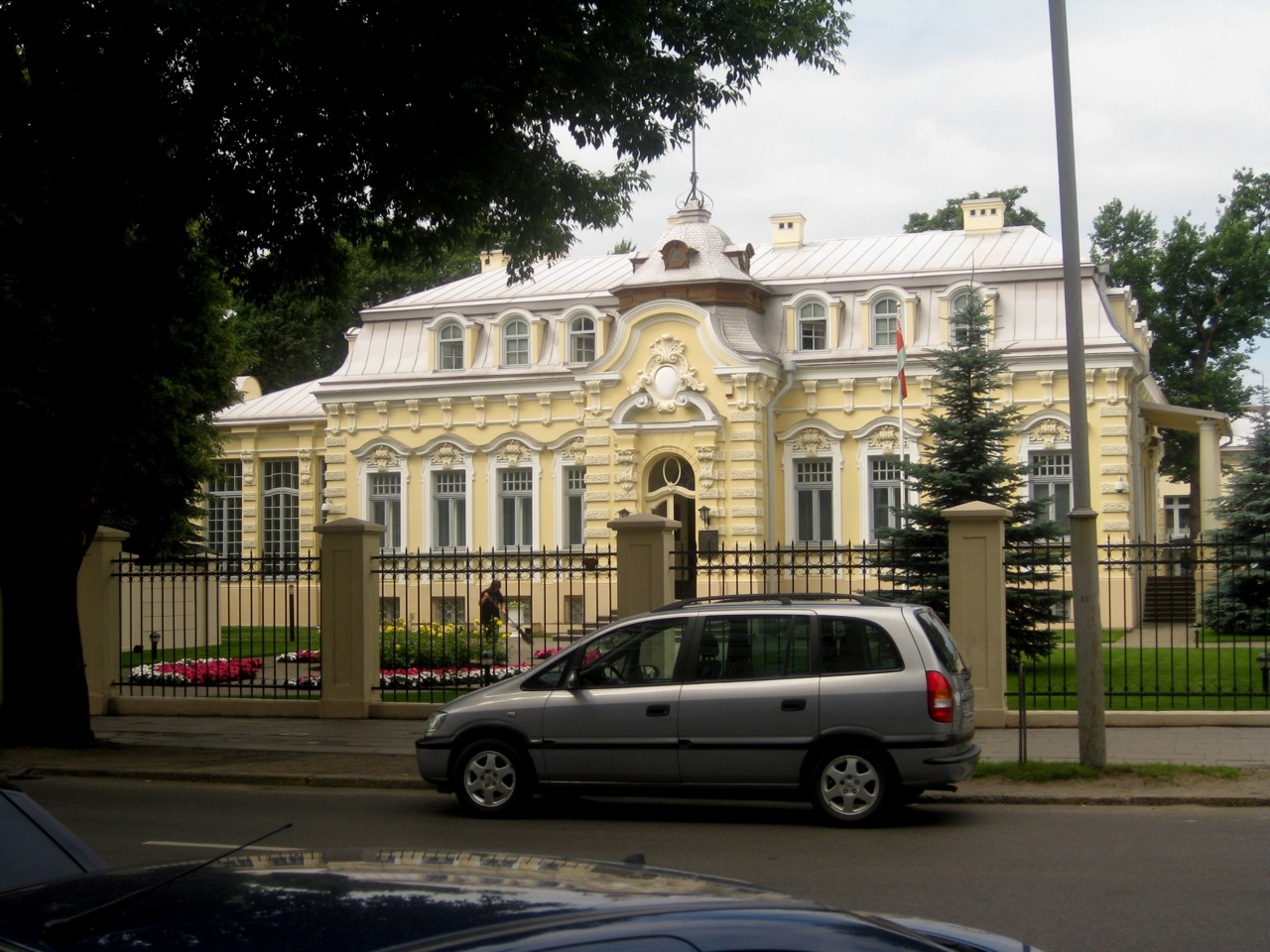
Embassy in Vilnius

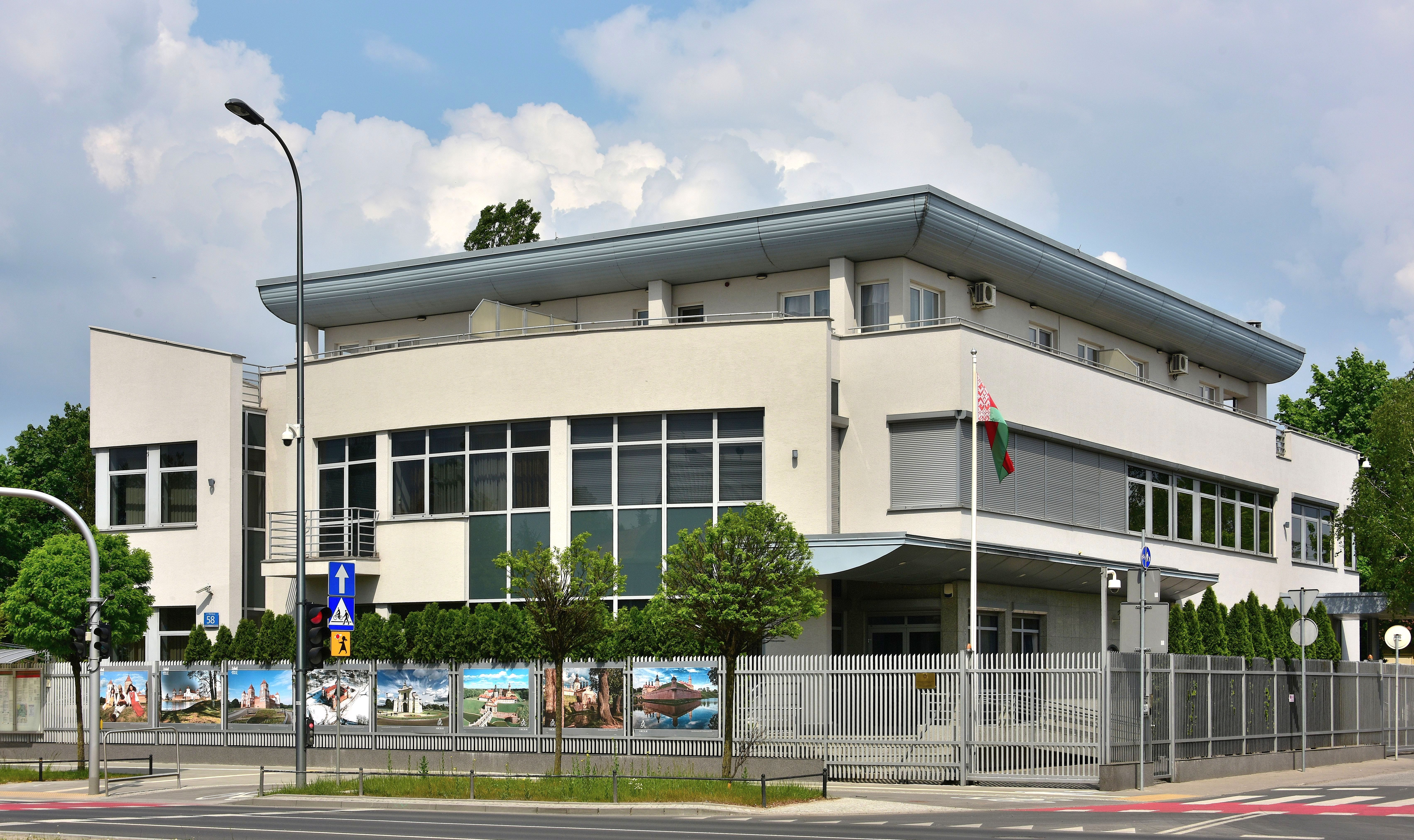
Embassy in Warsaw

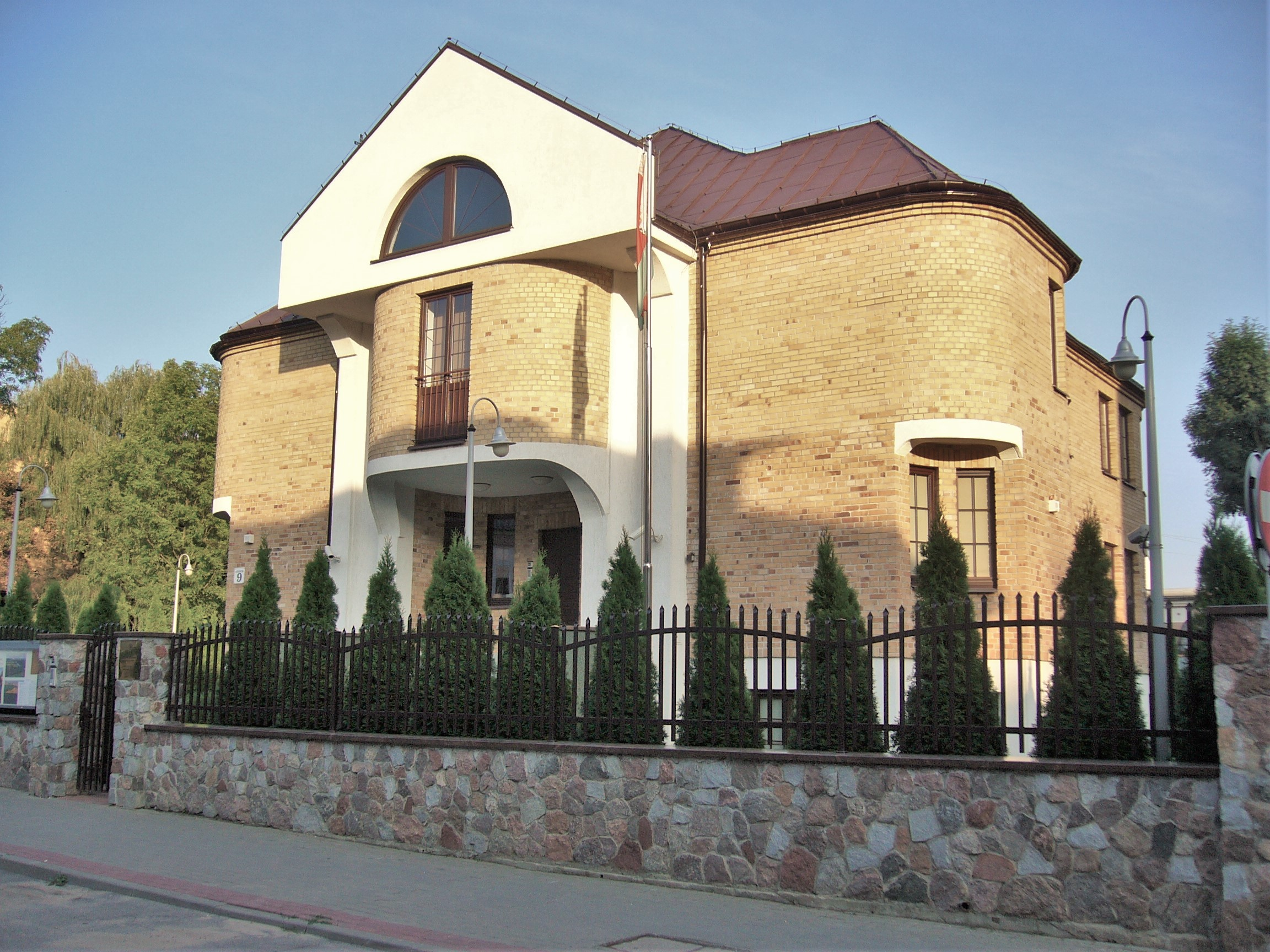
Consulate-General in Białystok

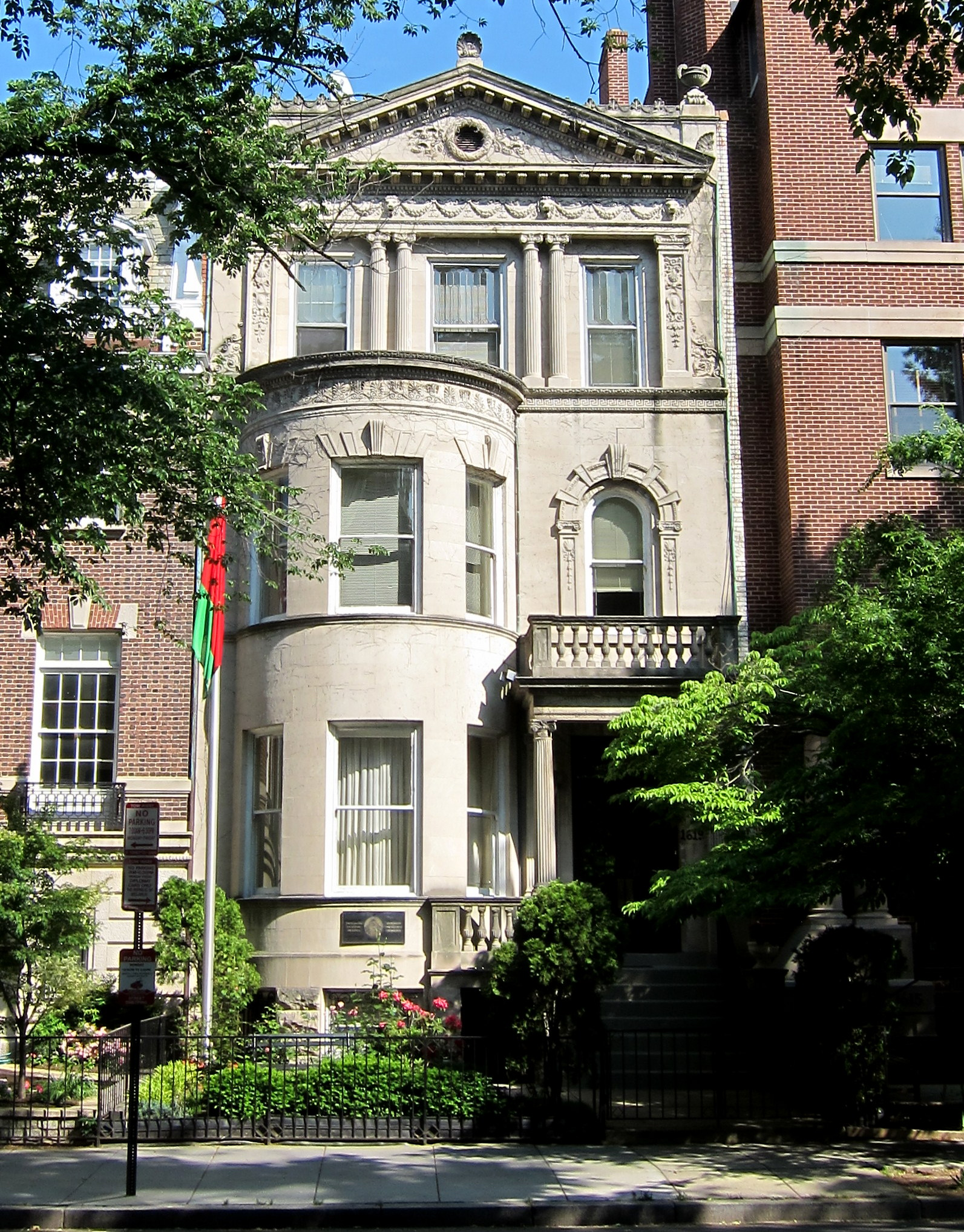
Embassy in Washington, D.C.

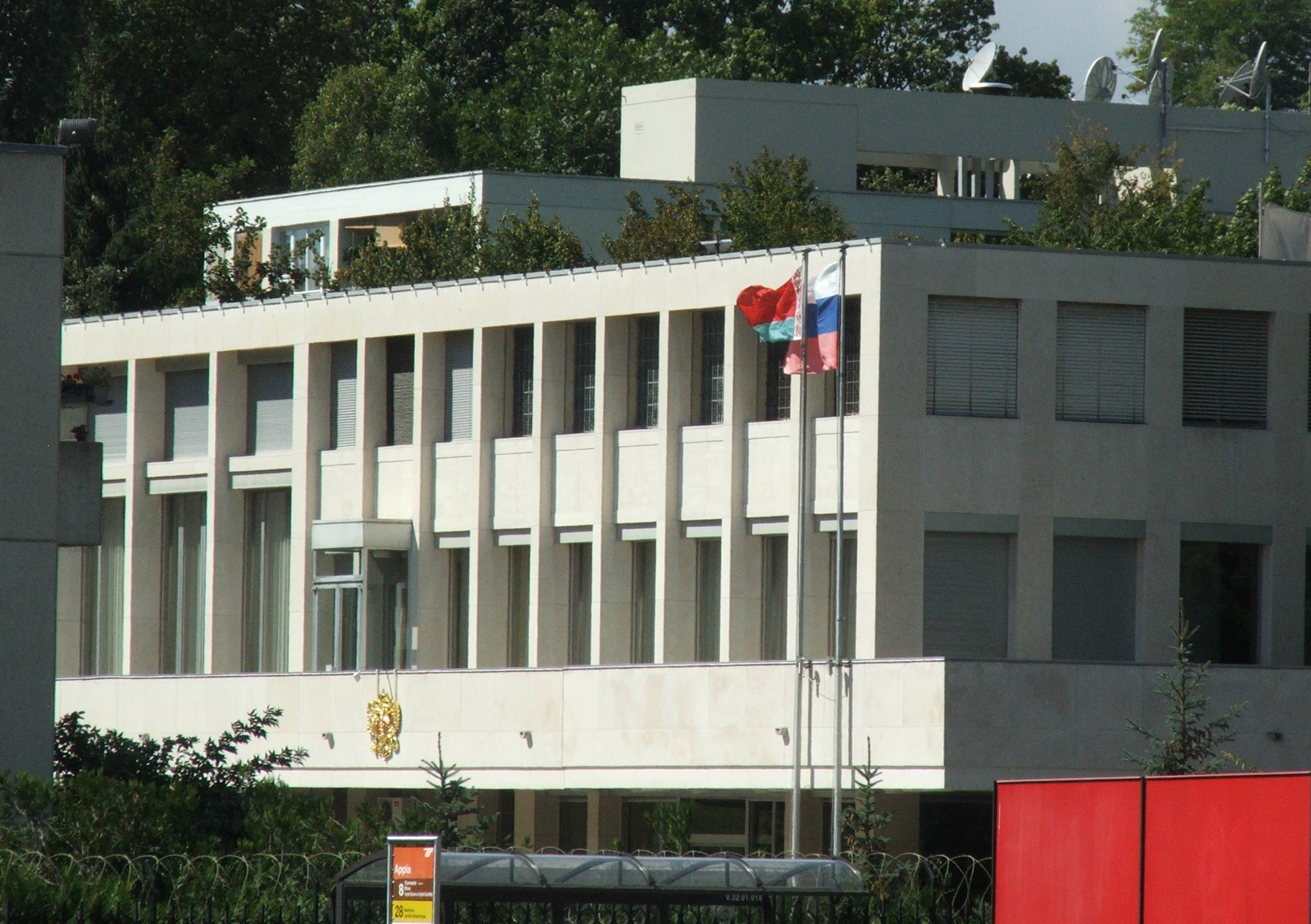
Permanent Mission to the U.N. in Geneva

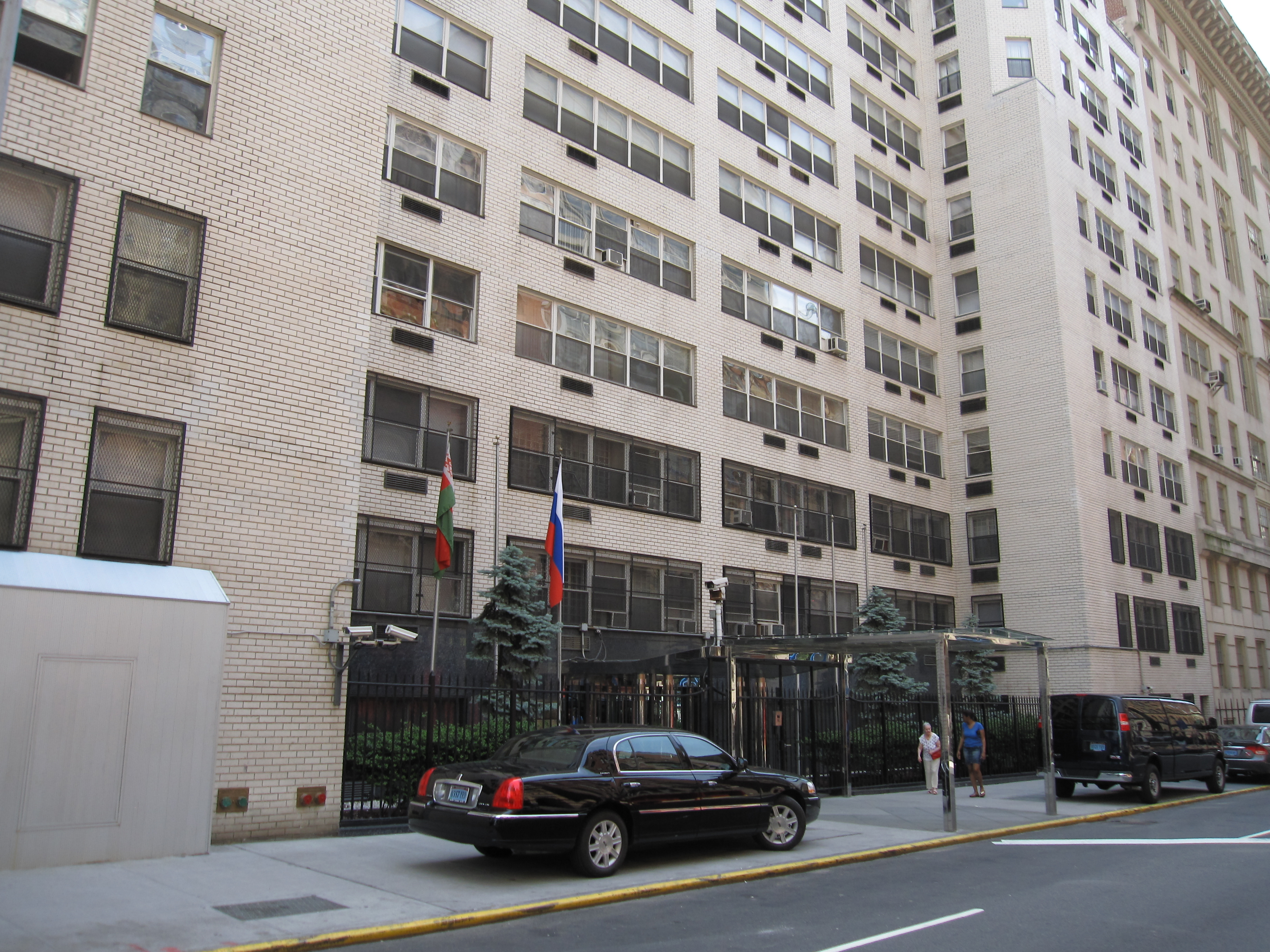
Permanent Mission to the U.N. in New York City

== Closed missions ==
=== Africa ===
Host country	Host city	Mission	Year closed	Ref.
Equatorial Guinea	Malabo	Embassy	2026	
Ethiopia	Addis Ababa	Embassy	2018	
Libya	Tripoli	Embassy	2014	

=== Americas ===
Host country	Host city	Mission	Year closed	Ref.
Canada	Ottawa	Embassy	2021	
Ecuador	Quito	Embassy	2021	
United States	New York City	Consulate-General	2021	

=== Europe ===
Host country	Host city	Mission	Year closed	Ref.
Finland	Helsinki	Embassy	2026	
Germany	Bonn	Embassy branch office	2013	
Italy	Milan	Consulate-General	2018	
Poland	Gdańsk	Consulate-General	2018	
Russia	Khabarovsk	Embassy division office	2021	
Ukraine	Odesa	Consulate-General	2018	

=== Oceania ===
Host country	Host city	Mission	Year closed	Ref.
Australia	Canberra	Embassy	2018	

== See also ==
- Foreign relations of Belarus
- List of diplomatic missions in Belarus
- Visa policy of Belarus
