= Piatro Sadoŭski =

Belarusian politician, diplomat and activist (1941–2026)

- Пятро Садоўскі

1st Belarus Ambassador to Germany
- In office 3 June 1992 – 28 October 1994
- Preceded by: none
- Succeeded by: Piotr Bialiayeu

Personal details
- Born: 1941
- Died: 5 July 2026 (aged 85)
- Party: Belarusian Popular Front, Partyja BNF
- Profession: Linguist
- Awards: Belarusian Democratic Republic 100th Jubilee Medal

Piatro Sadoŭski (Belarusian: Пятро Садоўскі; 1941 – 5 July 2026) was a Belarusian linguist, politician and diplomat.

Between 1992 and 1994 Sadoŭski served as first ambassador of independent Belarus to Germany.

Before and after the appointment, Piatro Sadoŭski was a member of the parliament of Belarus from the Belarusian Popular Front.

In 1995, he participated in the hunger strike organized by the opposition parliament members as a protest against the initiation of the Referendum on new state symbols and on the status of the Belarusian language.

Sadoŭski died on 5 July 2026, at the age of 85.

== See also ==
- Embassy of Belarus, Berlin
