= Embassy of Belarus, Berlin =

Embassy of Belarus in Germany
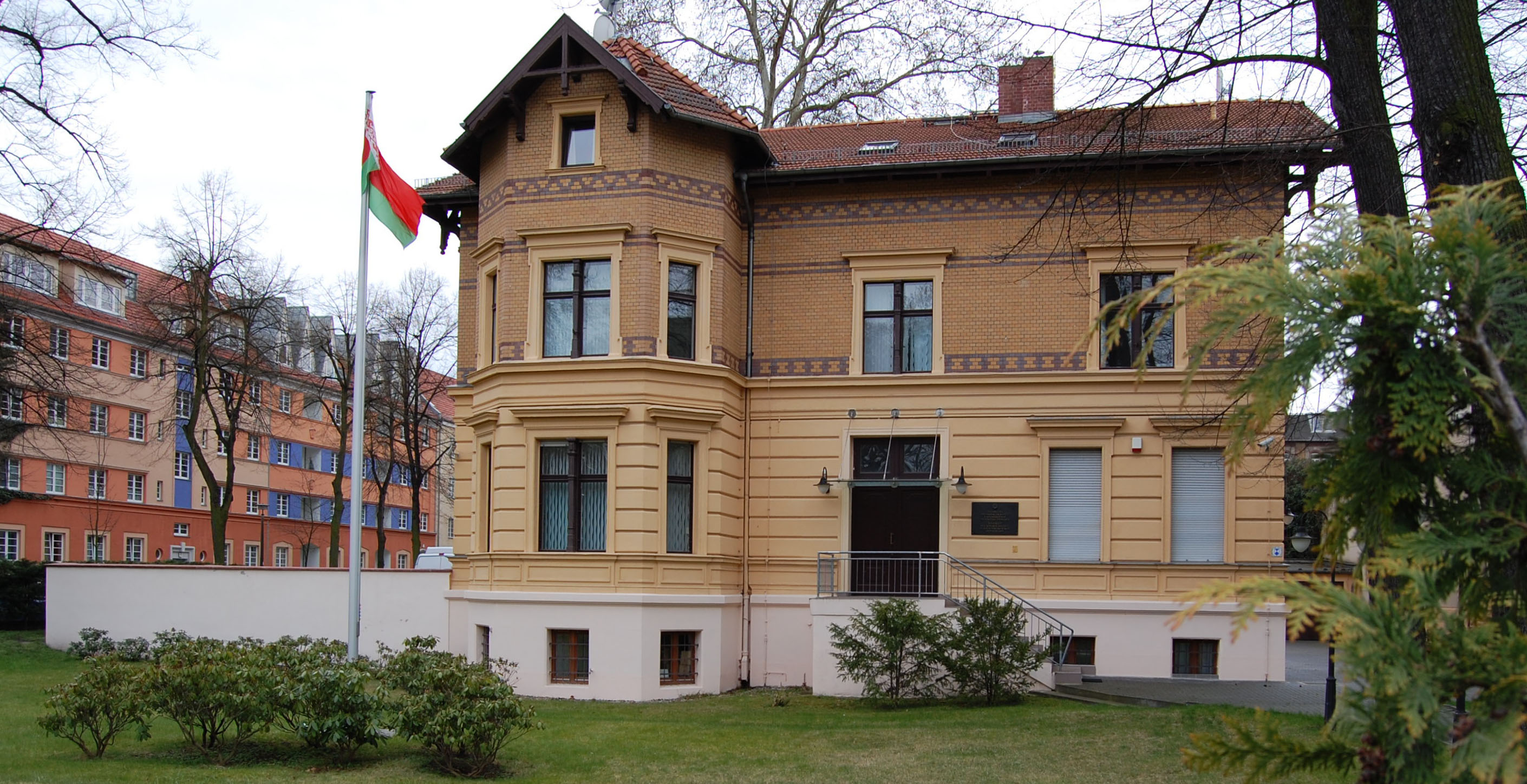
- Location: Berlin, Germany
- Address: Am Treptower Park 32, 12435 Berlin
- Coordinates: 52°29′13″N 13°27′49″E
- Opened: 1994
- Relocated: 1996
- Website: Official website

The Embassy of Belarus in Berlin (German: Botschaft der Republik Belarus in der Bundesrepublik Deutschland, Belarusian: Пасольства Рэспублікі Беларусь у Федэратыўнай Рэспубліцы Германія) is the diplomatic mission of Belarus to Germany. The most recent Belarusian ambassador to Germany was Dzianis Sidarenka.

== History ==
The short-lived Belarusian Democratic Republic, which declared independence in March 1918, has established an extraordinary diplomatic mission in Berlin which was active in 1919 – 1925. Although the republic received no diplomatic recognition by Germany, its representation was officially registered with the German foreign ministry in March 1919. Representatives of the Belarusian Democratic Republic had official contacts with the German government and meetings with the German foreign minister Walter Simons. The mission was actively engaged in helping Belarusian war prisoners, publishing information about Belarus. It was also a coordinating centre for diplomatic missions of the Belarusian Democratic Republic in several other countries. The diplomatic mission was located at Motzstrasse 21, apt. 30, and the Belarusian Press Bureau (Weißruthenisches Pressebüro), affiliated with the diplomatic mission, was located at Kaiser-Allee 209.

In 1923, Germany formally established diplomatic relations with the Soviet-controlled Belarusian Soviet Socialist Republic. However, no effective bilateral relations were conducted and no embassies opened in either Minsk or Berlin at that time.

After the restoration of the independence of Belarus following the collapse of the Soviet Union, the diplomatic relations with Germany were officially restored in 1992 with reference to the diplomatic relations established in 1923.

The embassy of Belarus in Germany was officially opened in Bonn, Fritz-Schäffer-Straße 20, in 1994 by ambassador Piotra Sadoŭski in the presence of minister Piatro Kraŭčanka and German State Secretary of the Foreign Ministry Dieter Kastrup.

In 1996, the embassy was relocated to Berlin following the city’s restoration as the German capital.

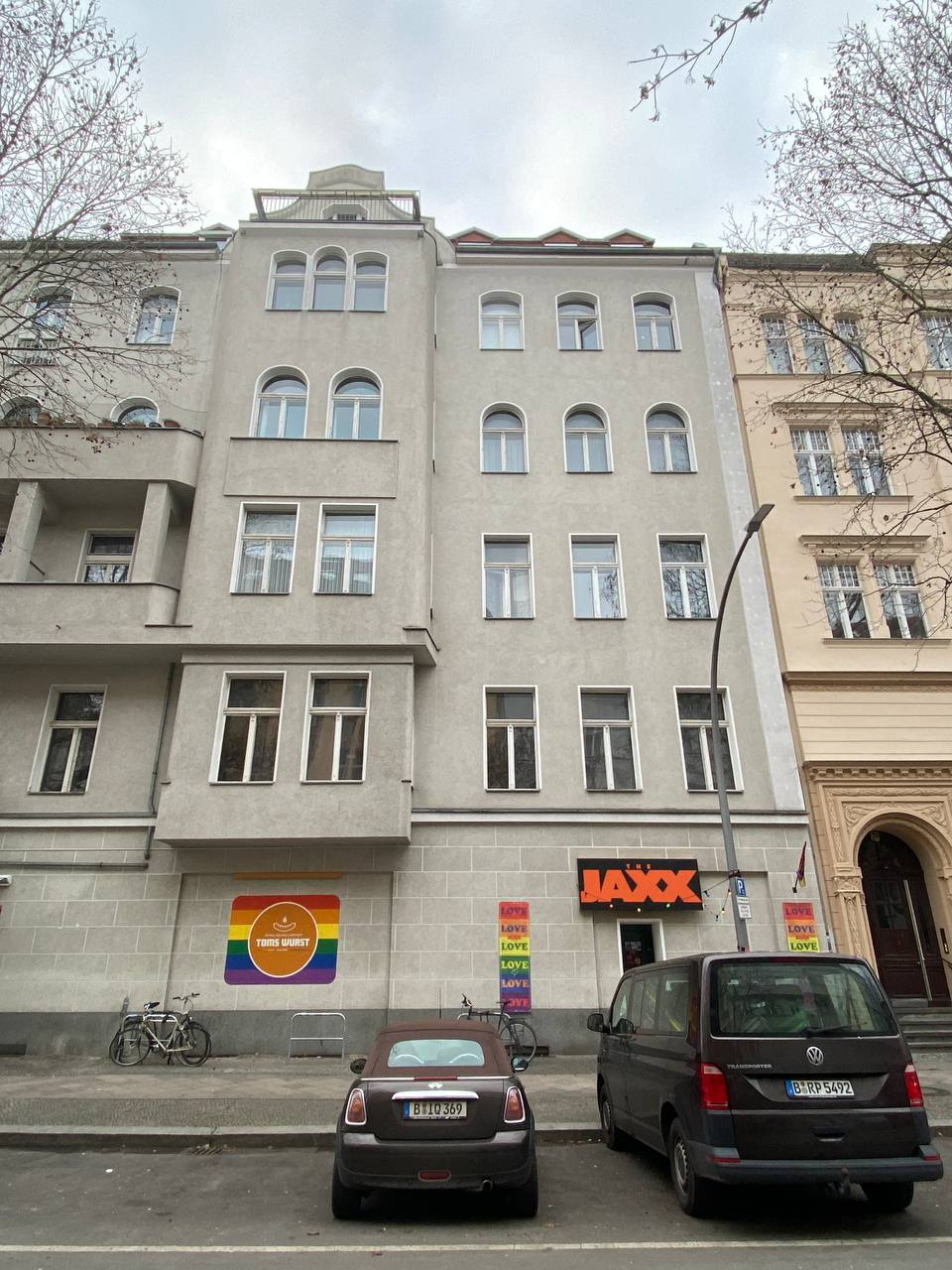
Berlin, Motzstrasse 21, former location of the diplomatic mission of the Belarusian Democratic Republic to Germany in the early 1920s

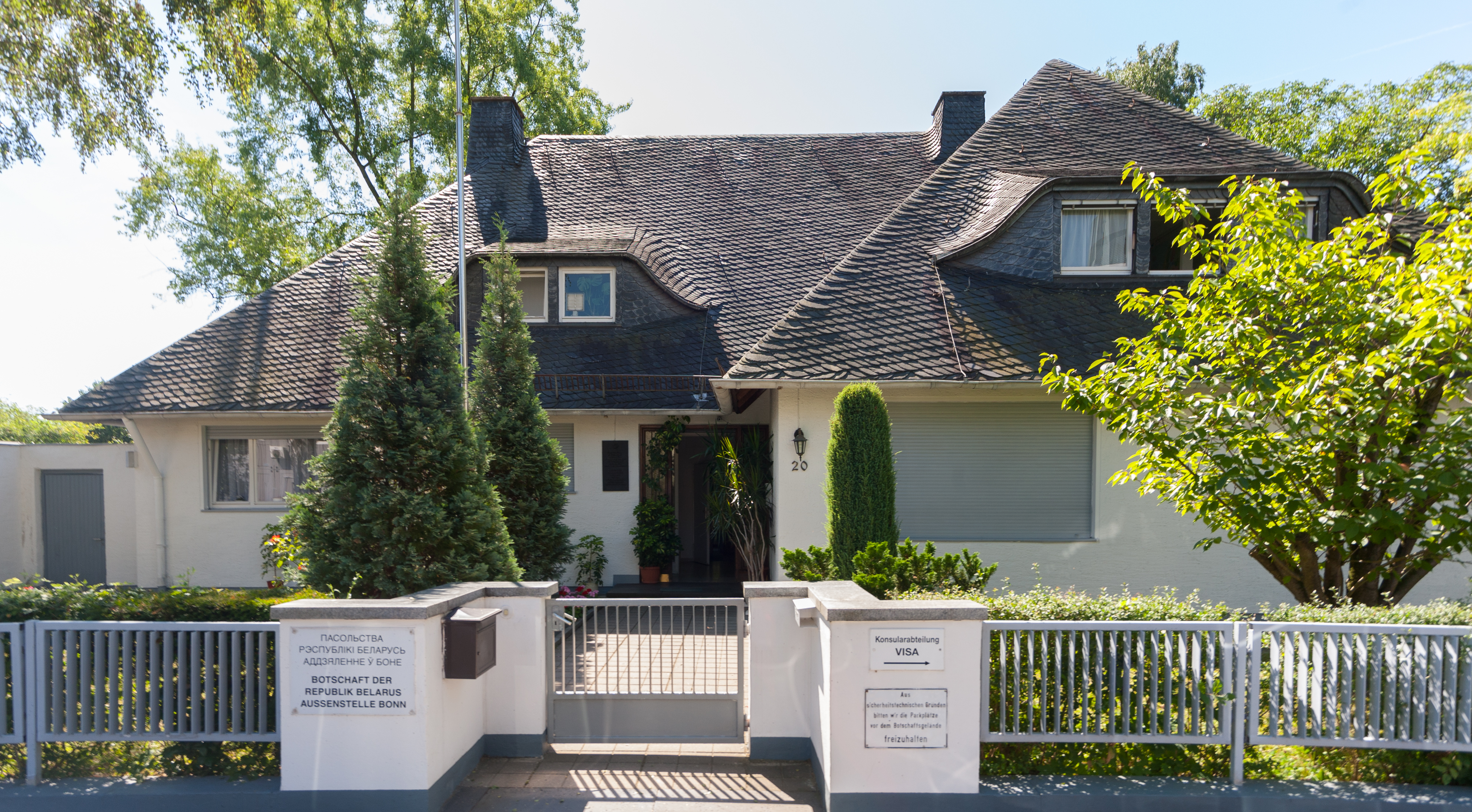
Bonn, Fritz-Schäffer-Strasse 20, first building of the embassy of Belarus to Germany in the 1990s and 2000s (demolished in 2015)

== Current buildings ==
The embassy occupies two 19th-century villas. One of these served as a residential building before the Second World War and later became a post office in the times of the German Democratic Republic. In December 1996, the building was acquired by the Republic of Belarus.

The second building was known as Villa Luise and was built by architect Paul Höfchen in 1888. The house was mentioned by Theodor Fontane in his Wanderungen durch die Mark Brandenburg.

== Ambassadors ==
=== Belarusian Democratic Republic (heads of the extraordinary diplomatic mission) ===
- Arkadź Smolič (May – August 1919)
- Lavon Zajac (August – October 1919)
- Leanid Barkoŭ (October 1919 – 1921)
- Andrej Baroŭski (1921 – 1925)

=== Republic of Belarus (ambassadors) ===
- Piotra Sadoŭski (1992 – 1994)
- Piotr Bialiayeu (1995 – 1998)
- Uladzimir Skvartsou (1999 – 2009)
- Andrej Hiro (2009 – 2015)
- Dzianis Sidarenka (2016 – 2024)

== Links ==
- Official website
- Адкрыцьцё амбасады Рэспублікі Беларусь у Нямеччыне, 1994 г. (Відэа) [Opening ceremony of the embassy of Belarus in Germany, 1994 (video)] - Official website of the Rada of the Belarusian Democratic Republic
