= Dzianis Sidarenka =

Belarusian diplomat (1976–2024)

- Дзяніс Сідарэнка
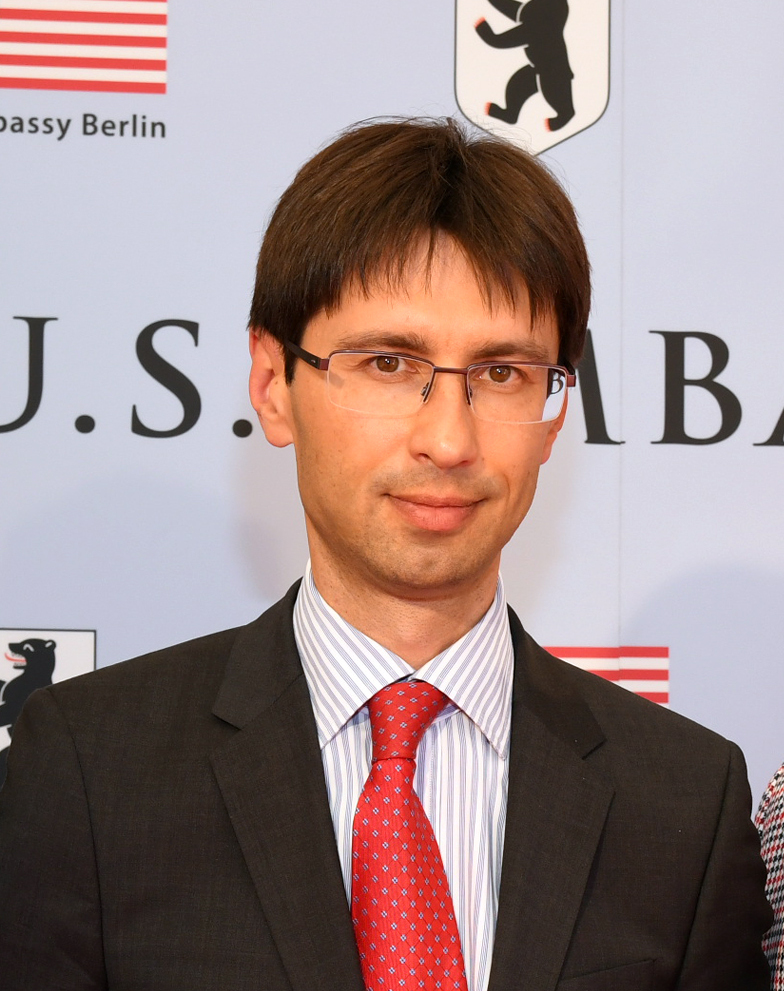
- Sidarenka in 2018

Ambassador of Belarus to Germany
- In office 25 October 2016 – 11 March 2024
- President: Alexander Lukashenko
- Preceded by: Andrey Giro
- Succeeded by: Andrei Strachko

Personal details
- Born: Dzianis Uladzimiravich Sidarenka; 10 March 1976 Minsk, Byelorussian SSR, USSR
- Died: 24 June 2024 (aged 48) Minsk, Belarus
- Children: 2

Dzianis Uladzimiravich Sidarenka (Belarusian: Дзяніс Уладзіміравіч Сідарэнка; 10 March 1976 – 24 June 2024) was a Belarusian diplomat.

== Life ==
From 1996 to 1997, Sidarenka took part in an international programme in political and social sciences at the Paris Institute of Political Studies and left with a diploma. He finished his studies in international relations at the Belarusian State University in Minsk with distinction in 1997.

The next year, Sidarenka joined the Belarusian Foreign Ministry's service and worked for the Pan-European Cooperation section in the Department for Europe. In 2002, he was acting leader of the Permanent Delegation of the Republic of Belarus at the Organization for Security and Co-operation in Europe (OSCE) in Vienna. He came back to Belarus in 2005 and took over the leadership of the section for the OSCE and the Council of Europe at the Foreign Ministry.

In 2009, Sidarenka went as a minister-counsellor to the Embassy of the Republic of Belarus in Austria. At the same time, he became acting Permanent Representative of the Republic of Belarus at international organizations in Vienna.

In 2013, Sidarenka became the leader at the Foreign Ministry's Department for Pan-European Cooperation. On 13 December 2016, he took over the office of Ambassador of the Republic of Belarus to Germany. According to Pavel Latushko, Sidarenka advocated pro-European viewpoints.

Sidarenka was, by decree from President of Belarus Alexander Lukashenko, stripped of his post as ambassador on 11 March 2024.

=== Personal life ===
Sidarenka was married and father to two daughters. Besides Russian and Belarusian, he spoke English, French and German.

== Death ==
Sidarenka died on 24 June 2024 and was buried two days later. He was 48. According to reports, he had committed suicide after he was interrogated by the State Security Committee of the Republic of Belarus (KGB) upon his return to Belarus. According to information from the Belarusian opposition Internet portal Zerkalo, though, Sidarenka had experienced heavy physical stress in the KGB's lie detector tests. Belarusian exile media have reported that he killed himself by jumping from a highrise in Minsk.

The Belarusian news outlet Nasha Niva quoted unnamed sources who said that "[Sidarenka] did not get out of polygraphs and interrogations," further adding that "It is said in Minsk that all career diplomats returning from the EU are now subject to close operational scrutiny by special services" — that is to say, the KGB.

For her part, Katherine Brucker, the Chargée d’Affaires of the United States Mission, speaking to the OSCE's Permanent Council, said that Sidarenka had died "under circumstances that are unclear and very troubling," and she asserted that there had been "reports" that "his body showed signs of torture." However, no evidence was presented to corroborate these assertions.

The Belarusian Foreign Ministry made an announcement about the diplomat's death only after he had been buried, without naming the cause of death. Western media likened the circumstances of Sidarenka's death by falling out a window to the way in which some earlier critics of Russia and Belarus had died, as well as to Vladimir Makei's likewise surprising death in 2022.

== See also ==
- Suspicious Russia-related deaths since 2022
