= List of diplomatic missions in Belarus =

This article lists diplomatic missions resident in and accredited to the Belarus. The capital city of Minsk hosts 53 embassies.

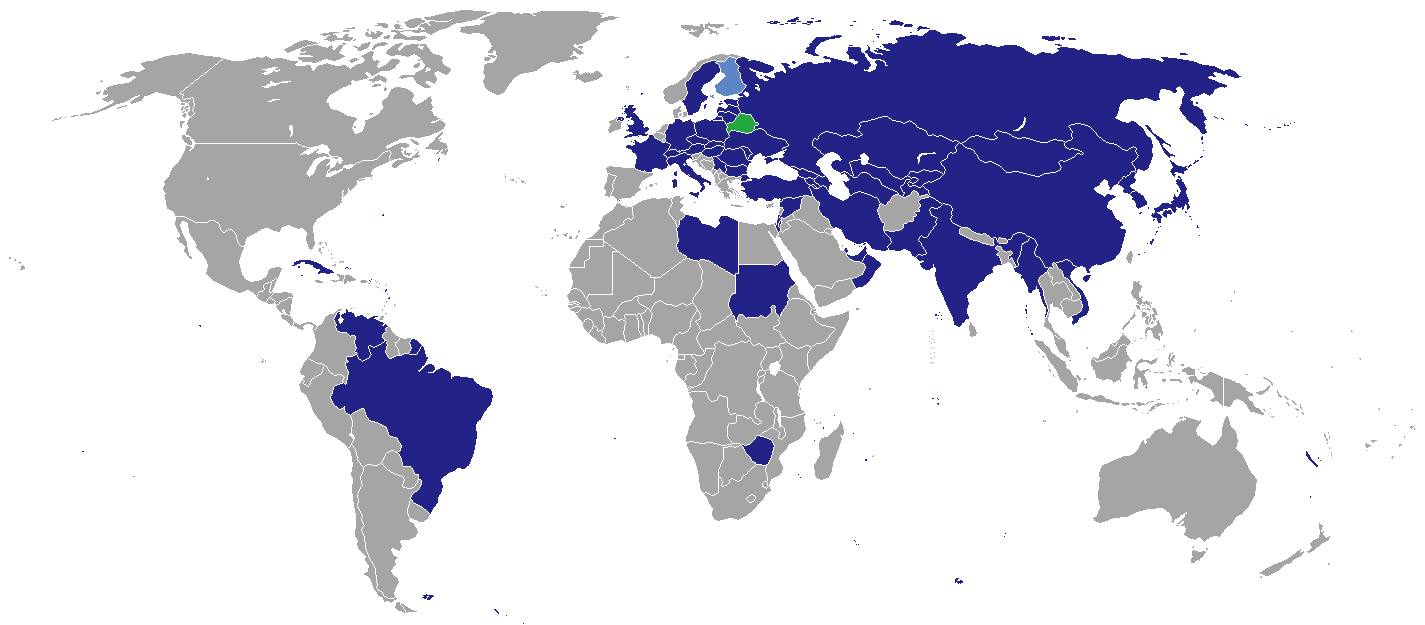
Diplomatic missions in Belarus

== Diplomatic missions in Minsk ==
=== Embassies ===
1. Armenia
2. Austria
3. Azerbaijan
4. Brazil
5. Bulgaria
6. China
7. Cuba
8. Czechia
9. Estonia
10. France
11. Germany
12. Georgia
13. Holy See
14. Hungary
15. India
16. Iran
17. Israel
18. Italy
19. Japan
20. Kazakhstan
21. Kyrgyzstan
22. Latvia
23. Libya
24. Lithuania
25. Moldova
26. Mongolia
27. Myanmar
28. Oman
29. North Korea
30. Pakistan
31. Palestine
32. Poland
33. Qatar
34. Romania
35. Russia
36. Serbia
37. Slovakia
38. South Korea
39. Sovereign Military Order of Malta
40. Sudan
41. Sweden
42. Switzerland
43. Syria
44. Tajikistan
45. Turkey
46. Turkmenistan
47. Ukraine
48. United Arab Emirates
49. United Kingdom
50. Uzbekistan
51. Venezuela
52. Vietnam
53. Zimbabwe

=== Other missions/delegations/offices ===
1. European Union (Delegation)
2. Finland (Liaison office)
3. Netherlands (Embassy office) (Note: Subordinate to the Dutch embassy in Warsaw, Poland.)
4. United Nations (Resident coordinator's office)

=== Gallery of embassies ===
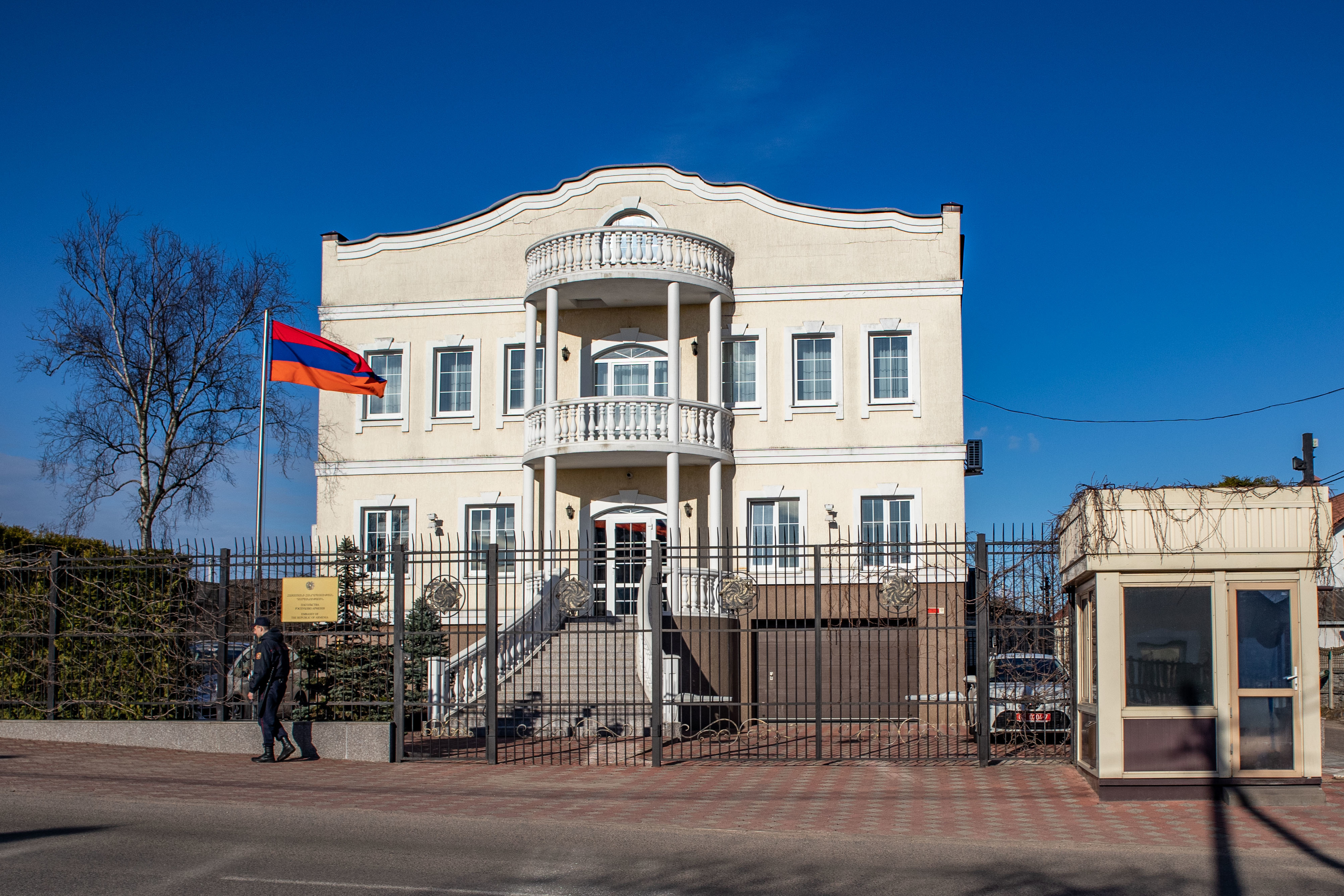
Armenia

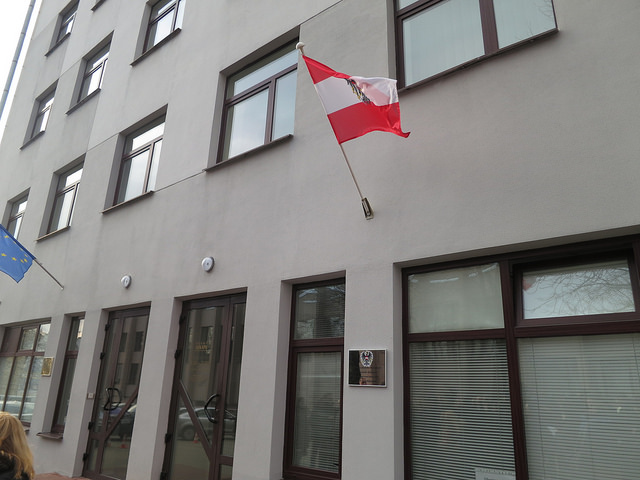
Austria

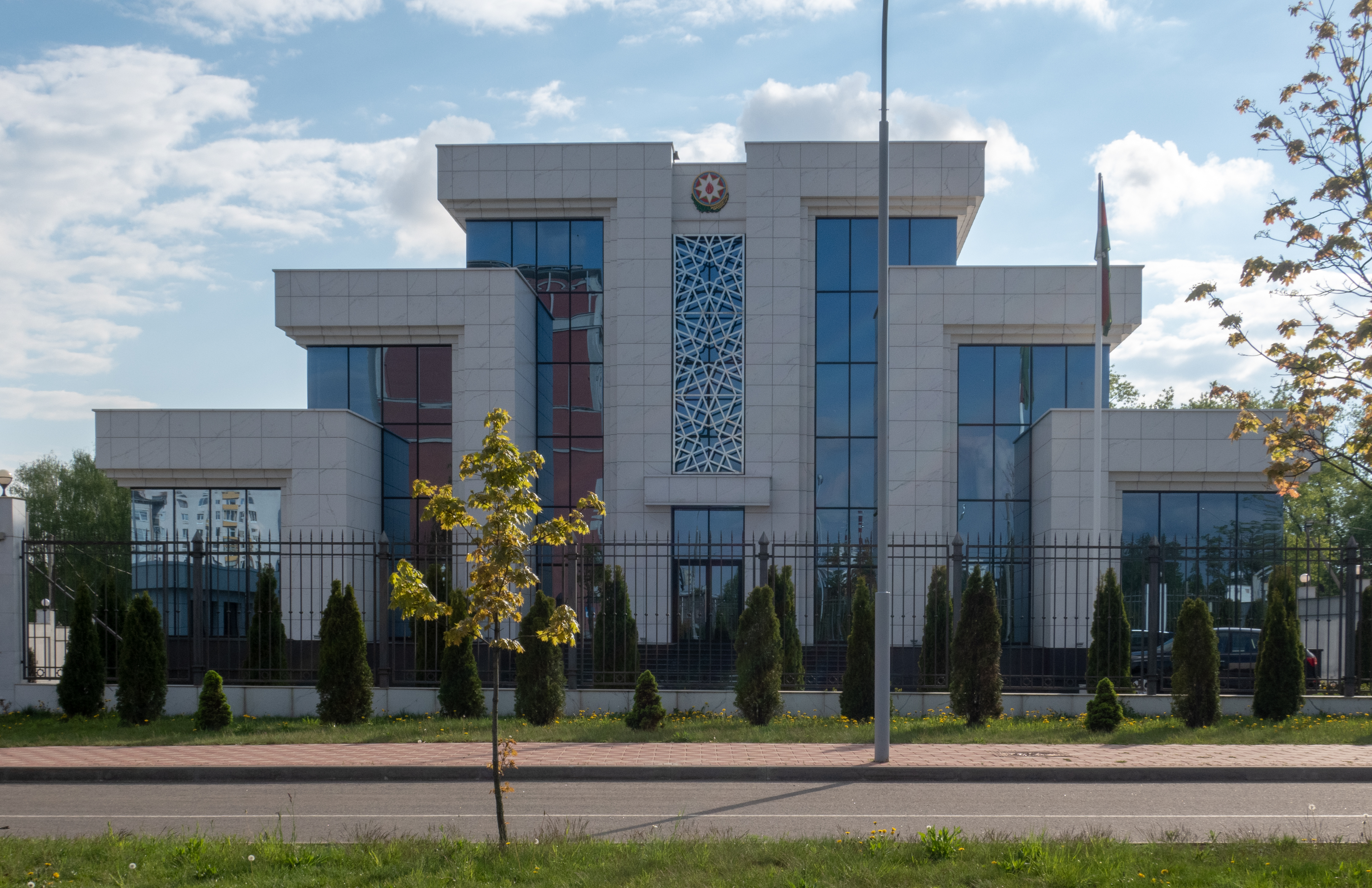
Azerbaijan

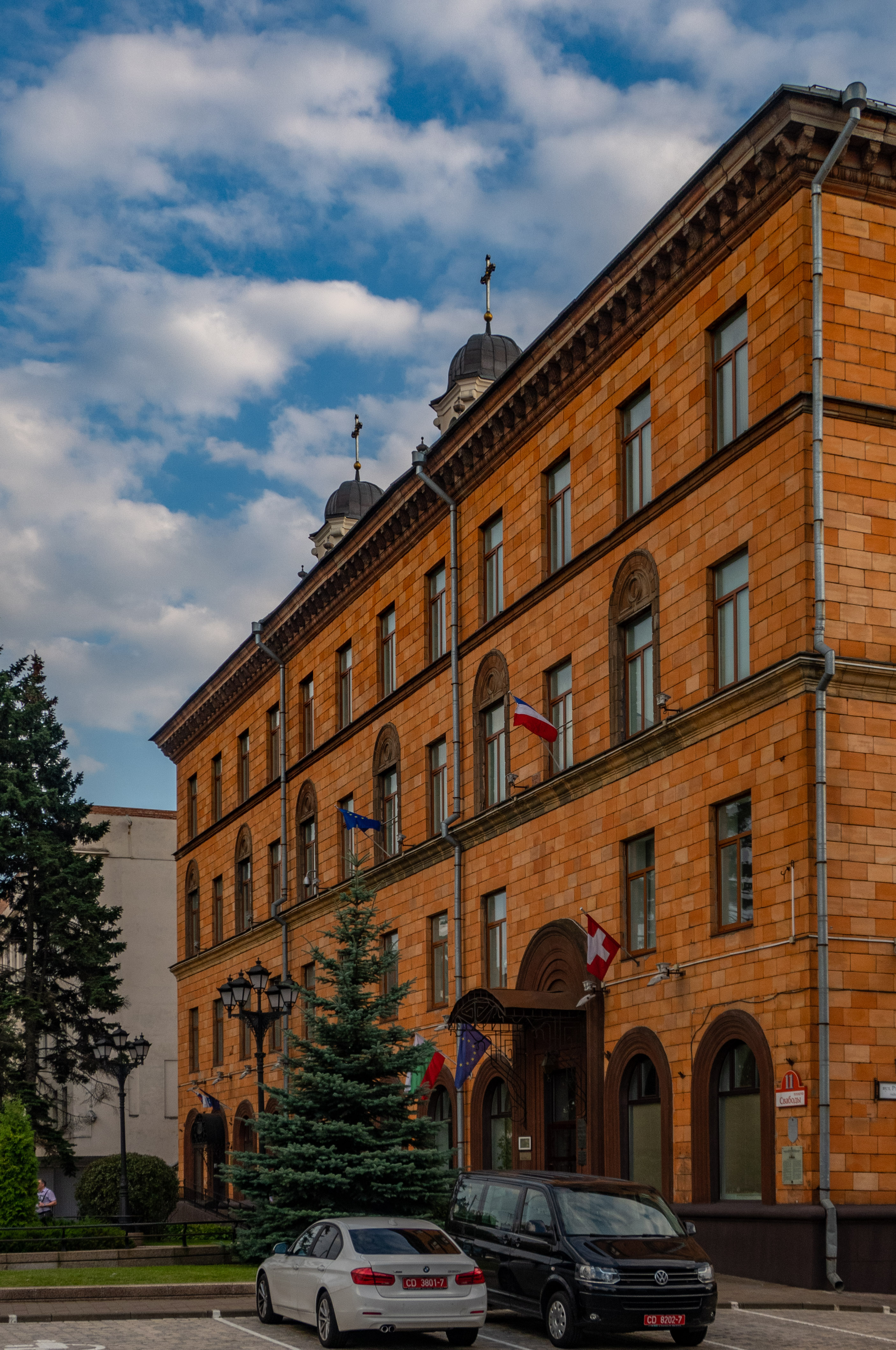
Bulgaria

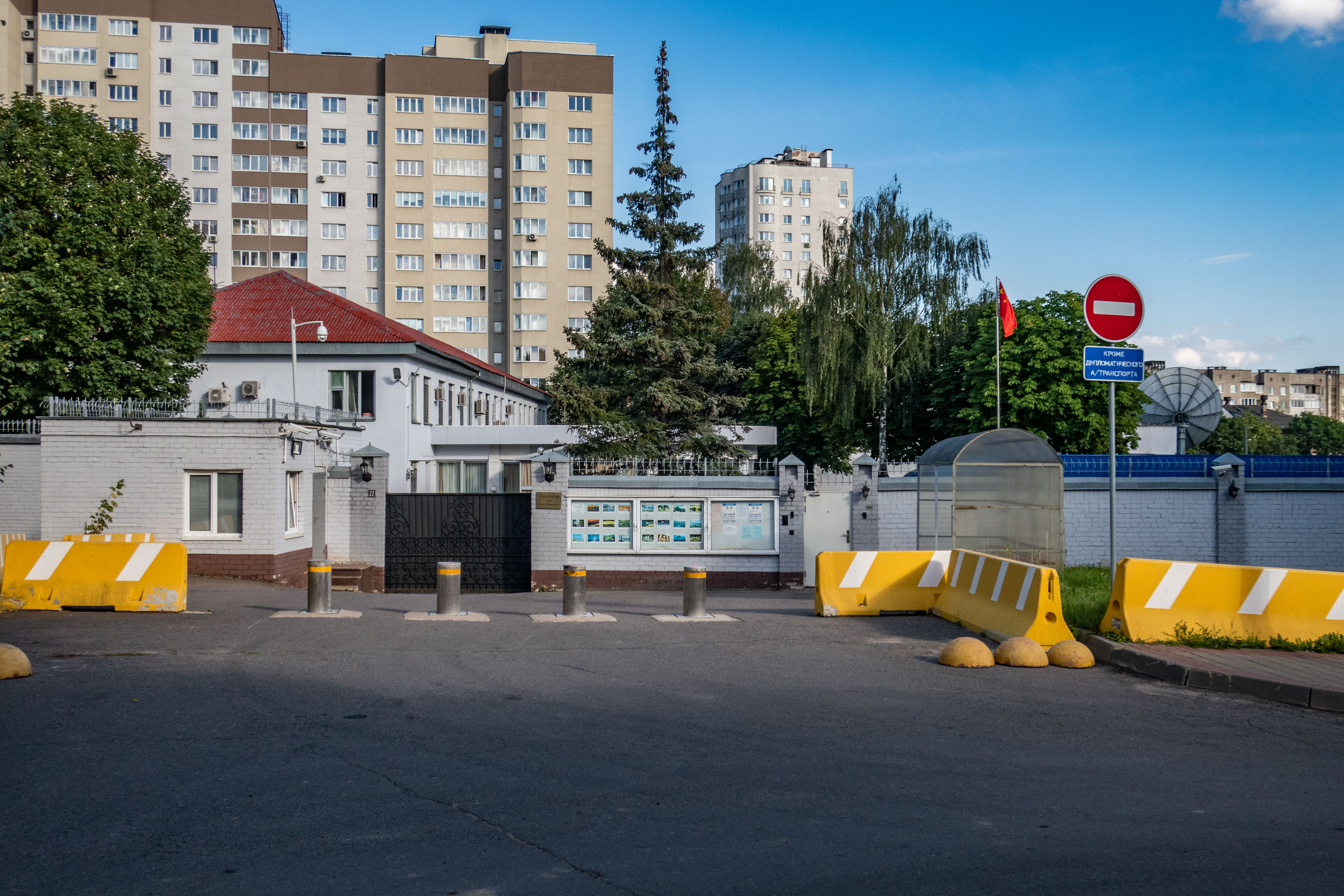
China

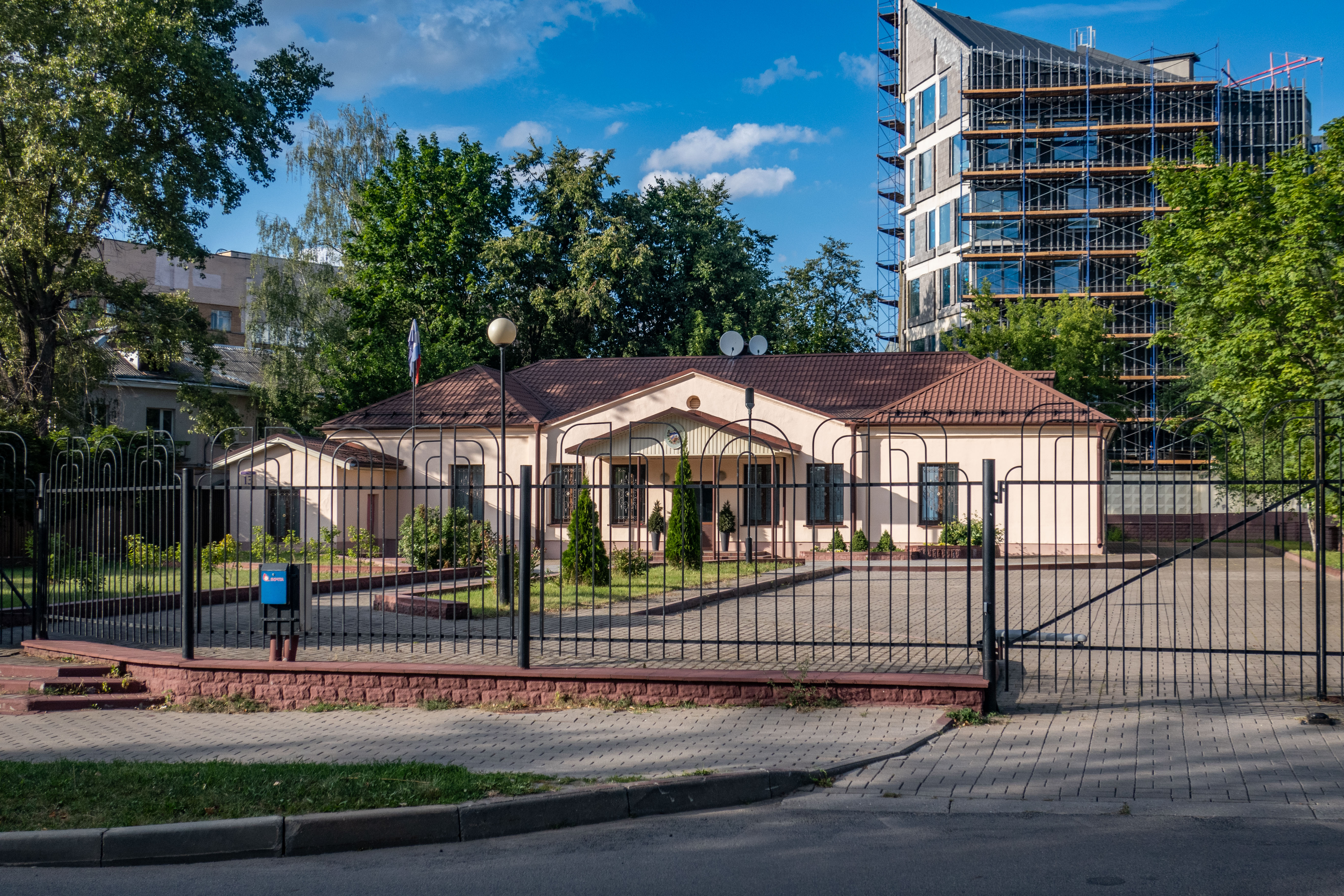
Cuba

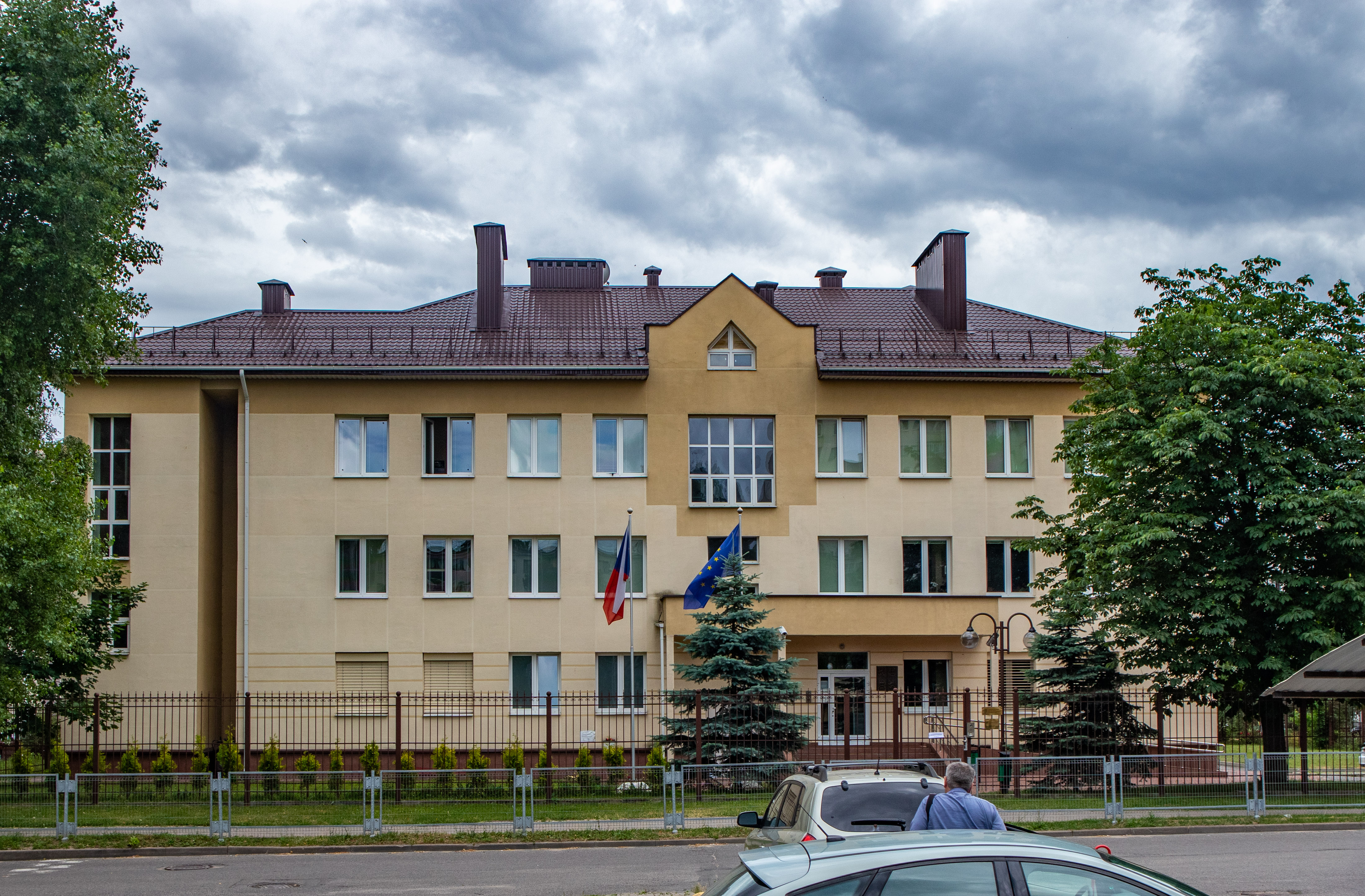
Czechia

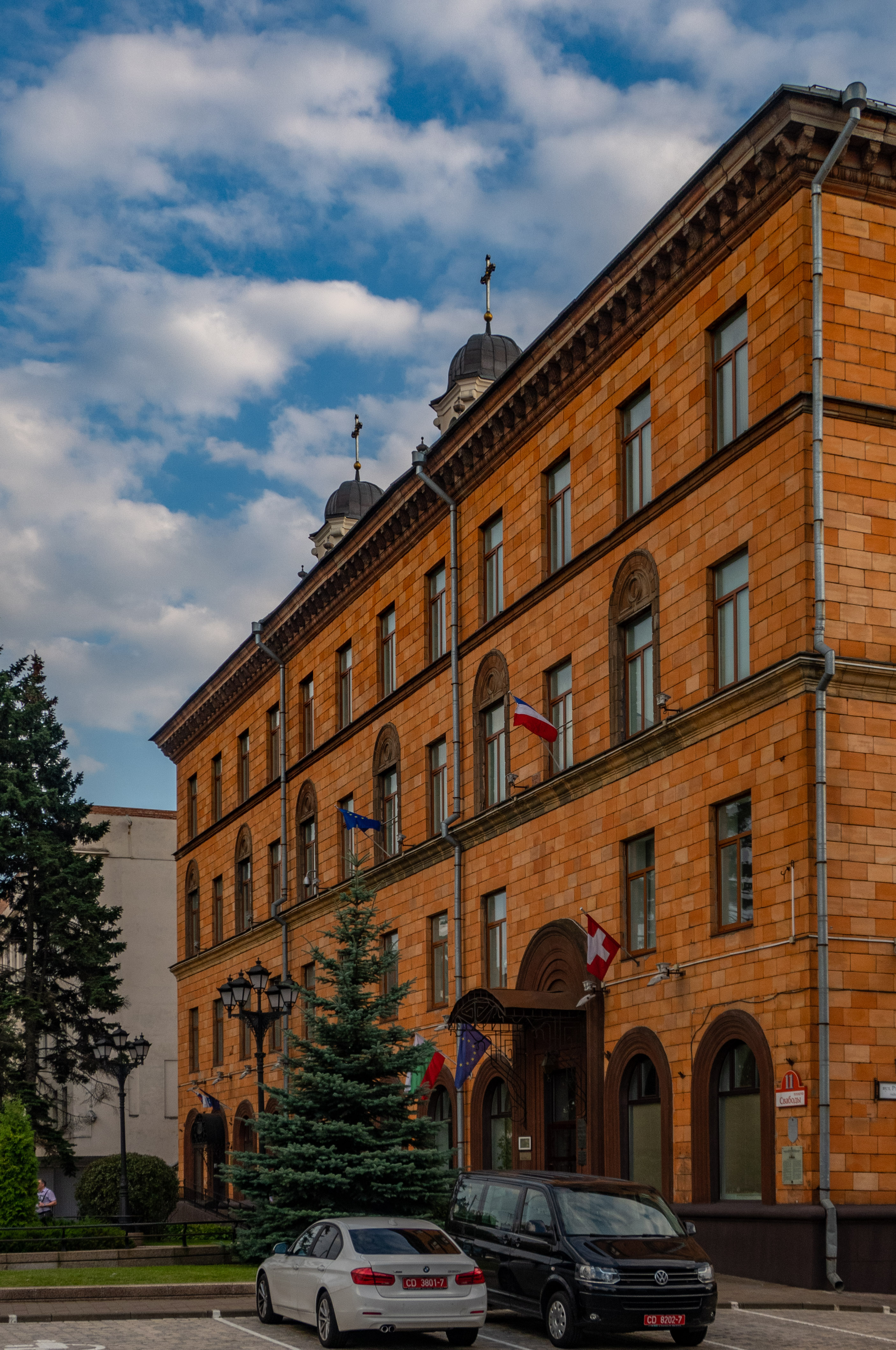
France

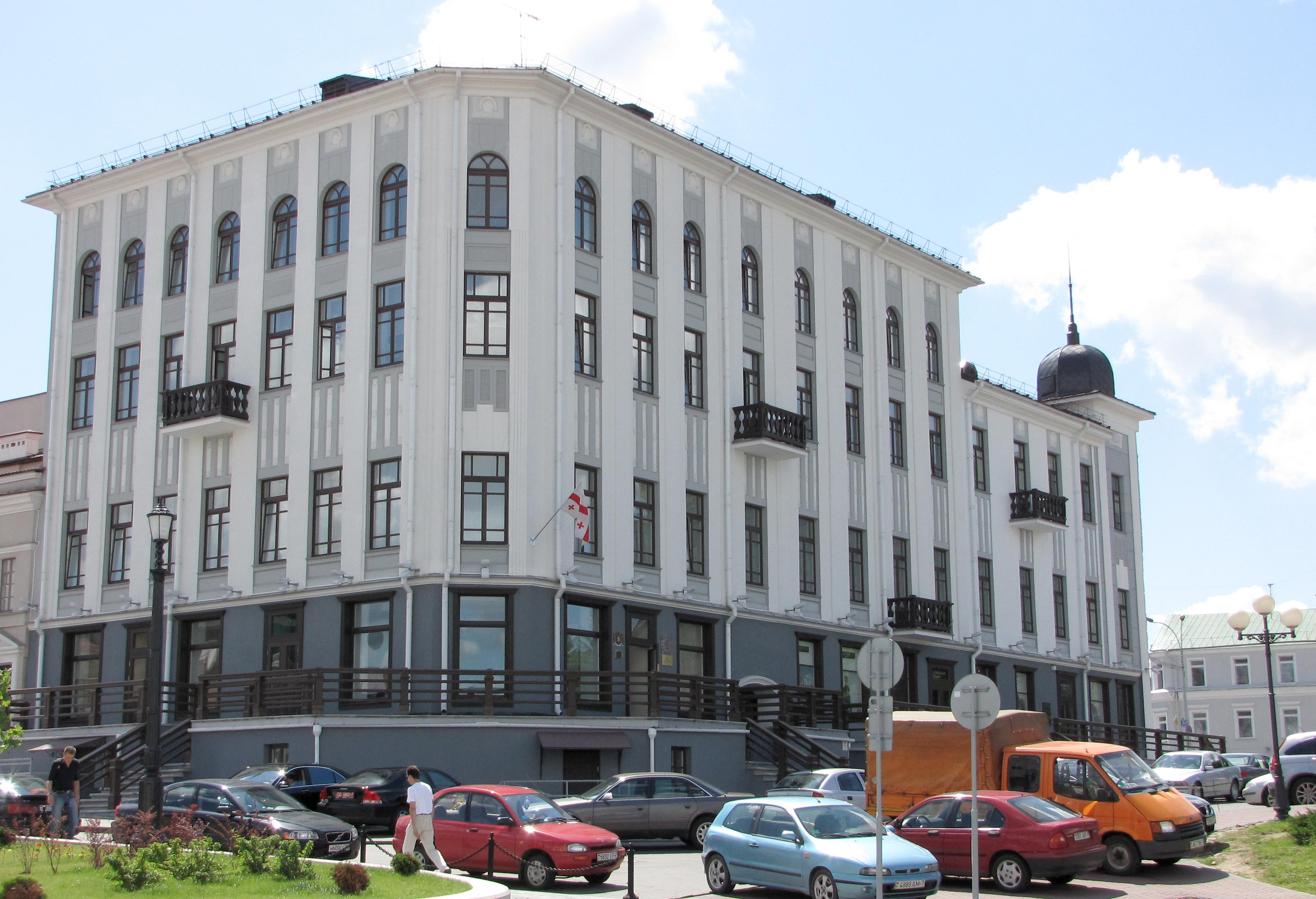
Georgia

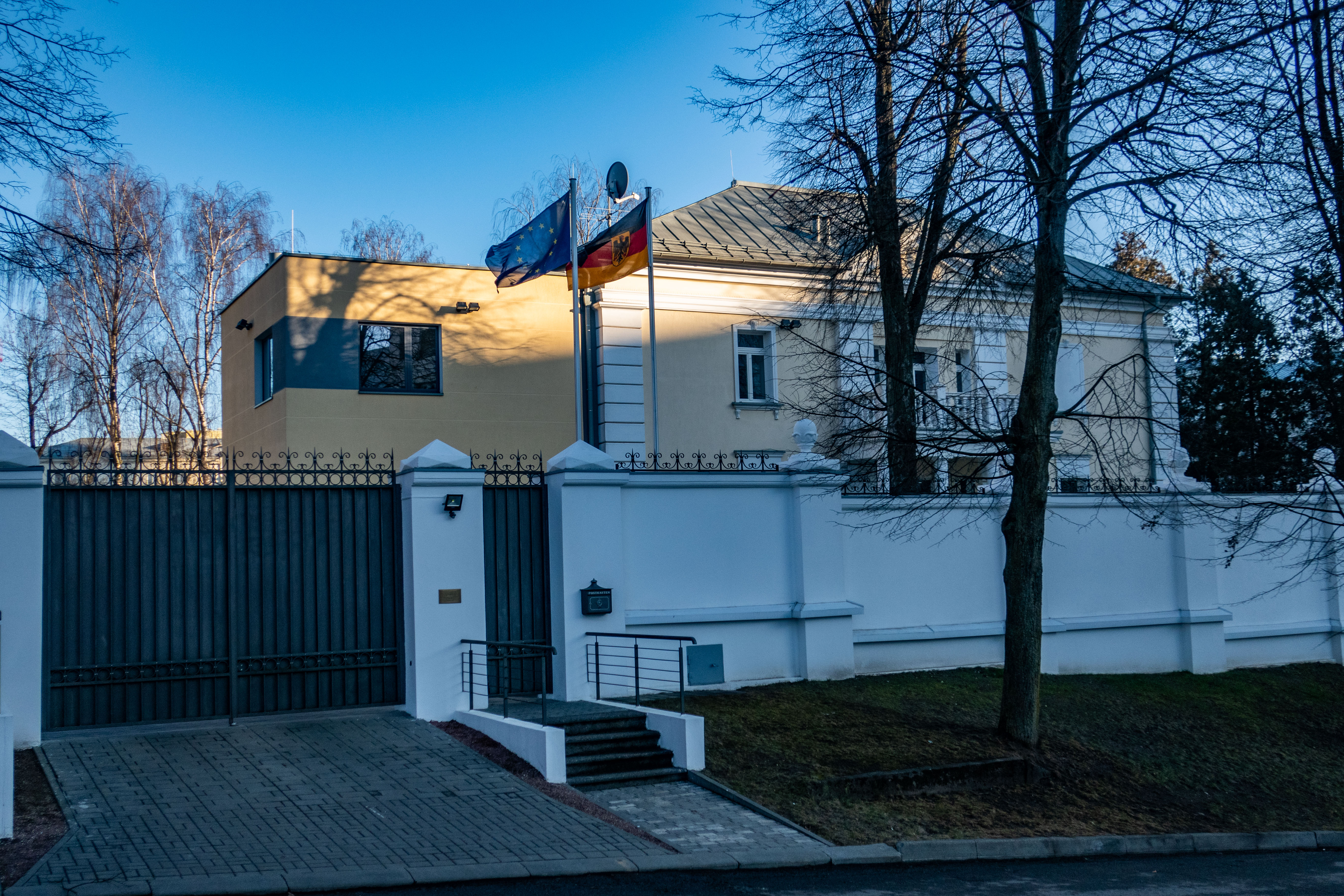
Germany

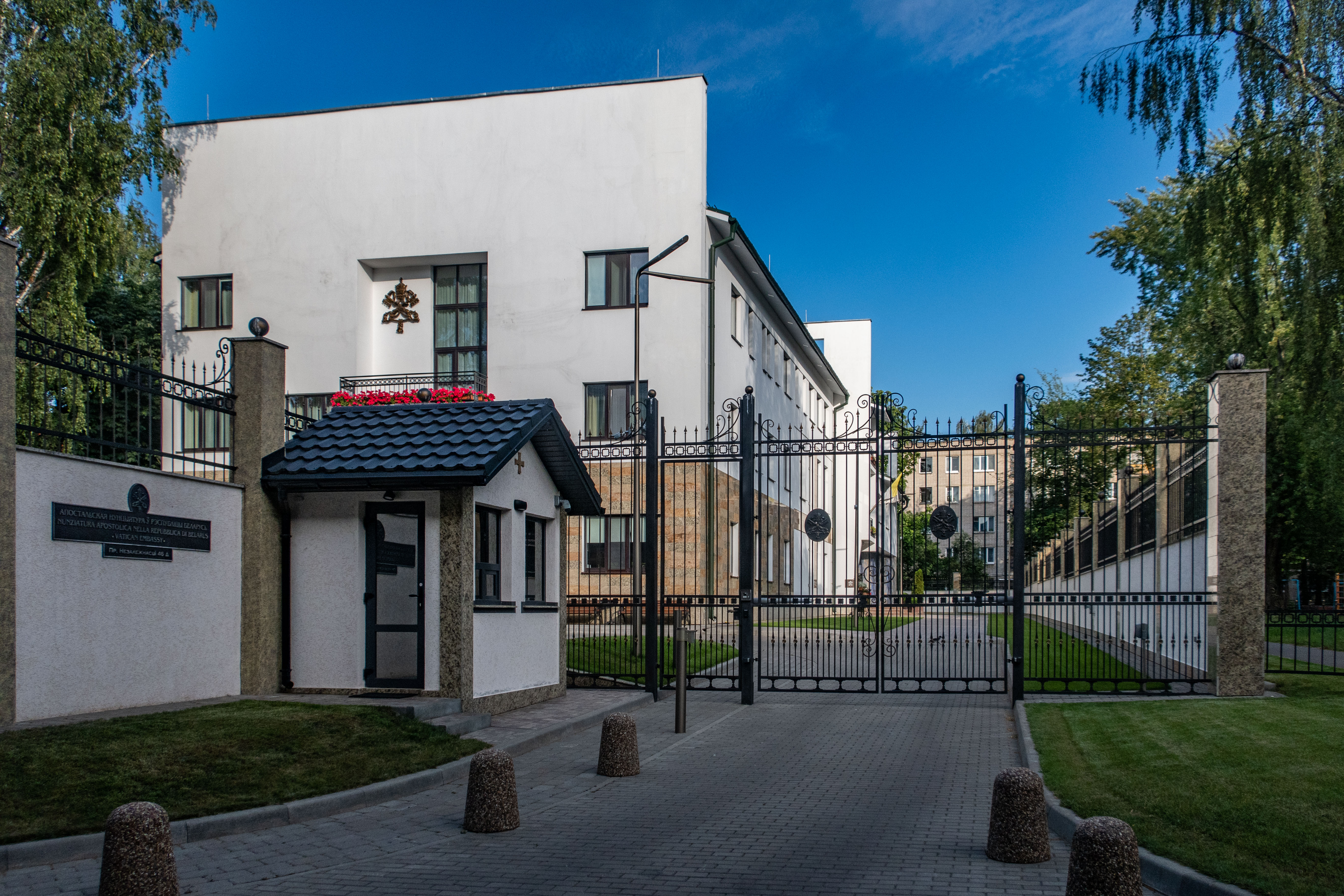
Holy See

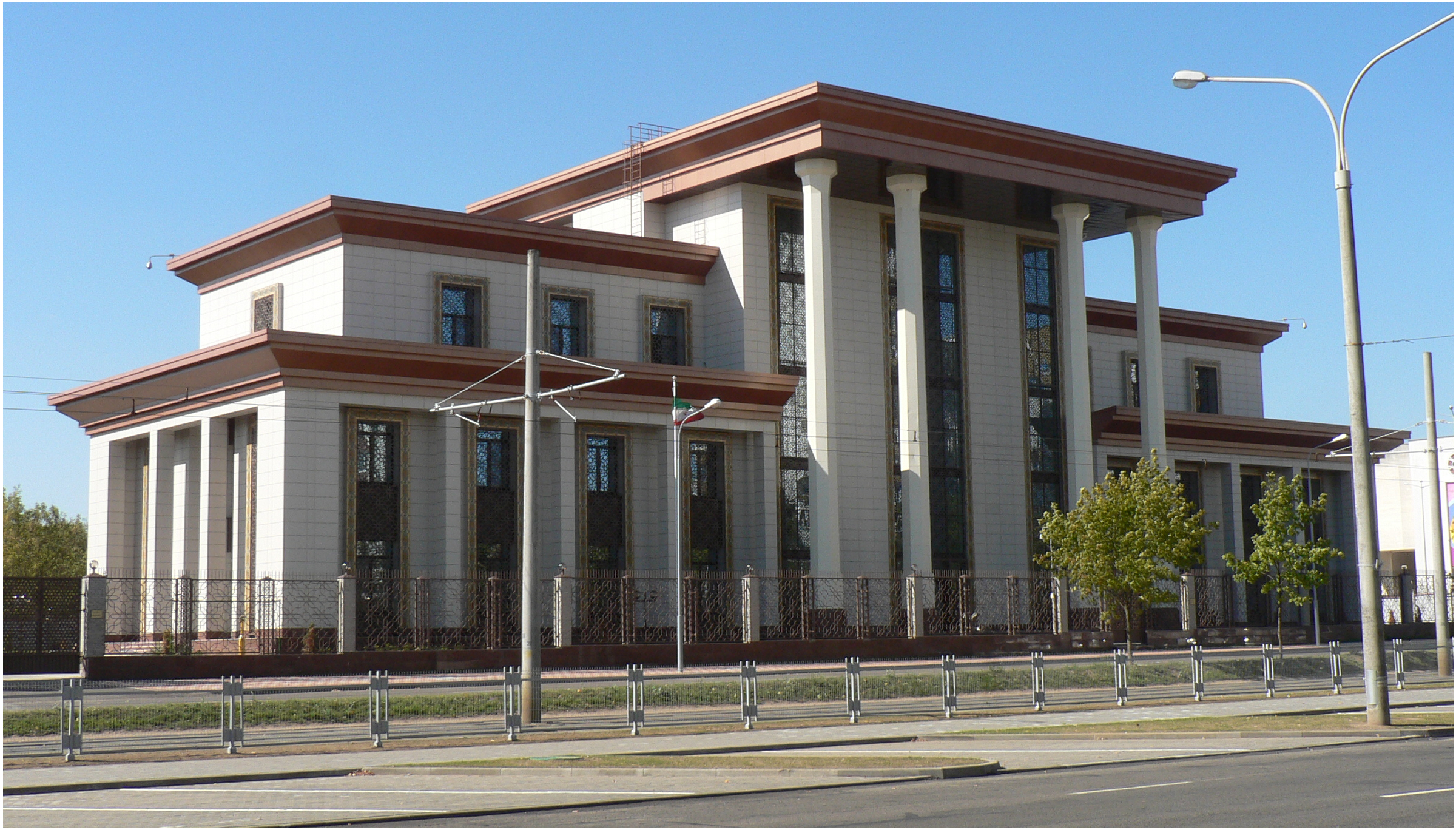
Iran

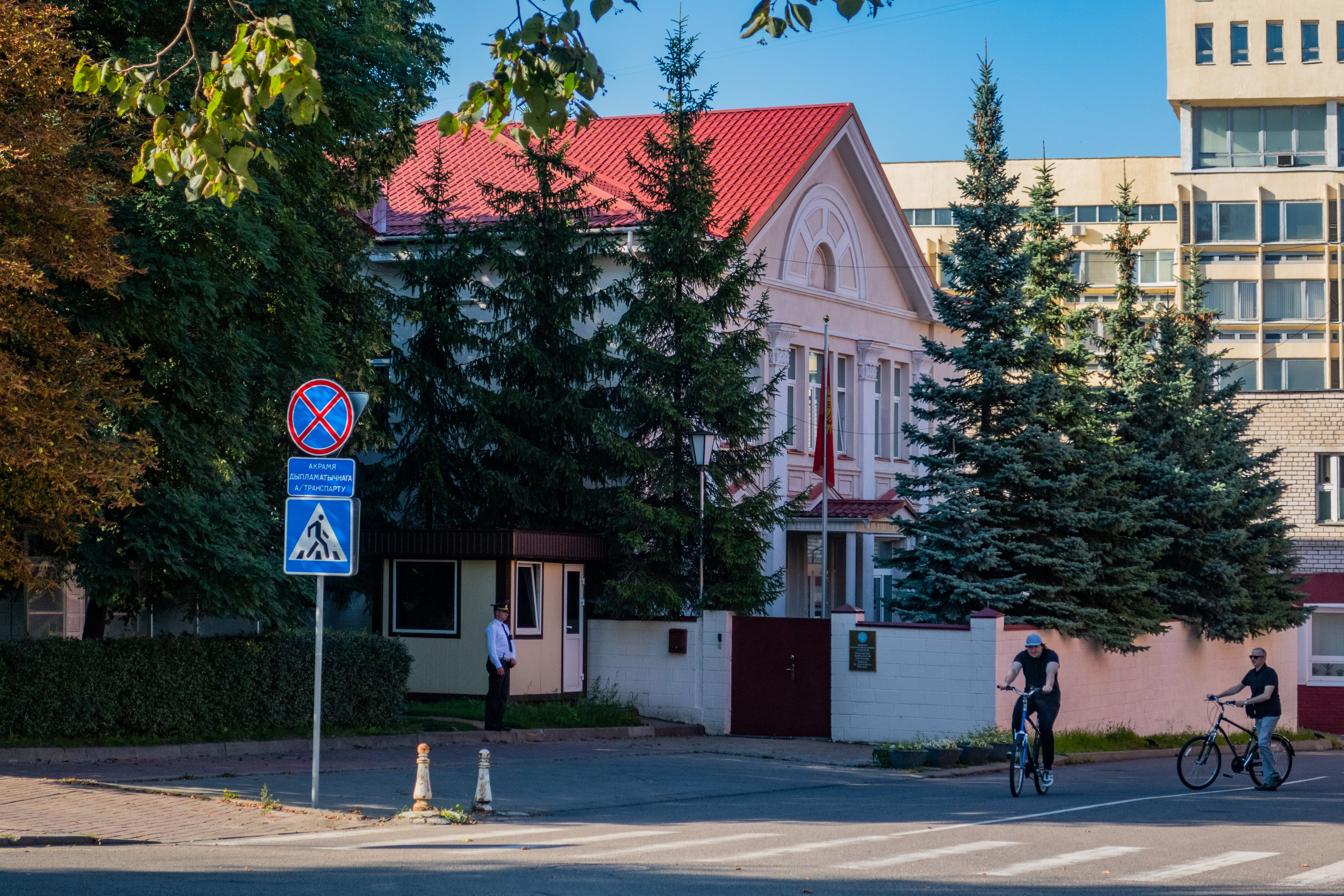
Kyrgyzstan

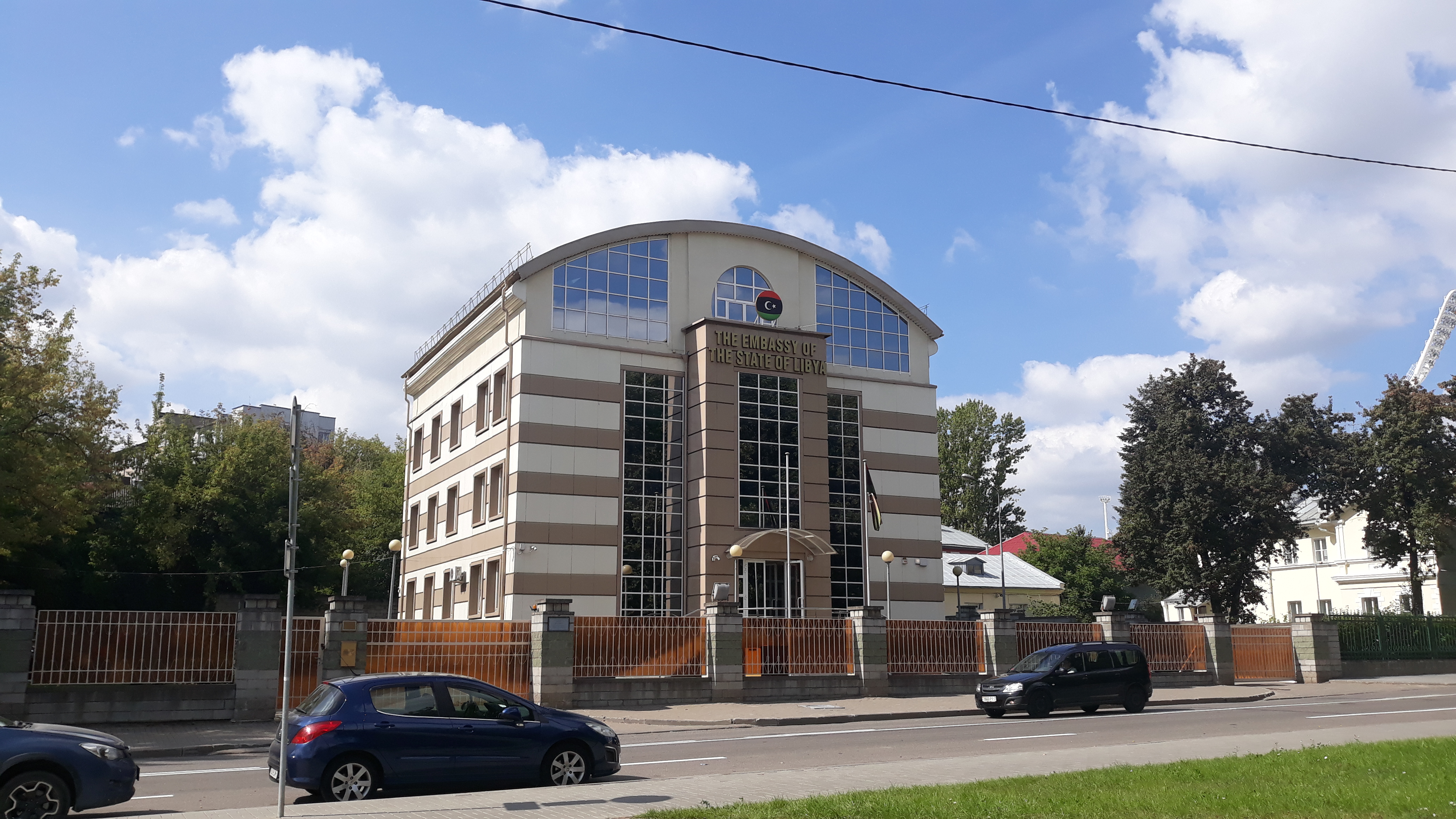
Libya

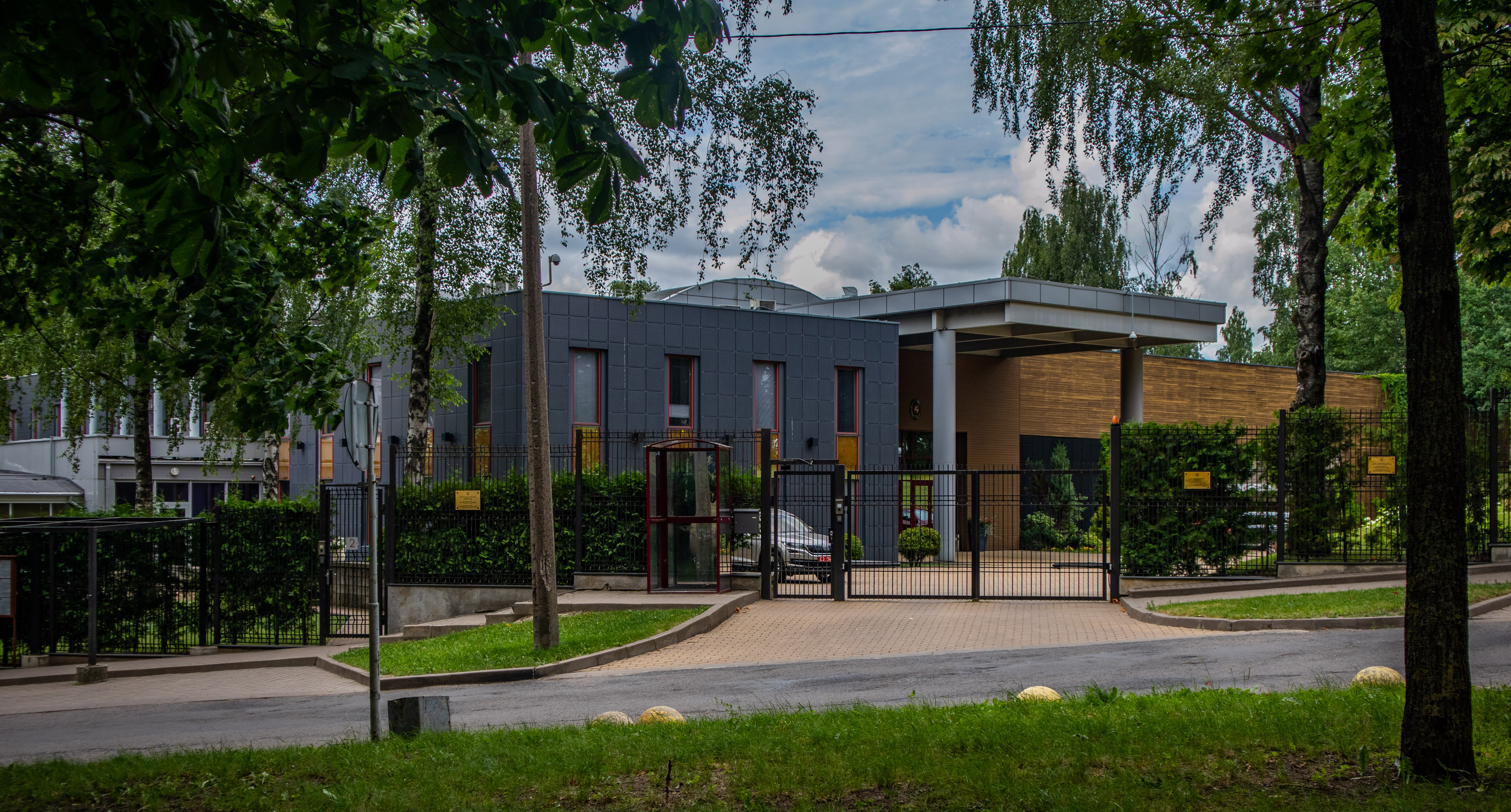
Lithuania

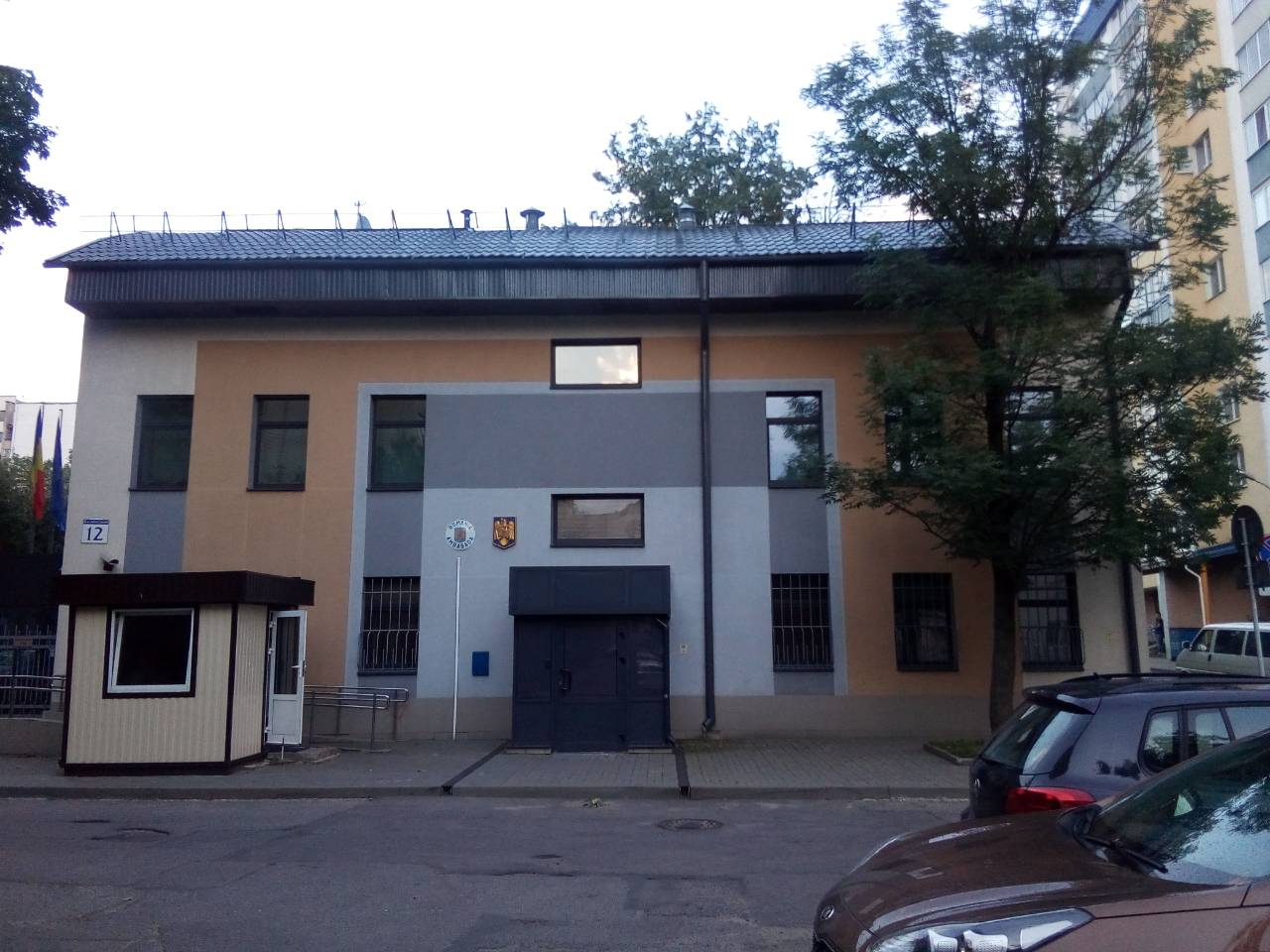
Romania

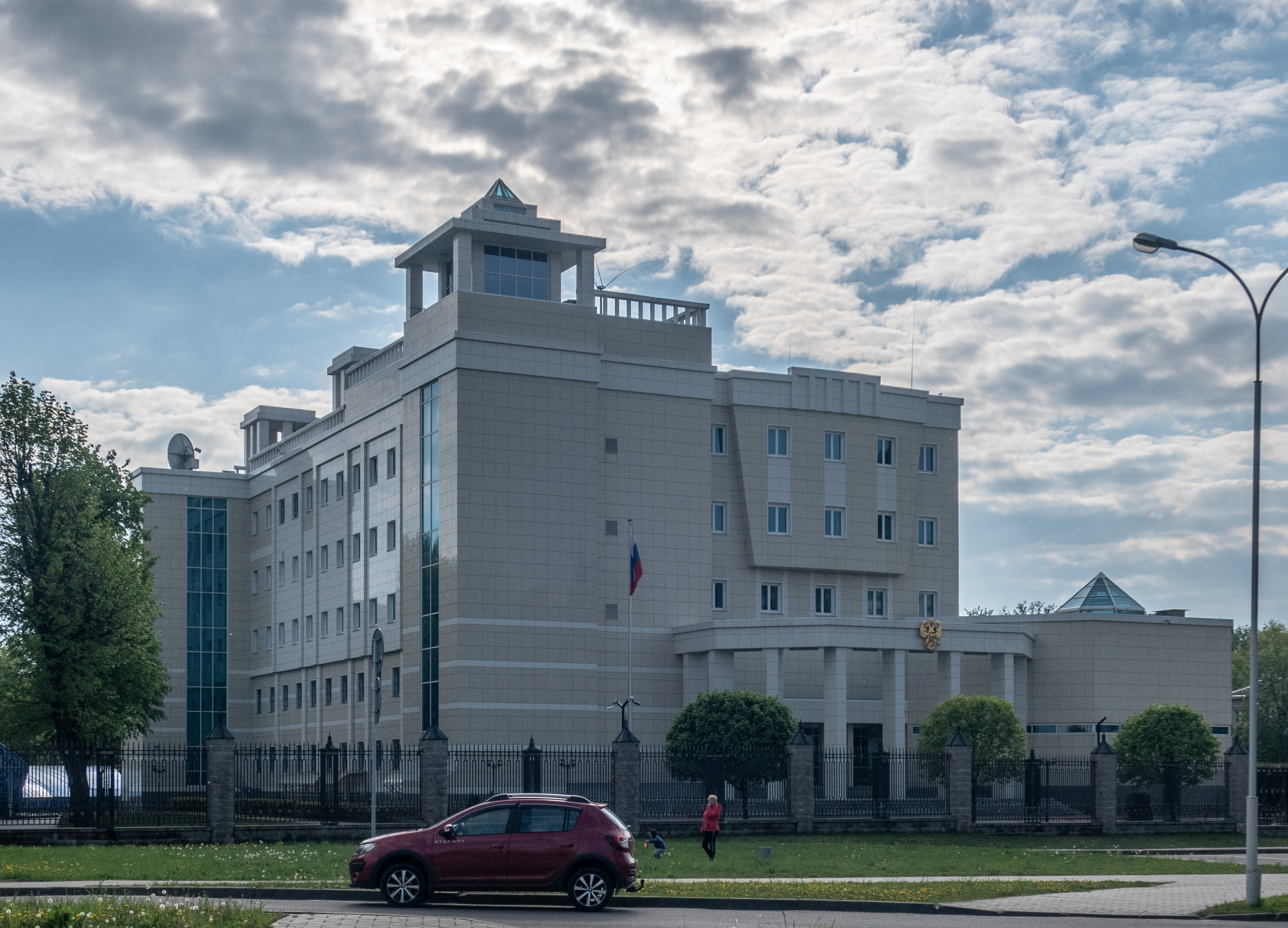
Russia

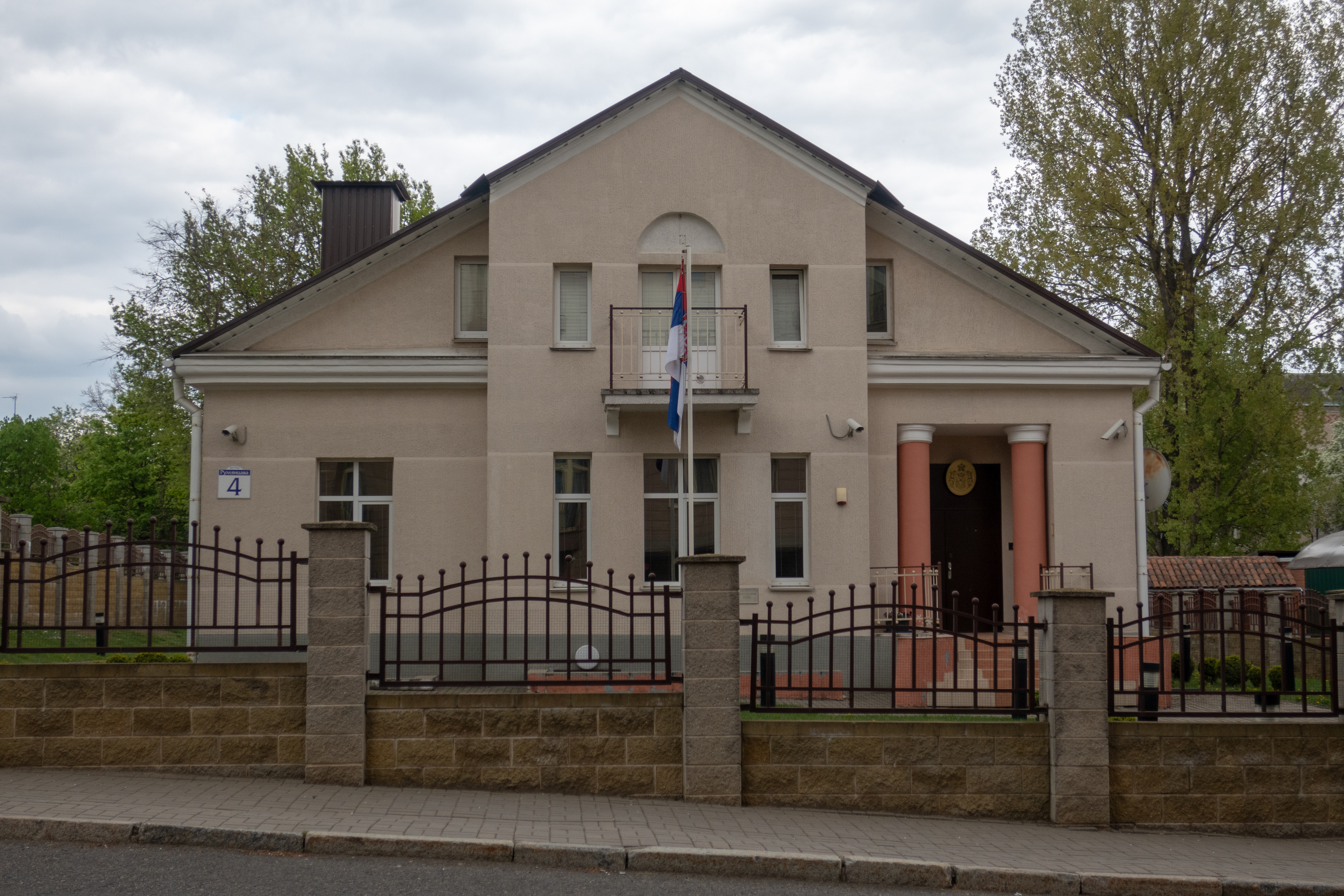
Serbia

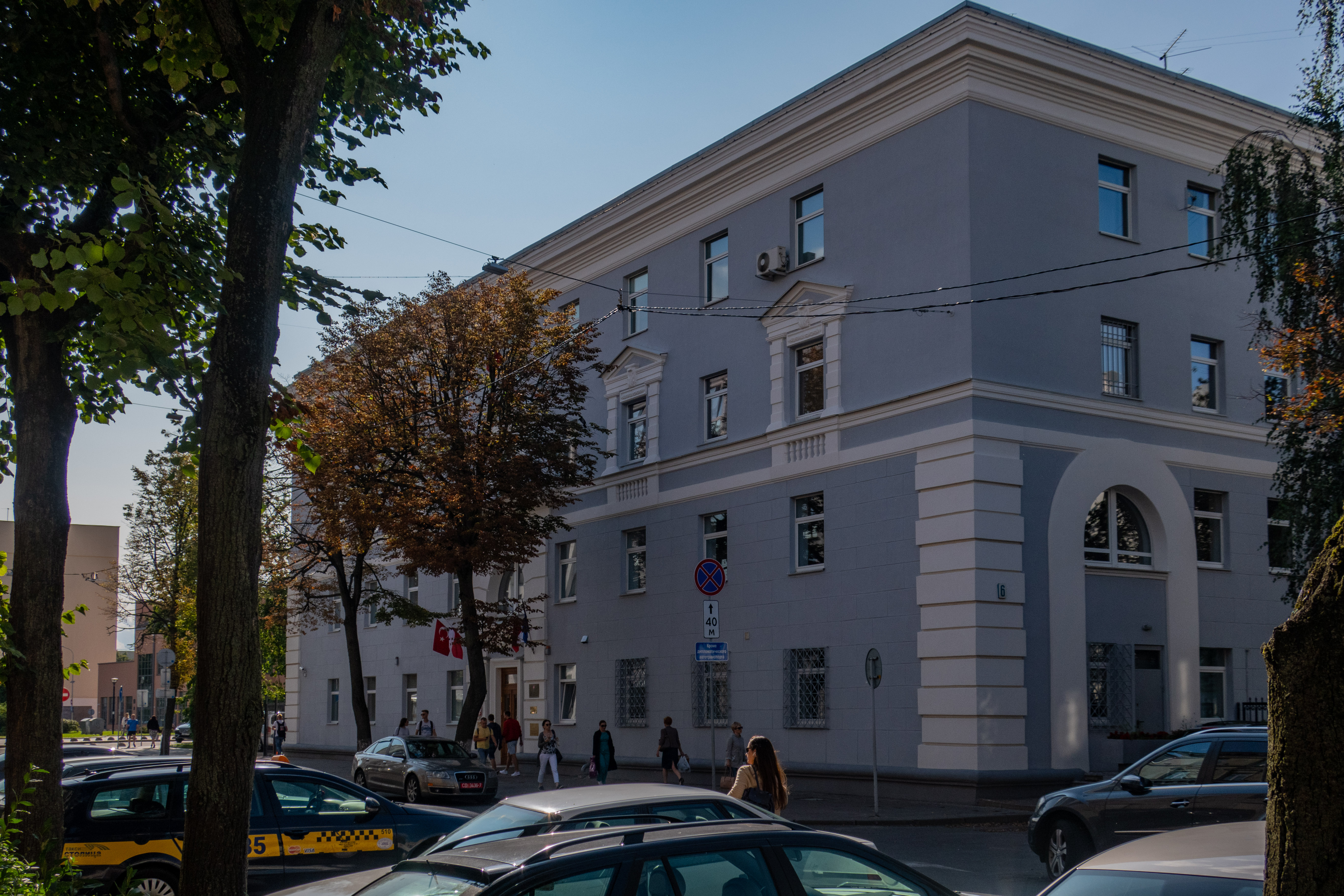
Slovakia

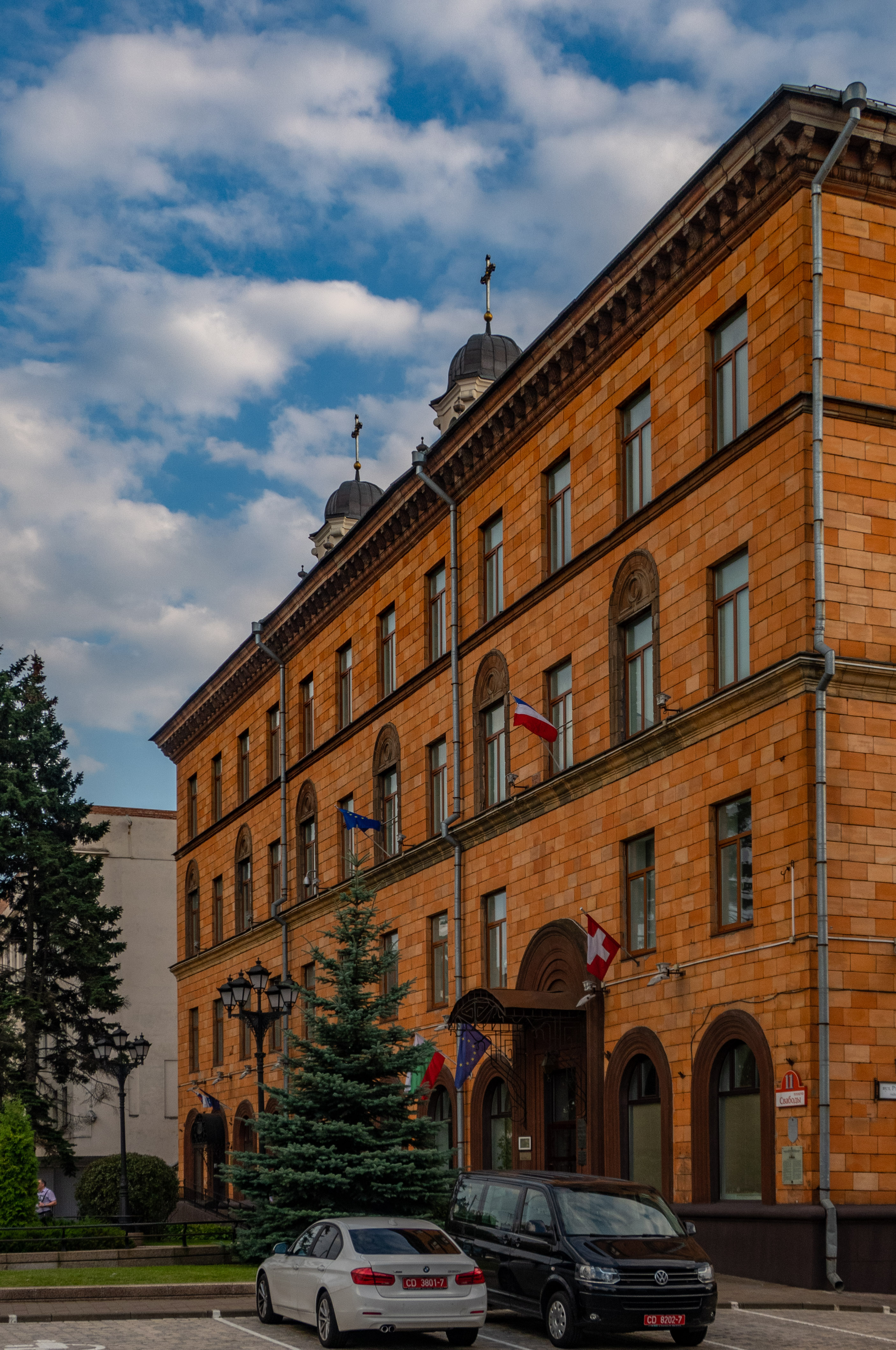
Switzerland

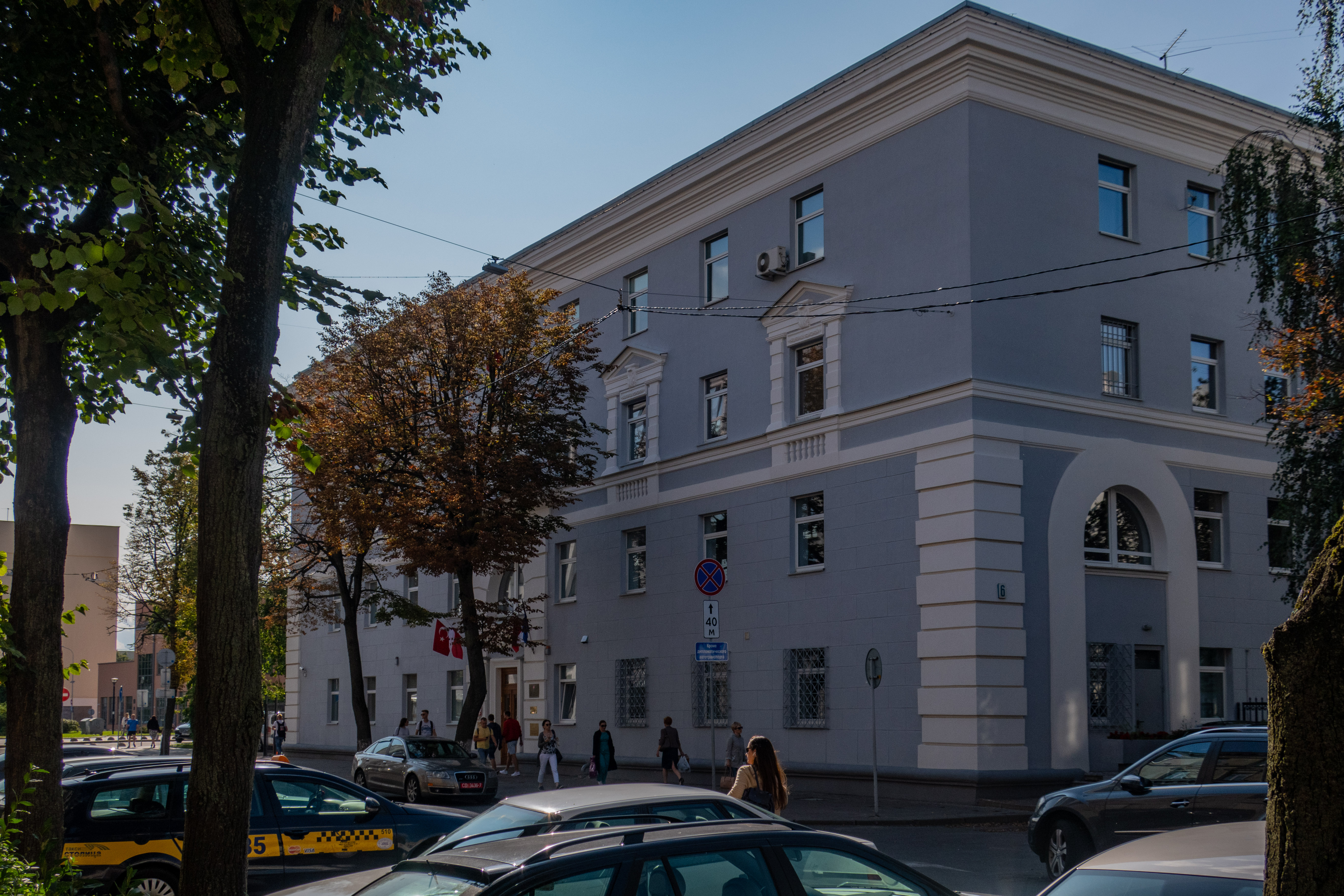
Turkey

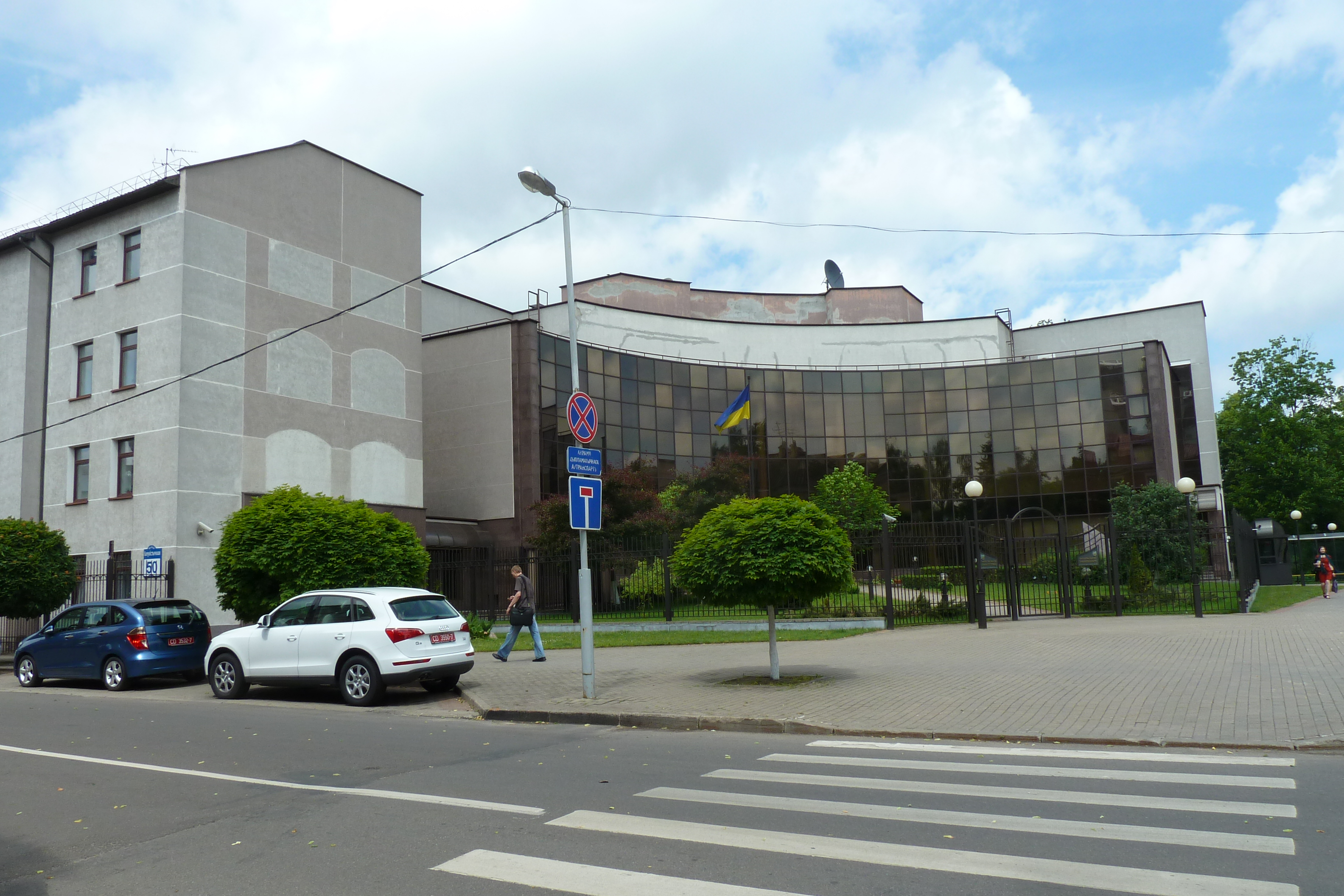
Ukraine

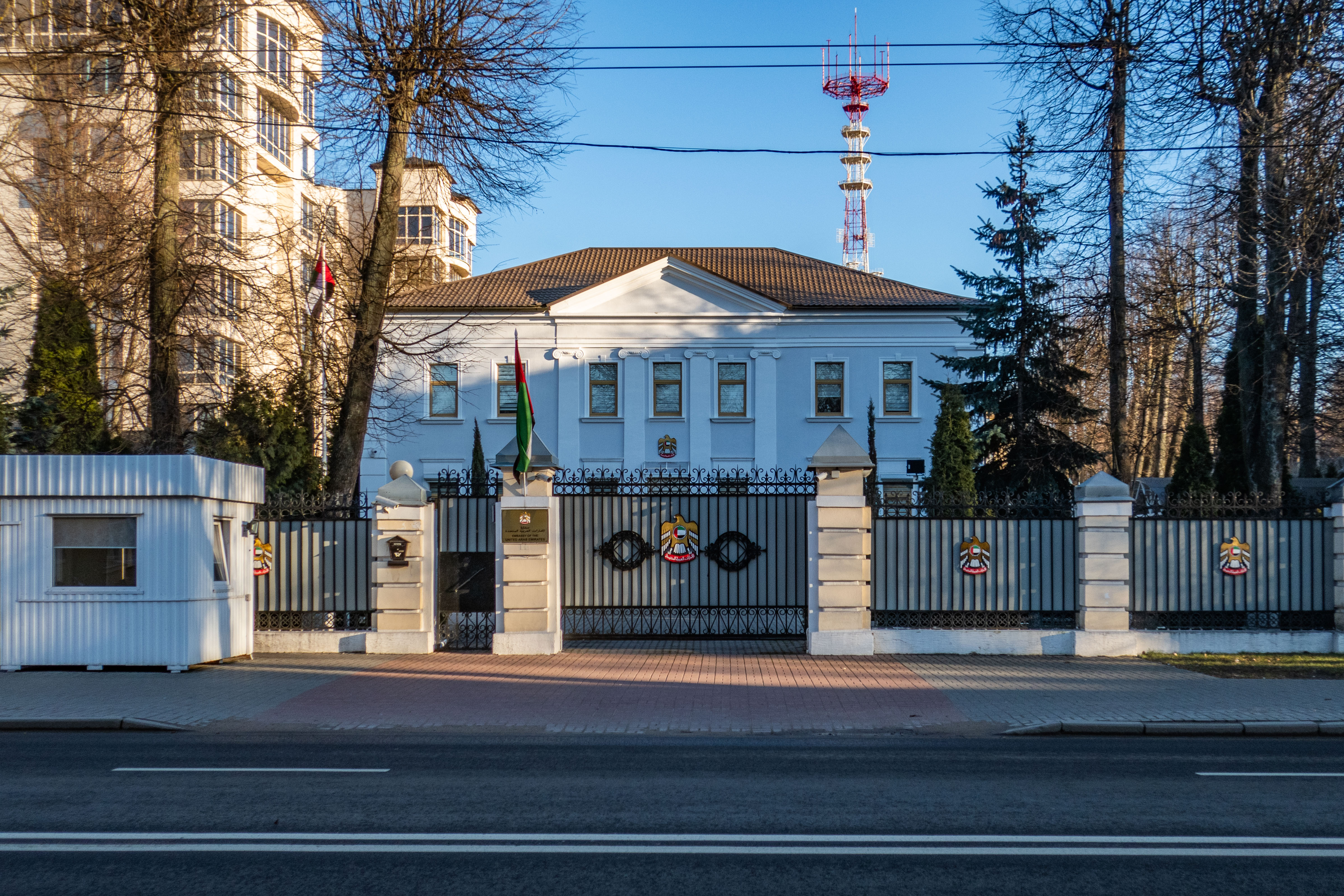
United Arab Emirates

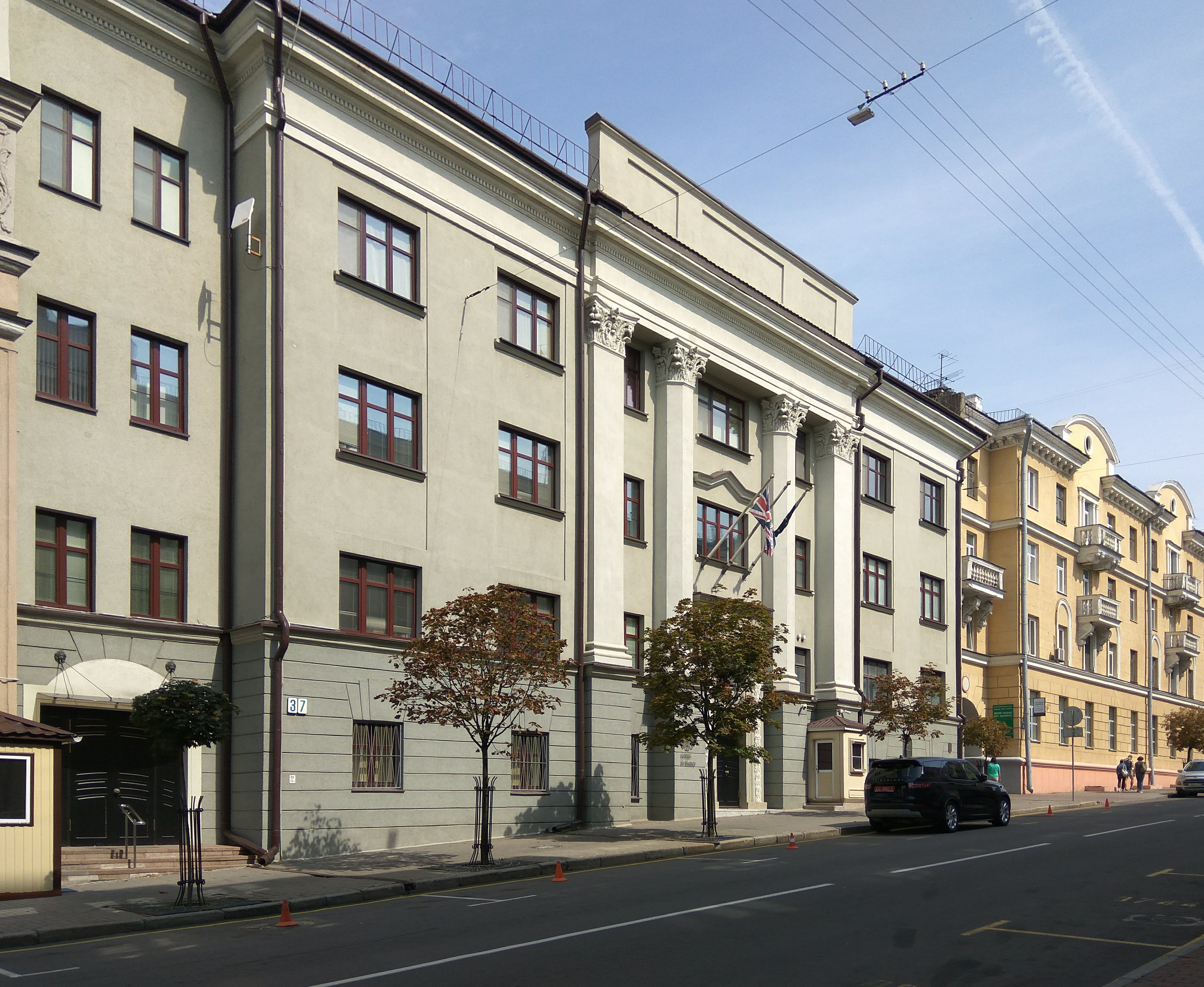
United Kingdom

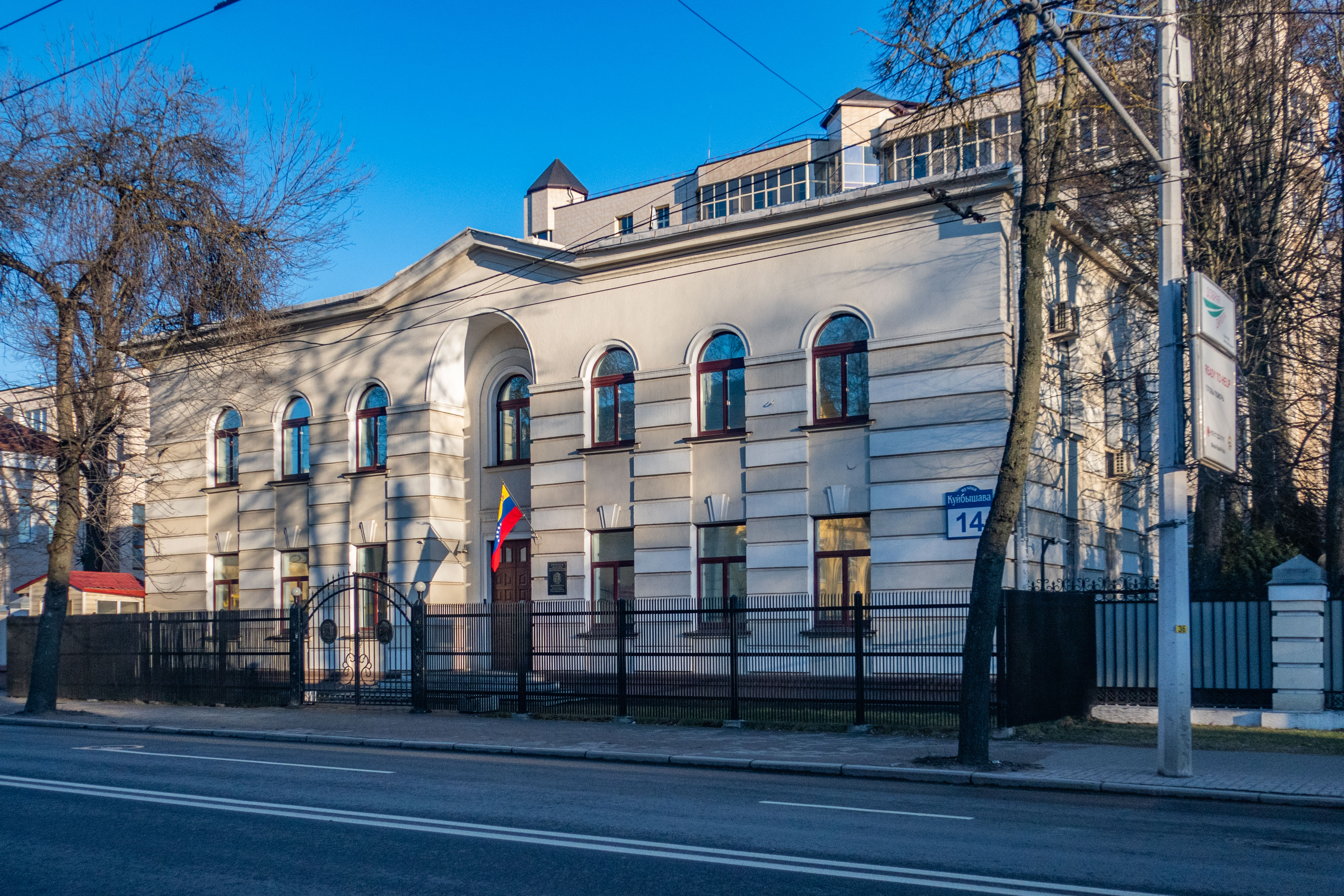
Venezuela

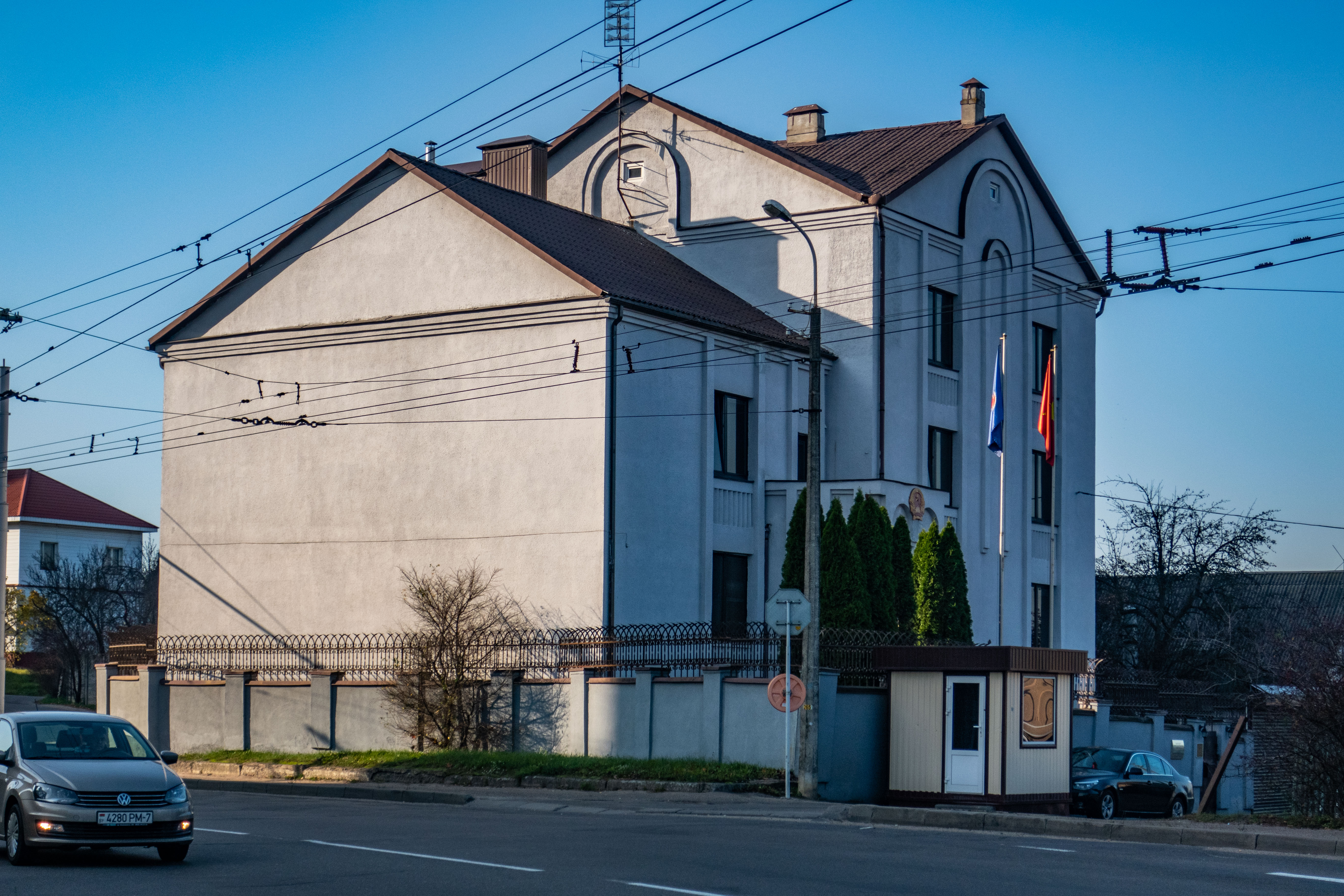
Vietnam

== Consular Missions ==
=== Brest ===
1. Kazakhstan (Consulate-General)
2. Poland (Consulate-General)
3. Russia (Consulate-General)

=== Grodno ===
1. Lithuania (Consulate-General)
2. Poland (Consulate-General)
3. Russia (Consulate-General)

=== Vitebsk ===
1. Latvia (Consulate)

== Embassies to open ==
- Indonesia

== Accredited embassies ==
Resident in Moscow unless otherwise noted

- Afghanistan
- Albania
- Algeria
- Angola
- Argentina
- Australia
- Bangladesh
- Belgium
- Benin
- Bosnia and Herzegovina
- Brunei
- Cambodia
- Canada (Warsaw)
- Chile
- Colombia
- Croatia
- Cyprus
- Denmark
- Egypt
- Finland (Vilnius)
- Greece
- Indonesia
- Ireland (Vilnius)
- Kuwait
- Lebanon
- Malaysia
- Malta (Warsaw)
- Mexico
- Montenegro
- Nepal
- New Zealand
- Nicaragua
- North Macedonia
- Netherlands (Warsaw)
- Norway (Kyiv)
- Panama
- Paraguay
- Peru
- Philippines
- Portugal
- Saudi Arabia
- Senegal
- Slovenia
- South Africa
- Spain
- Sri Lanka
- Thailand
- Togo (Berlin)
- Tanzania
- Uruguay

== Former embassies ==
- Ecuador
- Iraq
- United States

== Former missions ==
- Ukraine (Consultate-General in Brest, closed in March 2022)

== See also ==
- List of diplomatic missions of Belarus
- Visa requirements for Belarusian citizens
