= List of diplomatic missions in Cyprus =

This is a list of diplomatic missions in Cyprus.

There are currently 47 embassies and high commissions in Nicosia. Several other countries have non-resident embassies.

Excluded from this listing are honorary consulates and trade missions. Also excluded are embassies and other representative offices that serve as de facto embassies to the unrecognized state of Northern Cyprus.

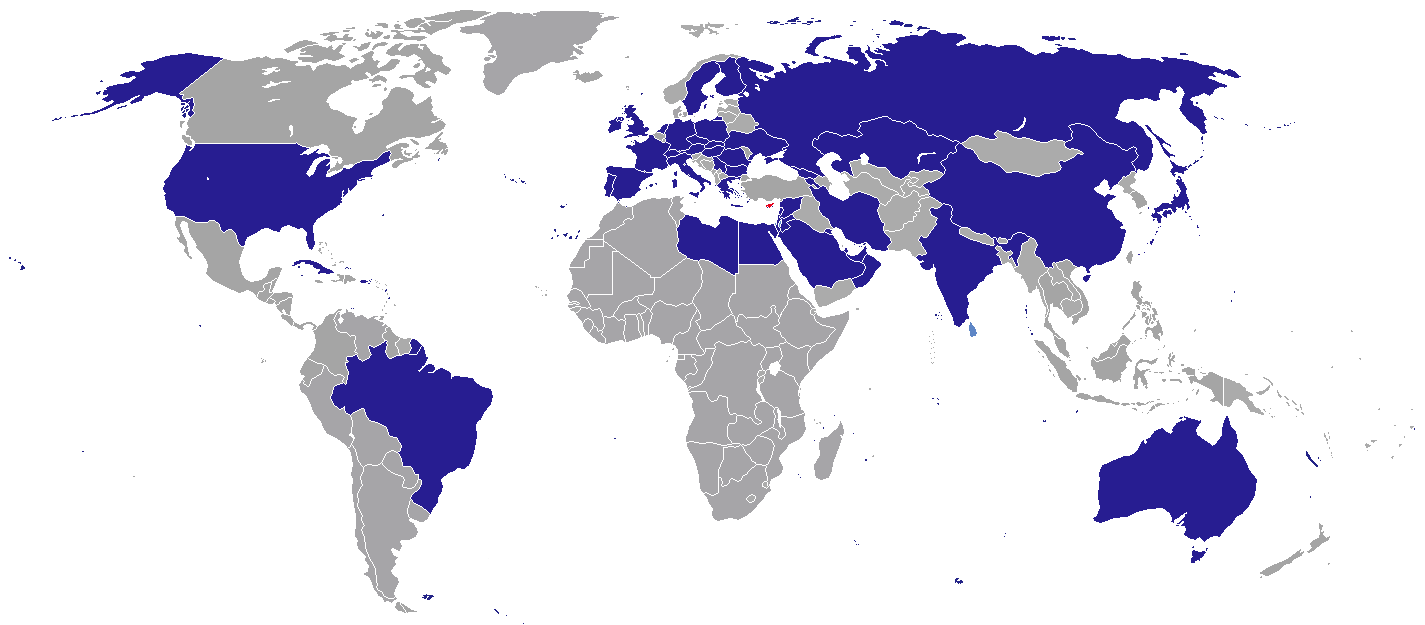
Map of diplomatic missions in Cyprus

== Embassies/high commissions in Nicosia ==
Entries marked with an asterisk (*) are member-states of the Commonwealth of Nations. As such, their embassies are formally termed as "high commissions".

1. Armenia
2. Australia*
3. Austria
4. Brazil
5. Bulgaria
6. China
7. Cuba
8. Czech Republic
9. Egypt
10. Finland
11. France
12. Georgia
13. Germany
14. Greece
15. Holy See
16. Hungary
17. India*
18. Iran
19. Ireland
20. Israel
21. Italy
22. Japan
23. Jordan
24. Kazakhstan
25. Kuwait
26. Lebanon
27. Libya
28. Netherlands
29. Oman
30. Palestine
31. Poland
32. Portugal
33. Qatar
34. Romania
35. Russia
36. Saudi Arabia
37. Serbia
38. Slovakia
39. Sovereign Military Order of Malta
40. Spain
41. Sweden
42. Switzerland
43. Syria
44. Ukraine
45. United Arab Emirates
46. United Kingdom*
47. United States

== Consulate-General in Nicosia ==
1. Sri Lanka

== Non-resident embassies and high commissions accredited to Cyprus ==
=== Resident in Athens, Greece ===
1. Albania
2. Belgium
3. Canada
4. Chile
5. Congo-Kinshasa
6. Croatia
7. Denmark
8. Estonia
9. Iraq
10. Latvia
11. Lithuania
12. Luxembourg
13. Malta
14. Mexico
15. Moldova
16. Montenegro
17. Morocco
18. North Macedonia
19. Norway
20. Panama
21. Peru
22. Philippines
23. Slovenia
24. South Africa
25. South Korea
26. Venezuela

=== Resident in Beirut, Lebanon ===
1. Algeria
2. Bangladesh
3. Malaysia
4. Pakistan
5. Uruguay
6. Yemen

=== Resident in London, United Kingdom ===
1. Barbados
2. Belize
3. Botswana
4. Dominica
5. Eswatini
6. Guyana
7. Jamaica
8. Lesotho
9. Papua New Guinea
10. Seychelles
11. Sierra Leone

=== Resident in Paris, France ===
1. Liberia
2. Togo

=== Resident in Rome, Italy ===
1. Afghanistan
2. Angola
3. Bolivia
4. Burkina Faso
5. Burundi
6. Colombia
7. Costa Rica
8. El Salvador
9. Ethiopia
10. Gabon
11. Indonesia
12. Ivory Coast
13. Kenya
14. Mauritania
15. New Zealand
16. Senegal
17. Sri Lanka
18. Thailand
19. Tunisia
20. Turkmenistan
21. Uganda
22. Uzbekistan
23. Vietnam
24. Zambia
25. Zimbabwe

=== Resident in Sofia, Bulgaria ===
1. Belarus
2. Cambodia
3. Mongolia

=== Resident in Israel ===
==== Jerusalem ====
1. Guatemala
2. Honduras
3. Paraguay

==== Tel Aviv ====
1. Argentina
2. Bahrain
3. Bosnia and Herzegovina
4. Dominican Republic
5. Ecuador
6. Equatorial Guinea
7. Ghana
8. Myanmar
9. Nepal
10. Nigeria
11. Rwanda
12. Tanzania

=== Resident elsewhere ===
1. Andorra (Andorra la Vella)
2. Chad (Cairo)
3. Gambia (Rabat)
4. Guinea (Cairo)
5. Guinea-Bissau (Lisbon)
6. Iceland (Stockholm)
7. Laos (Geneva)
8. Malawi (Geneva)
9. Mali (Cairo)
10. Namibia (Vienna)
11. Nicaragua (Vienna)
12. San Marino (City of San Marino)
13. Singapore (Singapore)

== See also ==
- Foreign relations of Cyprus
- List of diplomatic missions of Cyprus
- List of diplomatic missions in Northern Cyprus
